= Chanchullo (album) =

Studio album by Rubén González
- Released: September 19, 2000
- Recorded: 1997 – 2000
- Studio: EGREM, Havana, Cuba; Angel Recording Studios, London, UK
- Genre: Danzón, cha-cha-chá, descarga, bolero, son cubano, guajira
- Length: 51:04
- Label: World Circuit / Nonesuch
- Producer: Nick Gold

Rubén González chronology
Introducing...Rubén González (1997)	Chanchullo (2000)

Chanchullo (Spanish pronunciation: [tʃanˈtʃuʎo]; literally: "scam", "racket", "hustle") is a studio album by Cuban pianist Rubén González. It was recorded over the course of three years under the direction of trombonist Jesús "Aguaje" Ramos, and released on September 19, 2000, through World Circuit.

The album was nominated for the Best Traditional Tropical Latin Album at the 44th Annual Grammy Awards on February 27, 2002. It also received a nomination for Tropical/Salsa Album of the Year by a Male Artist at the 2001 Billboard Latin Music Awards.

== Recording ==
The album showcases the styles of Cuban ballroom music that González cultivated for three decades as a member of Enrique Jorrín's orchestra, primarily danzón and cha-cha-chá. The opener and title track, "Chanchullo", is a danzón-mambo written by Israel "Cachao" López in the 1950s. González's recording is in the form of a descarga, an improvised jam session. Other descargas in the album are "La lluvia", recorded by the band when the studio roof was leaking and a downpour of tropical rain meant that there were only minutes remaining before the studio had to be abandoned, and "Pa' gozar", composed by Tata Güines and first recorded by Pedro "Peruchín" Jústiz. The other ballroom numbers in the album are the danzones "Central Constancia" and "Isora Club", and the classic cha-cha-chás "El bodeguero" and "Rico vacilón", all of which are standards of the Afro-Cuban repertoire. The recording of "Central Constancia", a composition by Enrique Jorrín, features one of the last appearances of violinist Lázaro Ordóñez Enríquez. On the other hand, "Isora Club", written by Coralia López (Cachao's sister), features solos from Jesús "Aguaje" Ramos (trombone), Manuel "Guajiro" Mirabal (trumpet) and Orlando "Cachaito" López (bass). American guitarist Ry Cooder, along with his son Joachim Cooder, are featured on tres and drums, respectively, on "Rico vacilón".

The album also includes two slow instrumental tracks, the boleros "Si te contara" and "Quizás, quizás, quizás", the latter of which features a solo by Eliades Ochoa. In addition, on the guajira-son "Choco's guajira" (written by trumpeter Alfredo "Chocolate" Armenteros) Papi Oviedo leads on tres, trumpet accompaniment is provided by Manuel "Guajiro" Mirabal, and Ibrahim Ferrer is joined by Cheikh Lô on vocals. The son "De una manera espantosa" was one of the first songs González played with Arsenio Rodríguez's conjunto in the early-to-mid 1940s. González was hired as the band's pianist shortly after arriving in Havana and thereafter referred to Rodríguez as his single most important musical influence. His cover of Rodríguez's son has been described as "much more faithful to the original" when compared to the popular 1970s salsa renditions of Arsenio's songs.

== Critical reception ==
Professional ratings
Review scores
Source	Rating
AllMusic	4/5 stars

Reviewing the album for Billboard, Michael Paoletta wrote: "Cuban pianist Rubén González is one of the most fluent and musically gifted players ever to take a seat at the 88s. Listen to González (…) and reflect on the hands and heart of this 80-year-old maestro. (…) He hadn't been active for over a decade when Juan de Marcos González came calling in '96 with his Afro-Cuban All Stars project, A Toda Cuba le Gusta. A rejuvenated Rubén has since released several albums. Chanchullo is a rewarding mix of Cuban styles, from son montuno to danzón, cha-cha-cha and descarga."

AllMusic reviewer Stacia Proefrock commented: "González is an extremely fluid player and his sometimes complex improvisations seem to constantly come off without a hitch, which is amazing considering that he is in his eighties. The songs range from sweet and light to more passionate and forceful, but throughout, González's unique sense of joy shines through. This album also features a brief appearance from vocalist Ibrahim Ferrer, who gained fame with González through his work with the Buena Vista Social Club. That project has spawned a number of albums which, surprisingly, have nearly all been quality productions. This recording is certainly not the exception to the rule."

In his review for fRoots magazine, Michael Stone stated: "With his second World Circuit release, septuagenarian pianist Rubén González further reveals a virtuoso blend of traditional Cuban danzón, bolero, cha-cha-cha and son with classical influences. (…) The saga of González's renaissance with the Afro-Cuban All Stars and Buena Vista Social Club projects is already the stuff of legend, and Chanchullo's vitality confirms his resonance with the steadfast spirit of Cuban popular music. (…) Would that González had developed his ideas more thoroughly, if only for their exquisiteness (…) But one hesitates to ask more of an album whose stately conception, relaxed take on tradition and effortless virtuosity confirm an enduring talent. Cuban vintage comes no better than this."

In 2009, it was awarded a gold certification from the Independent Music Companies Association which indicated sales of at least 100,000 copies throughout Europe.

== Track listing ==
The following track listing is documented in the sleeve notes:

1. "Chanchullo" (Israel "Cachao" López) – 5:08
2. "De una manera espantosa" (Arsenio Rodríguez) – 4:19
3. "La lluvia" (Miguel "Angá" Díaz, Rubén González, Jesús "Aguaje" Ramos, Orlando "Cachaíto" López, Amadito Valdés) – 5:14
4. "Central Constancia" (Enrique Jorrín) – 5:55
5. "Quizás, quizás, quizás" (Osvaldo Farrés) – 2:25
6. "Choco's Guajira" (Alfredo "Chocolate" Armenteros) – 6:46
7. "Si te contara" (Félix Reina) – 1:27
8. "El bodeguero" (Richard Egües) – 5:09
9. "Isora Club" (Coralia López) – 5:32
10. "Rico vacilón" (Rosendo Ruiz Jr.) – 4:09
11. "Pa' gozar" (Arístides Soto) – 4:30

== Personnel ==
The following personnel is documented in the sleeve notes:

=== Musicians ===
- Rubén González – piano
- Orlando "Cachaíto" López – bass
- Amadito Valdés – timbales
- Miguel "Angá" Díaz – congas
- Ángel Terry Domech – congas
- Roberto García – bongos, cowbell, güiro
- Alberto "Virgilio" Valdés – maracas
- Alejandro Pichardo Pérez – güiro, claves
- Manuel "Guajiro" Mirabal – trumpet
- Jesús "Aguaje" Ramos – trombone
- Richard Egües – flute
- Joaquin Oliveiras – flute
- Javier Zalba – baritone saxophone
- Lázaro Ordóñez Enríquez – violin
- Eliades Ochoa – guitar
- Papi Oviedo – tres
- Ry Cooder – tres
- Joachim Cooder – drums

=== Singers ===
- Ibrahim Ferrer – vocals (2, 6 & chorus)
- Cheikh Lô – vocals (6)
- Jesús "Aguaje" Ramos – chorus
- Lázaro Villa – chorus

=== Production ===
- Jesús "Aguaje" Ramos – musical director
- Nick Gold – producer
- Jerry Boys – engineer, mixing, mastering
- Tom Leader – mastering
- Simon Burwell – assistant recording & mixing engineer
- Julío Martínez Rodríguez – assistant recording engineer
- Cristina Piza – cover photography
- Christina Jaspars – other photography
- Susan Titelman – other photography
- David Burton – centre page photography
- Rubén González – archive photography
- Kathryn Samson – cover design
- Sigfredo Ariel – research
