= Social Club Buenavista (composition) =

"Social Club Buenavista" (also known as "Buena Vista Social Club") is a danzón composed by Cuban bassist Israel López "Cachao". It is one of his many compositions dedicated to a Cuban venue where he frequently played as part of the charanga Arcaño y sus Maravillas. It has become a standard of the genre, being regularly performed by artists such as Frank Emilio Flynn and Rubén González throughout the 20th century. Although composed during the 1940s, it was first recorded in 1958 by Cachao himself, along with several former members of las Maravillas, for the album El Gran Cachao, released by Kubaney.

== Origin and composition ==
Between 1938 and 1948, Cachao and his brother Orestes (nicknamed "Macho") were the songwriting and arranging core of Las Maravillas de Arcaño, later known as Arcaño y sus Maravillas, one of Cuba's most popular charangas, directed by flautist Antonio Arcaño. Every night, las Maravillas would play in a different venue, including casinos, hotels, youth associations, blacks associations, etc. Their long sets required them to have a vast repertoire, so Cachao and Orestes would compose new danzones regularly, totalling thousands over the years. Many of these were dedicated to the venues they performed in, such as "Club Social de Marianao", "Redención Sport Club" (in Pogolotti, Havana), "Avance Juvenil" (in Ciego de Ávila), "Centro San Agustín" (in Alquízar), and "Social Club Buenavista". The latter was an association of Afro-Cubans in the Buenavista neighbourhood of Havana, founded in 1932.

The song was copyrighted in the United States on 23 March 1964, shortly after Cachao arrived in the country from Madrid, where he had originally gone into exile.

== World Circuit recordings ==
In March 1996, a recording session took place in Havana featuring musicians from the so-called "Golden Age of Cuban music" (1940s and 1950s), organized by the record label World Circuit. During the sessions, guitarist and producer Ry Cooder asked Rubén González to play his favorite tunes on piano. Of all the tunes, Ry selected "Social Club Buenavista" as his favorite and used its title as the name for the album and the ensemble itself: Buenavista Social Club. The bassist in the group was Orlando "Cachaíto" López, Cachao's nephew.

In the album's liner notes, however, the composition is misattributed to Cachao's brother and Cachaíto's father, Orestes López.

== See also ==
- Pueblo Nuevo (danzón)
- Redención (danzón)
