= Mambo (1938 song) =

"Mambo" is a 1938 danzón nuevo ritmo by Arcaño y sus Maravillas. It was composed by the band's cellist/multi-instrumentalist Orestes López. The piece includes a final section with syncopated montunos which would give rise to the mambo music genre popularized by Dámaso Pérez Prado and others.

== Personnel ==
- Antonio Arcaño (replaced by Eulogio Ortiz on 1951 recording) – flute
- Jesús López – piano
- Israel "Cachao" López – double bass
- Orestes López – cello
- Miguel Valdés – viola
- Enrique Jorrín – violin
- Elio Valdés – violin
- Fausto Muñoz – violin
- Félix Reina - violin
- Antonio Sánchez "Musiquita" – violin
- Ulpiano Díaz – timbales
- Eliseo Martínez – tumbadora
- Gustavo Tamayo – güiro
