= Félix Reina =

Cuban violinist, arranger, music director and composer (1921–1998)

- Born: Félix Rafael Herrera Altuna; May 21, 1921; Trinidad, Cuba
- Died: February 10, 1998 (aged 76) Havana, Cuba
- Genres: Danzón, mambo, chachachá, bolero
- Occupations: Musician, bandleader, composer
- Instrument: Violin
- Years active: 1940s-1998
- Labels: Victor, Panart, EGREM

Félix Rafael Herrera Altuna (May 21, 1921 – February 10, 1998), better known as Félix Reina, was a Cuban violinist, arranger, music director and composer. Since the mid-1940s, he was a member of many popular charangas, including Arcaño y sus Maravillas, Orquesta América and Fajardo y sus Estrellas. In 1959, after Fajardo went into exile, he became the leader of his orchestra, the Estrellas Cubanas, which he directed until his death. A prolific composer, his most performed danzones include "Angoa", "Los jóvenes del silencio" and "El niche". In the 1950s, he primarily wrote chachachás and his bolero "Si te contara" became a standard of the genre.

== Life and career ==
Born in Trinidad, Sancti Spíritus, Cuba, Félix Reina began his musical studies with his father and with violin teacher Isidro Cintra. After playing in local orchestras for some time, he moved to Havana in 1946, joining the charanga directed by flutist José Antonio Díaz. Soon, he joined Arcaño y sus Maravillas, which was very popular at the time. Directed by flutist Antonio Arcaño, cousin of Díaz, the orchestra featured musicians such as Israel López "Cachao", Orestes López and Ulpiano Díaz, which were responsible for the development of the danzón-mambo in the late 1930s. At the time of Reina's arrival, the Maravillas were a mainstay of Havana's Radio Mil Diez, earning the nickname "La Radiofónica". Reina soon contributed several danzones to the group's repertoire including "Angoa", "Los jóvenes del silencio" and "El niche". The latter was covered by Machito and many other bands thereafter.

In 1950, Reina became a member of the newly formed Fajardo y sus Estrellas, he then directed his own orchestra for a short period of time before joining Orquesta América in 1954 at the height of the chachachá craze. The América, directed by Ninón Mondéjar, was the group that pioneered the genre thanks to its first violin Enrique Jorrín. After touring México with the América, Jorrín decided to stay in the country for some time with his own group, and Reina stayed with him. In 1958, back in Cuba, Reina re-joined José Fajardo y sus Estrellas. Both Jorrín and Fajardo were former members of the Maravillas, like Reina. In June 1959, after touring Japan, Fajardo decided to stay in the United States on their way back to Cuba. Reina and most of the musicians returned to Havana and began working without Fajardo. With Reina as the new leader, the band was renamed Orquesta Estrellas Cubanas and would remain active for the rest of the 20th century. In the 1960s, his bolero "Si te contara" was covered by singers in both Cuba and the United States, thus entering the Latin music repertoire, where it remains a popular song. Among its notable performers are Antonio Machín, Elena Burke, Panchito Riset, Omara Portuondo, Rubén González and Diego el Cigala. In 1962, "Vuela la paloma", composed by Reina, became a hit for Tito Rodríguez, and was later covered by Johnny Pacheco and others.

Reina died on February 10, 1998, in Havana's Calixto García Hospital, having suffered a stroke in the Habana Cafe, known as Benny's corner, located in the Melia Cohiba Hotel in Vedado. The Estrellas Cubanas continued performing, now under the direction of violinist Gilberto Valdés.
