= Chanchullo =

Single by Orquesta de Arcaño y sus Maravillas
- A-side: "El que sabe, sabe"
- Released: 1957
- Recorded: 1957
- Genre: Danzón-mambo
- Label: Gema
- Songwriter: Israel "Cachao" López

"Chanchullo" (Spanish pronunciation: [tʃanˈtʃuʝo]; literally: "scam", "racket", "hustle") is a danzón-mambo composed by Cuban bassist Israel "Cachao" López. It was first released as a single in 1957 by Arcaño y sus Maravillas. It was the third single released on Cuban independent record label Gema and has been covered by multiple artists including Tito Puente, Típica '73 and Rubén González. Puente himself reworked the song as the successful "Oye cómo va", later recorded by Santana, for which Cachao received no credit. Instrumental versions of the song have been recorded variously under the titles "Mambolandia" and "Mambología", often credited to Peruchín.

== Composition and recordings ==
The first recording of "Chanchullo" was made in 1949 for RCA Victor by Julio Gutiérrez's orchestra under the title "Mambolandia" and credited to Peruchín, who plays piano on the track. An edited version of "Mambolandia" was included in the 1950 Cuban-Argentine film Off to Havana I Go, specifically for a dancing scene starring María Maceda and Rolando García at the Cabaret Montmartre in Havana. This performance was later included in a documentary film on the origin of the mambo produced by Cubavisión. It has been named as one of the most important films involved in spreading mambo.

The first version of "Chanchullo" credited to Cachao was recorded in 1957 by Arcaño y sus Maravillas, one year before their dissolution. For the recording, the group featured composer, bassist and musical director Israel López "Cachao", who had left the group in 1949. Bandleader Antonio Arcaño was no longer performing on flute for health reasons, so Eulogio Ortiz played the flute parts. Like many other 1950s recordings by the Maravillas, this piece likely originated from an earlier composition from the period when Cachao and his brother Orestes composed most of the bands danzones (1937–1950). Most authors agree that "Rareza de Melitón"—first played by the Maravillas in 1942—is the precursor to "Chanchullo". According to Max Salazar, "Rareza de Melitón" could have been composed as early as 1937, which would make it one of the first examples of danzón-mambo, predating "Mambo" by one year. Most sources assign the authorship of "Rareza de Melitón" to Cachao, while Helio Orovio credits his brother.

In 1958, Colombian musician Luis Andrés and his orchestra recorded "Chanchullo" under the title "Mambología" for the album Fiesta en París, released by Vergara. In 1960, Rolando Aguiló also recorded "Chanchullo" under the title "Mambología" for his first Cuban Jam Session album issued by Maype. These versions are almost identical to the recording of "Mambolandia" by Julio Gutiérrez. The Panamaian band Máximo Rodríguez y sus Estrellas Panameñas recorded "Chanchullo" under the title "Mambología" for their album Felicidad y bogaloo. Colombian band Séptimo Sentido recorded "Mambología" in 2003 and credited it to Máximo Rodríguez.

Tito Puente recorded "Chanchullo" in 1959, and in 1963 he built on the tune's introduction to compose "Oye cómo va". As shown in the documentary Cachao: Uno más, when asked whether he would sue for his rightful share of the royalties, the notoriously humble Cachao shrugged and said: "You know how kids are". On August 4, 1990, Cachao joined Tito Puente on stage for a performance of "Oye cómo va" as part of the Atlanta Jazz Festival. Before the performance, Puente introduced Cachao by saying: "This gentleman is responsible for all the music we play".

== Track listing ==
No.	Title	Writer(s)	Length
1.	"El que sabe, sabe"	Ernesto Duarte
2.	"Chanchullo"	Israel "Cachao" López

== Personnel ==
- Antonio Arcaño – leader
- Israel "Cachao" López – musical director, bass
- Eulogio Ortiz – flute, soloist
- Orestes López – piano
- Ernesto Duarte – producer

== Cover versions ==
- Tito Puente, on the album Mucho Cha-Cha (1959)
- Gilberto Cruz, on the album Chanchullo (1971)
- Típica '73, on the album Charangueando con la Típica 73 (1980)
- Fania All-Stars, on the album Greatest Hits (1992)
- Olavo Alén Rodríguez Son Ensemble Nos Naranjos, on the album From Afrocuban Music to Salsa (1999)
- Rubén González, on the album Chanchullo (2000)
- Joaquín J. Oliveros, on the album De Bala (2000)
- Somos Amigos, on the album Imagínate Cuba (2005)
- Charanga Tropical on the album Live! (2006)
- Buena Vista Social Club, on the album At Carnegie Hall (2008)
- Cuba Jazz Millennium All Stars, on the album Tributo a Arsenio, Chano Pozo y los Clásicos (2008)
- Al De Lory, on the album Hot Gandinga (2009)
