= Ulpiano Díaz =

Cuban percussionist (1900–1990)

- Born: 1900; Pinar del Río, Cuba
- Died: 1990; Havana, Cuba
- Genres: Danzón, mambo
- Occupation: Musician
- Instrument(s): Timbales, güiro
- Labels: Columbia, Panart
- Formerly of: Orquesta de Félix González, Orquesta de Tata Alfonso, Arcaño y sus Maravillas, Fajardo y sus Estrellas

Ulpiano Díaz (1900–1990) was a Cuban timbalero. He is considered an innovator of the timbales, being the first to add a small cowbell to the setup, and popularizing the abanico. He started his career playing güiro in Félix González's orquesta típica, and rose to prominence as the timbales player of three important charangas: Orquesta de Tata Alfonso, Arcaño y sus Maravillas and Fajardo y sus Estrellas.

== Career ==
Díaz was born in Pinar del Río in the year 1900. He learned to play several percussion instruments by himself before joining the Septeto Cuba, based in Havana. He later became the güirist in Orquesta de Félix González. He then joined Tata Alfonso's charanga as the timbalero. He would become a master of the instrument, joining Fernando Collazo's La Maravilla del Siglo in 1936. Along with Antonio Arcaño and other members of this band, Díaz founded La Maravilla de Arcaño in 1937. La Maravilla de Arcaño, later renamed Arcaño y sus Maravillas, would become Cuba's most prolific charanga. Díaz later joined José Fajardo's charanga during the 1950s, and after Fajardo's exile, continued to play in the group, which was renamed Orquesta Estrellas Cubanas and directed by violinist Félix Reina.

Díaz died in 1990 in Havana.

== Innovations ==
Díaz is generally credited with the addition of the cowbell to the modern timbales setup, an innovation that expanded the sound of the instrument. Famous timbaleros such as Amadito Valdés credit him with this invention, although others have cited Antonio Orta Ferrol "Mañengue" with introducing the cowbell in 1912. According to Changuito, it was Guillermo García.
