= Redención (danzón) =

"Redención Sport Club", or simply "Redención", is a danzón composed by Cuban multi-instrumentalist Orestes López in the 1940s. It is one of his many compositions dedicated to a Cuban venue where he frequently played as part of the charanga Arcaño y sus Maravillas, alongside his brother Israel López "Cachao". The latter recorded the song multiple times during his career and included it in his albums Jam Session with Feeling (1958) and Cuba linda (2000). These and other recordings and performances have made of the tune a standard of danzón repertoire. An experimental version of the song was used as the opener on the only album by Orlando "Cachaíto" López, Orestes's son.

The composition is named after the Redención Sport Club, a venue and association in the Pogolotti neighbourhood of Havana (named after Dino Pogolotti, the area was originally meant to be called Redención).

== See also ==
- Pueblo Nuevo (danzón)
- Social Club Buenavista (composition)
