= Coralia López =

- Birth name: Juana Coralia López Valdés
- Born: May 6, 1910; Old Havana, Havana, Cuba
- Died: 1993 (aged 82–83); Havana, Cuba
- Genres: Danzón
- Occupation(s): Musician, bandleader, composer
- Instrument: Piano
- Formerly of: Cachao, Orestes López

Juana Coralia López Valdés (May 6, 1910 – 1993) was a Cuban pianist, bandleader and composer. Between 1940 and 1956 she directed her own charanga danzonera, being the first woman to direct any such orchestra in Cuba. During her career she composed many popular danzones such as "Llegó Manolo", "El bajo que come chivo", "Los jóvenes del agua fria" and the famous "Isora Club", which became a standard in the Latin music repertoire.

== Life and career ==
Juana Coralia López Valdés was born in Havana, Cuba, on May 6, 1910, into a family of musicians. Her father, Pedro López, taught her music since she was child. Soon she was employed as a musician, choosing the piano as her preferred instrument. Her older brother, Orestes, nicknamed "Macho", was a multi-instrumentalist playing the bass, cello and piano, while her younger brother Israel, nicknamed "Cachao", specialized in the bass. Both Orestes and Israel joined Antonio Arcaño y sus Maravillas in the 1930s. Coralia, started her own orchestra in 1940, and the following year she debuted her composition "Isora Club", dedicated to one of the many clubs where she played with her band. It won the 1941 danzón contest organized by Radio Mil Diez. In 1943, the song was recorded by Arcaño, and many other covers would follow over the years, including Cachao's (1958, 1993), Orquesta Aragón's (1960) and Rubén González's (2000).

Coralia's charanga featured flutist Edelmiro Pérez, güirist Alfredo Lazo, timbalero Armando Lazo, singer Rubén Cortada, bassist Pepito Seoani, and a violin section with Raúl Valdés, Jesús Lanza, Tomás Reisoto and Enrique Jorrín, who would later join the Maravillas, Orquesta América and in 1951 create the chachachá. Coralia's nephew, bassist Orlando "Cachaíto" López (son of Orestes), began his career in her band. Despite their many live performances and original compositions, the group never made a recording before their dissolution in 1956.

Coralia López died in 1993, two years after the passing of her brother Orestes.
