= Arcaño y sus Maravillas =

Cuban charanga

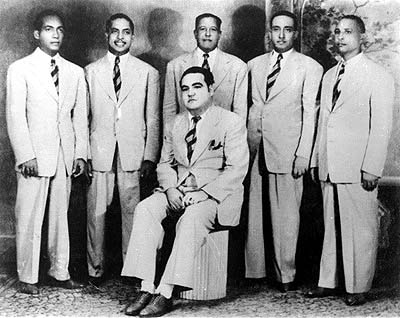
- The original members of Arcaño y sus Maravillas. Antonio Arcaño, sitting; Cachao, second from the left.

Background information
- Origin: Havana, Cuba
- Genres: Danzón; danzón-mambo
- Years active: 1937–1958
- Labels: RCA Victor, Panart, Corona, Verne, Kubaney, Maype, Modiner, EGREM
- Past members: Antonio Arcaño; Orestes López; Israel López "Cachao"; Ulpiano Díaz; Jesús López; Raúl Valdés; Elizardo Aroche; Félix Reina; Antonio Sánchez "Musiquita"; Elio Valdés; Miguel Tachit; José Antonio Díaz; Eulogio Ortiz; Enrique Jorrín; Frank Emilio Flynn; Rafael Ortiz; Miguelito Cuní; René Álvarez

Arcaño y sus Maravillas was a Cuban charanga founded in 1937 by flautist Antonio Arcaño. Until its dissolution in 1958, it was one of the most popular and prolific danzón orchestras in Cuba, particularly due to the development of the danzón-mambo by its two main composers and musicians: Orestes López (piano, cello, bass) and his brother Israel López "Cachao" (bass). Such upbeat version of the danzón served as a precursor of the mambo popularized by Pérez Prado, as well as the chachachá created by Enrique Jorrín, a violinist who started his career in the Maravillas. Other important musicians in the Maravillas were pianist Jesús López (unrelated to Orestes and Israel), timbalero Ulpiano Díaz, violinist Félix Reina and flautist Eulogio Ortiz.

Antonio Arcaño, former member of singer Fernando Collazo's La Maravilla del Siglo, founded his orchestra in November 1937 under the name La Maravilla de Arcaño, featuring many of the members of Collazo's group. Collazo himself complained about the similarity in the name, so by 1939 it was changed to Arcaño y sus Maravillas. By then the band had become popular across the island due to hits such as "Mambo". Around 1944, they began to play at radio shows in Havana and the group doubled its roster. It became known as La Radiofónica and Arcaño as El Monarca del Danzón (The Monarch of Danzón). However, Arcaño had to stop playing in 1945 due to lip problems preventing him from maintaining his embouchure. He continued as director and hired his cousin José Antonio Díaz as flautist, who was later replaced by Eulogio Ortiz. Cachao left the group by the end of the decade (being replaced by his nephew Orlando "Cachaíto" López, Orestes' son), but returned to record "Chanchullo" in 1957, one year before the Maravillas played their last show in Alquízar.

Several reunions of the group occurred in the 1970s and 1980s featuring some of the original members. These were released on two LPs by Areito.

== History ==
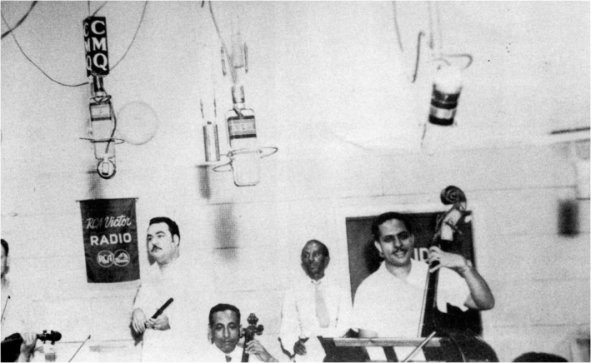
Arcaño y sus Maravillas at Radio CMQ, c. 1945: Arcaño on flute, Orestes López on cello, Cachao on bass.

Born in 1911 in Havana, Antonio Arcaño studied music with Armando Romeu Sr., playing cornet and clarinet and later learned the flute from his cousin José Antonio Díaz. He later joined Armando Valdespí's group and Orquesta Gris. In 1936, he joined La Maravilla del Siglo, directed by singer Fernando Collazo. The members of this band became the core of Arcaño's new band in November 1937: La Maravilla de Arcaño. This charanga was composed of Afro-Cubans, all except for Arcaño himself. He decided not to have a singer (vocalists were popular in danzón since 1929) and decided to play mostly black venues, which paid significantly less than whites-only clubs. Nonetheless, this allowed the group to learn their trade and became particularly prolific: one year they performed a record 404 shows in total. Every night, las Maravillas would play in a different venue, including casinos, hotels, youth associations, blacks associations, etc. Their long sets required them to have a vast repertoire, but thankfully most of its musicians were also composers. The brothers Cachao and Orestes would compose new danzones regularly, totalling thousands over the years. Many of these were dedicated to the venues they performed in, such as "Social Club Buenavista" (in Buenavista, Havana) "Club Social de Marianao" (in Marianao, Havana), "Redención Sport Club" (in Pogolotti, Havana), "Juventud de Pueblo Nuevo" (in Pueblo Nuevo, Havana), "Avance Juvenil" (in Ciego de Ávila), "Centro San Agustín" (in Alquízar) and "Bella Unión" (in Güines).

The band's first big hit came with "Mambo", a danzón de nuevo ritmo, or as it would be called later, danzón-mambo. This style, created by the López brothers, added an improvised section to the end of the danzón structure. This section, the "mambo", proved to be very popular with dancers, as it allowed them a certain freedom not present in the rigid structure of the danzón. New genres would later emerge from this section, such as the fast-paced mambo and the slower chachachá, both of which became dance crazes in the 1950s. They made their first recordings in April 1940, and in 1944 the group expanded its lineup for the radio, where they had their own program on Radio Mil Diez, sponsored by Gravi toothpaste and Dermos soap. This group was known as La Radiofónica. At this point, the group was competing with the most popular ensembles of the island, and together with Orquesta Melodías del 40 and Arsenio Rodríguez's conjunto it formed Los Tres Grandes (The Big Three).

In 1945, circulatory problems related to his lip prevented Arcaño from maintaining his embouchure, which was the end for his playing career. He continued as director and hired his cousin and former teacher José Antonio Díaz as flautist, who was later replaced by Eulogio Ortiz. It was Ortiz who recorded the 1951 version of "Mambo". Cachao left the group by the end of the decade (being replaced by his nephew Orlando "Cachaíto" López, Orestes' son), but returned to record "Chanchullo" in 1957, one year before the Maravillas played their last show in Alquízar. Both Cachao and Orestes were playing in Havana's Philharmonic Orchestra at the same time as they were members of the Maravillas. In fact, many of their compositions were arrangements of classical pieces, and even film scores, such as Cachao's "África viva", which quotes "Somewhere over the Rainbow".

In the mid-1950s, Arcaño signed with Panart, Cuba's first independent record label, and recorded twelve songs, some of which featured the Cuarteto Musicabana (with young vocalist Omara Portuondo) and blind pianist Frank Emilio Flynn (these were his first recordings). Nonetheless, in the 1950s mambo and chachachá contributed to the decline of the danzón, and by 1958, Arcaño decided to put an end to his charanga after two decades of concerts and recordings. The final recording of the original band, and the only one for Gema Records, was "Chanchullo" by Cachao. The tumbao in the song was imitated by Tito Puente for his hit "Oye cómo va".

== Discography ==
Several of the group's RCA Victor singles (1940–1951) have been released on the Danzon Mambo CD.

- 1957: Latin Fiesta (Kubaney)
- 1958: Danzones de ayer, de hoy y siempre (Maype)
- 1959: Pita Arcaño, dale Dermos (Modiner)
- 1976: Arcaño y sus Maravillas (Areito)
- 1980: Arcaño y sus Maravillas (Areito)
- 1995: Danzon Mambo (Tumbao) - compilation of 1944-1951 recordings
- 1996: Orquesta Arcaño y sus Maravillas (Discmedi) – archival radio recordings

== See also ==
- Coralia López
- Orquesta América
