= Pueblo Nuevo (danzón) =

"Juventud del Pueblo Nuevo", or simply "Pueblo Nuevo", is a danzón composed by Cuban bassist Israel López "Cachao". It is one of his many compositions dedicated to a Cuban venue where he frequently played as part of the charanga Arcaño y sus Maravillas. It has become a standard of the genre, being regularly performed by danzón orchestras over the years.

It was first recorded in 1946 by Belisario López's orchestra for RCA Victor. The Maravillas recorded it in their eponymous 1980 reunion album, released by Areito. It was recorded by Frank Emilio Flynn for his 1999 album Ancestral Reflections and by Buena Vista Social Club for their eponymous album (although misattributed to Rubén González in the liner notes).

== See also ==
- Redención (danzón)
- Social Club Buenavista (composition)
