= Redención =

Redención (Spanish for "redemption") may refer to:

== Music ==
- Redención (danzón), composed by Orestes López
- Redención (anthem), composed by Rosendo Ruiz Suárez
- Redención (march), composed by Manuel Gregorio Tavárez

== Film ==
Films known in Spanish as Redención:

- Hummingbird (film), 2013
- Southpaw (film), 2015
- Tyrannosaur (film), 2011

== See also ==
- Redemption (disambiguation)
- Redenzione (disambiguation)
