= Enrique Peña Sánchez =

Cuban musician (1880–1922)

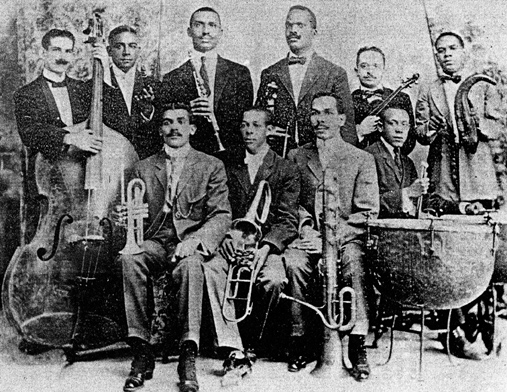
Orquesta Enrique Peña, with Peña seated left

Enrique Peña Sánchez (17 July 1880 – 13 April 1922) was a leading Cuban cornet player, orchestra leader and composer.

== Biography ==
Born in Puerto Padre, a small town in the old province of Oriente, Peña studied with Marcos González and José Santos Betancourt. In 1902 he moved to Havana, and founded the band La Juventud, with himself as director and cornet, Rogelio Solis (double bass), Félix González (ophicleide), José Belén Puig (first clarinet), José Urfé (second clarinet), José de los Reyes (kettle drum) and Rufino Cárdenas (güiro). This band had several members who became well known; Puig went on to become a famous leader of his own charanga. The band functioned until 1906.

His second band was called the Orquesta típica de Enrique Peña. Its line-up was Peña (cornet); Antonio González (trombone); Féliz González (figle); José Belén Puig (1st clarinet); José Urfé (2nd clarinet); Julián Barreto (violin); Alfredo Sáenz (violin); José de los Reyes (tympani); Rufino Cárdenas (güíro) and unknown (double bass). This orchestra became famous for being the first to play El bombín de Barreto (Barreto's bowler hat), written by Urfé, which was supposedly the first danzón to incorporate a syncopated third part, influenced by the son. The group recorded about 150 numbers, some of which are available on CD.

Peña was a prolific composer of danzones, amongst which are El ñáñigo, El dengue, El demonio de la negra, La flor de Cuba, Malabares and Edén concert. He died in Havana.

== See also ==
- Early Cuban bands
