= Timbales =

Shallow single-headed drums with a metal casing

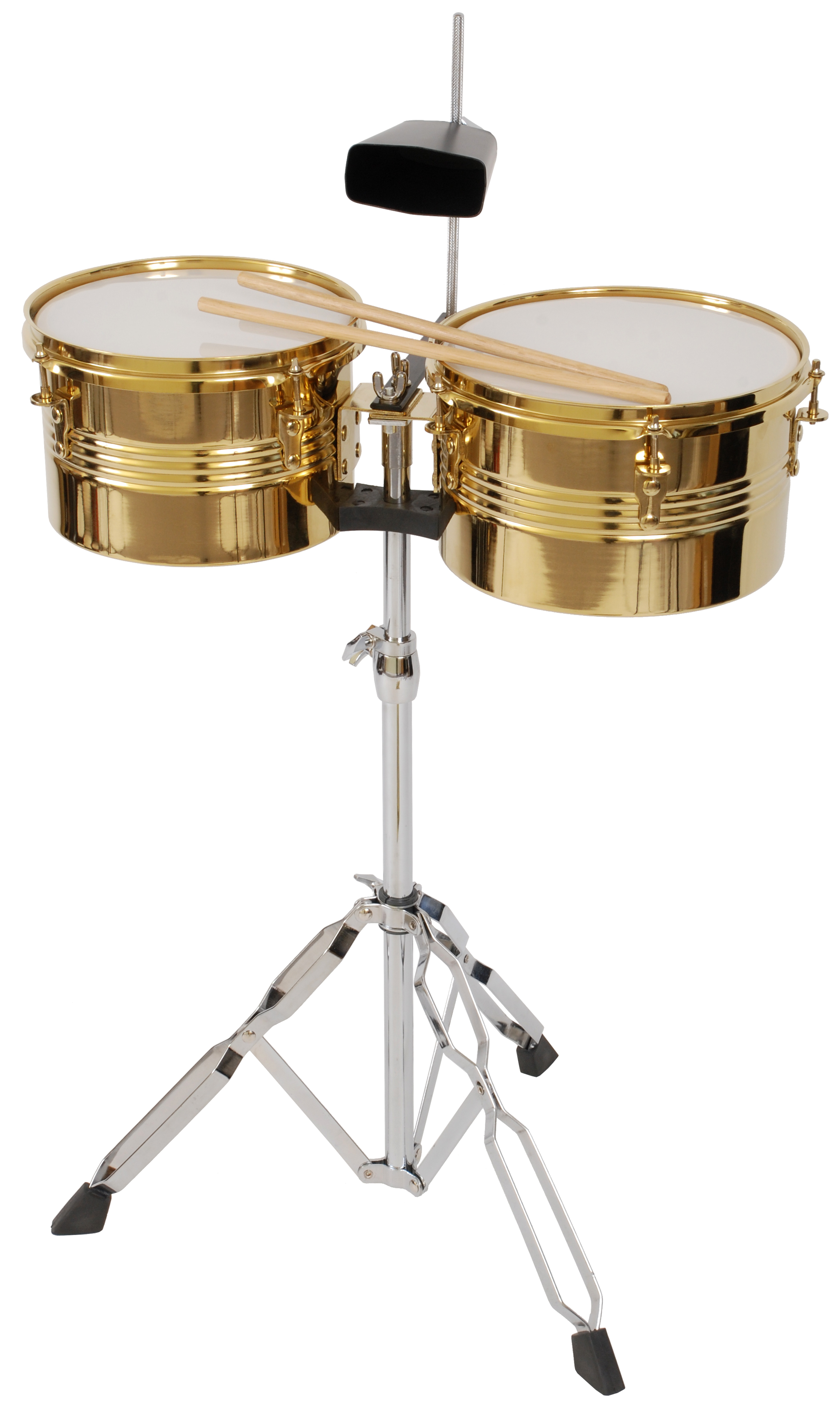
- Timbales with a single cowbell

Percussion instrument
- Other names: Timbaleta, pailas, pailas criollas
- Classification: drum
- Hornbostel–Sachs classification: percussion (membranophone)
- Developed: c. 1900 in Cuba

Related instruments
- Timpani, bongo drum

Sound of timbales

Timbales (/tɪmˈbɑːliːz/) are shallow single-headed drums with metal casing. They are shallower than single-headed tom-toms and usually tuned much higher, especially for their size.

Timbales are struck with wooden sticks on the heads and shells, although bare hands are sometimes used. The player (called a timbalero) uses a variety of stick strokes, rim shots, and rolls to produce a wide range of percussive expression during solos and at transitional sections of music, and usually plays the shells (or auxiliary percussion such as a cowbell or cymbal) to keep time in other parts of the song. The shells and the typical pattern played on them are referred to as cáscara. Common stroke patterns include abanico, baqueteo (from danzón), mambo, and chachachá.

Timbales have average diameters of 33 cm (13 in) (macho drum) and 35 cm (14 in) (hembra drum). Originally made of calfskin, the heads are most commonly made of plastic for increased volume and durability and mounted on a steel rim. The shells, which are open at their bases, are usually made of metal, although wooden shells are also available. In general, the drums are mounted on a stand and played while standing.

== Etymology ==
In Spain and in classical music contexts across the Hispanophone world, the word timbales (sing. timbal) refers to timpani (kettledrums). The Spanish word tímpano is less commonly used. Timbal, tímpano and timpani all derive from the Latin tympănum, from the Greek týmpanon, meaning drum. (The Spanish word for drum, tambor, although similar, actually derives from Arabic tabl).

In Cuba and Latin America, timbales (timpani) were adapted into pailas, which is the name given to various Spanish metallic bowls and pans used as cookware (see paila). Paila derives from Old French paele, from Latin patĕlla. However, the term timbales continued to be used to refer to pailas, which is a less common term restricted to Cuba. Because of the historical overlap in the use of timpani and pailas (both called timbales) by danzón orchestras between 1900 and 1930, usage of the term in that period is ambiguous.

Similar ambiguities exist in other languages. For example, in French, timbales (pronounced [tɛ̃bal]) is also the word for timpani, thus the French refer to Cuban timbales as timbales latines. In Brazil, the term timbal refers to an unrelated drum, timbau.

== History ==
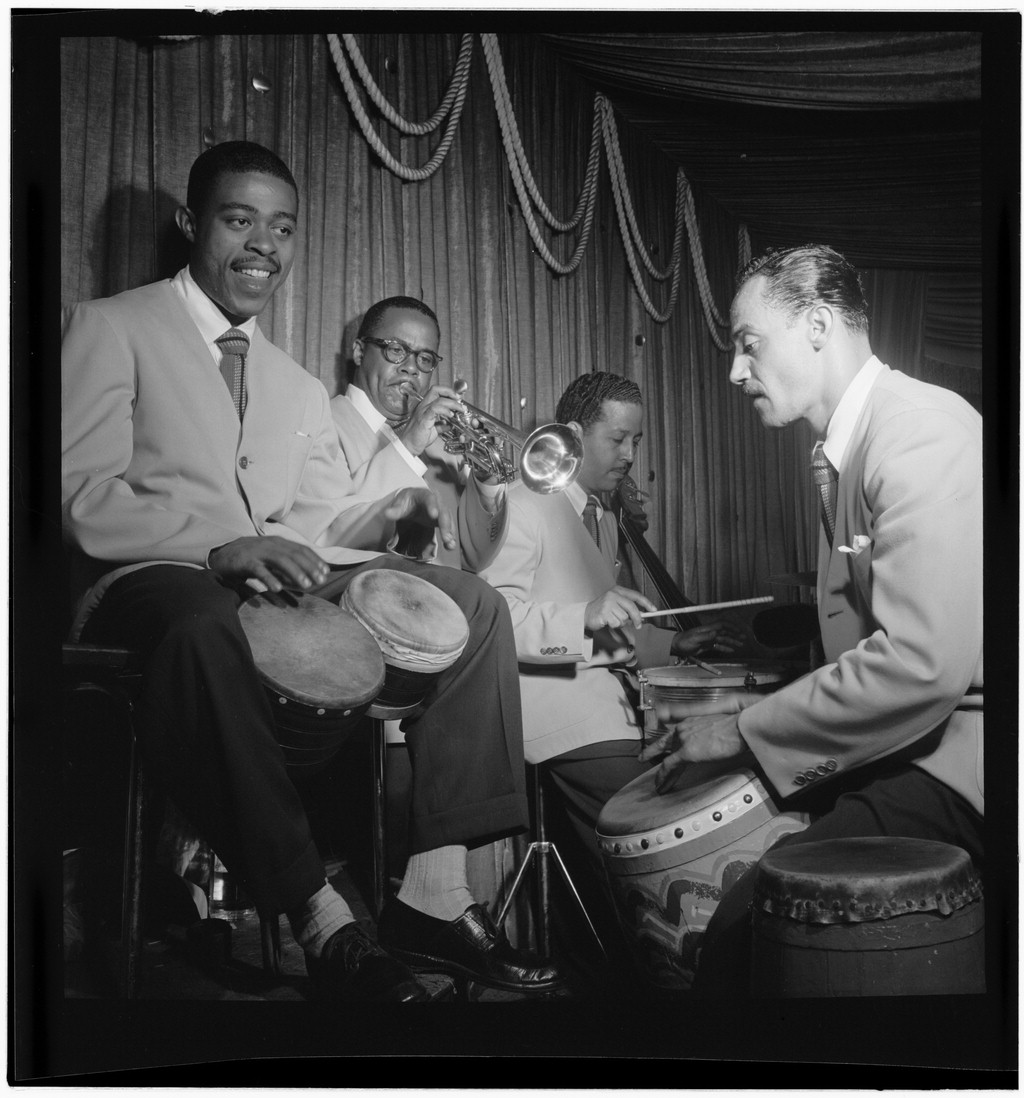
Ubaldo Nieto (center right) on timbales with Machito's Afro-Cubans, 1947

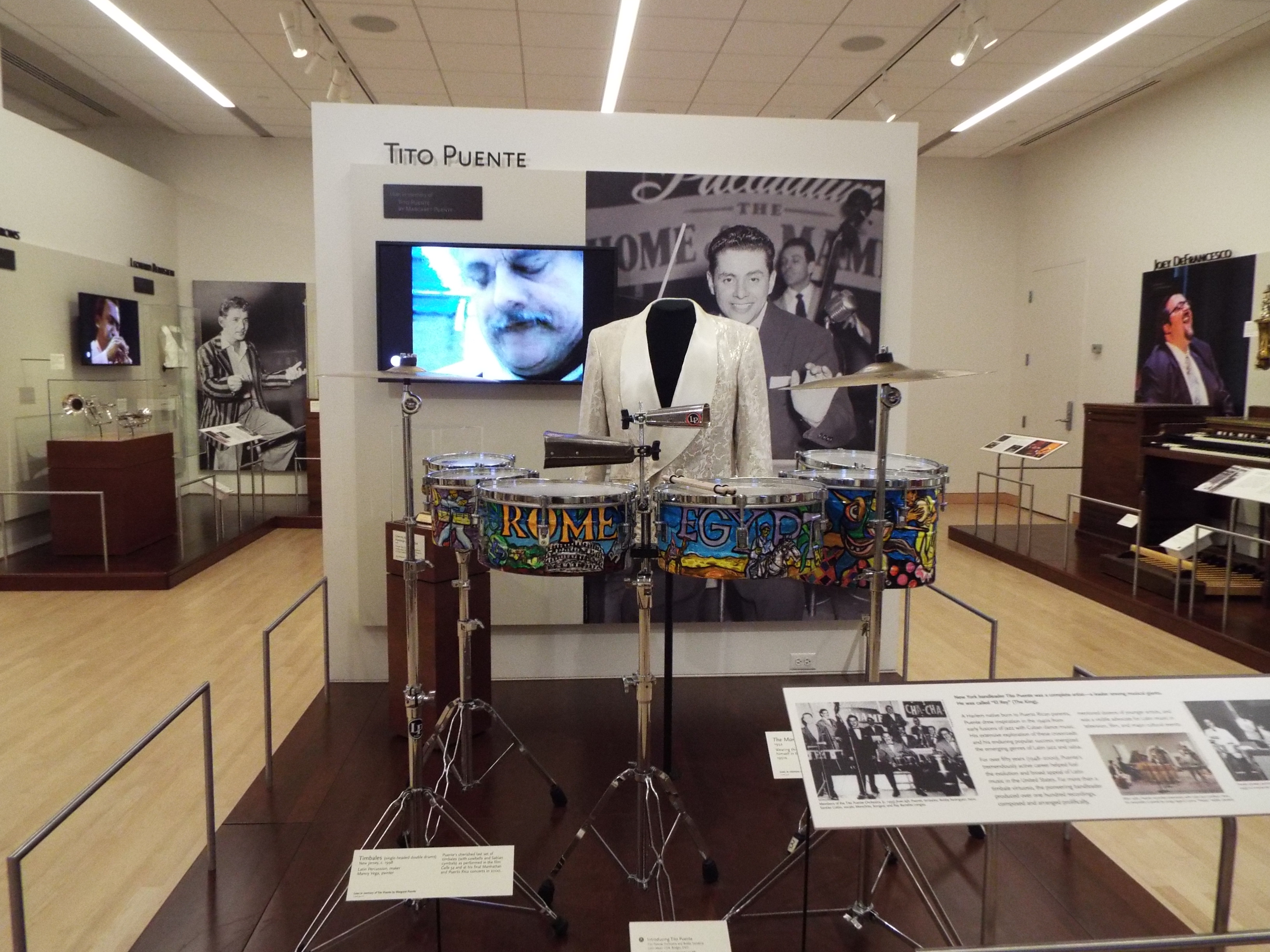
Tito Puente's timbales on exhibit in the Musical Instrument Museum of Phoenix

=== Origins and popularization ===
Timpani were imported into Cuba in the 19th century and used by wind orchestras known as orquestas típicas. These were the same general type of drum used in military bands and symphony orchestras. They were, and are, played with mallets (sticks with large, soft, round heads). Timpani were replaced by pailas, which were made from the body of a commonly used metal pan (later, cans of lard were used to make timbalitos). These new timbales were originally designed to be used by street bands. Unlike classical timpani, these are always hit with straight batons (thinner than standard drumsticks, and not shaped: they are of uniform thickness along the length) that have no additional head.

Timbales became an integral part of a smaller type of orchestra that superseded the orquestas típicas in the early 20th century, the charanga. Ulpiano Díaz, timbalero in some of the most popular charangas in Cuba, those directed by Tata Alfonso, Antonio Arcaño and later José Fajardo, was the first to add a cowbell and to popularize the abanico technique in the 1930s. In the 1950s, timbalero Silvano "Chori" Shueg became a sensation in the nightclubs of Havana due to his skillful improvisations on timbales and other homemade percussion instruments, while Walfredo de los Reyes and Guillermo Barreto explored new idioms with the instrument in jam sessions known as descargas; they were influenced by American jazz drummers such as Max Roach and often doubled on the drum kit. Walfredo was an important influence on his student Amadito Valdés, later a member of Buena Vista Social Club, and his own sons Walfredo Reyes Jr. and Daniel de los Reyes. In the 1970s, innovations in timbales playing mostly came from songo groups such as Orquesta Revé, directed by timbalero Elio Revé, Orquesta Ritmo Oriental, featuring Daniel Díaz on timbales, and Los Van Van, whose timbaleros, first Blas Egües and later Changuito became masters of the instrument. In the 1990s, Changuito filmed a series of instructional videos on timbales, as well as congas and drums, which were released on VHS.

=== In the United States ===
Ubaldo Nieto, timbalero in Machito and his Afro-Cubans, was one of the first musicians to popularize the instrument in the United States. However, it was New York-born percussionist and bandleader Tito Puente who became the leading figure for the rest of the 20th century, often being referred to as the "king of the timbales". He often acted as a bandleader in his studio recordings, leaving the timbales spot for up-and-coming artists such as Willie Bobo and Monchito, son of bandleader Rafael Muñoz. Several other Puerto Rican timbaleros also rose to prominence during the 1950s, like Willie Rodríguez, Humberto Morales and Rafael Cortijo. The former two often played in mambo and Latin jazz bands, while Cortijo established one of Puerto Rico's most popular groups, Cortijo y su Combo. In the 1960s, the incipient New York salsa scene saw the emergence of Kako, Manny Oquendo, Jimmy Sabater, Orestes Vilató and Nicky Marrero. Timbales were also popular in boogaloo bands such as Pucho & His Latin Soul Brothers, whose leader was timbalero Henry "Pucho" Brown. In the 1970s, timbales began to be used in other genres such as Latin rock and reggae. Mexican-American percussionist Pete Escovedo, his brother Coke and his daughter Sheila all became accomplished timbaleros in rock, jazz and funk. Later on, timbales were introduced in hip hop by percussionists such as Eric Bobo, the son of Willie Bobo.

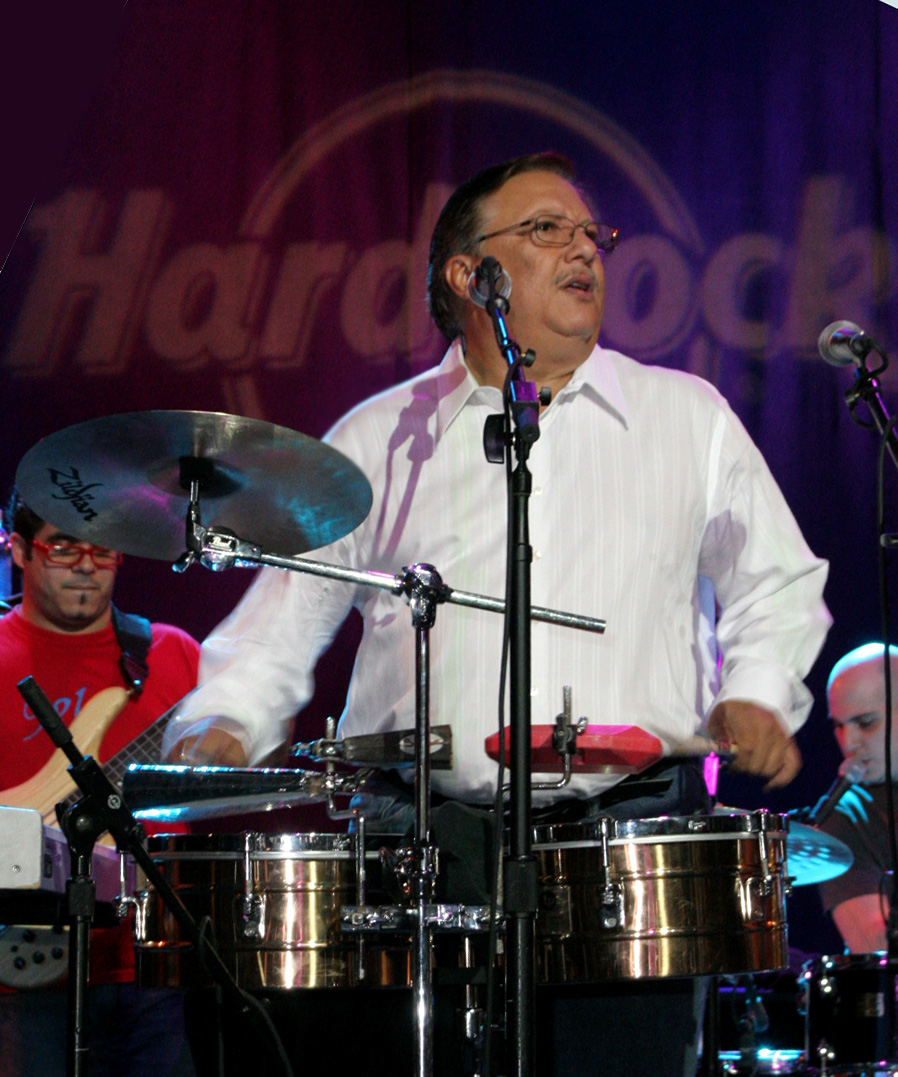
Arturo Sandoval on timbales at the Hard Rock Cafe, Times Square

== Technique ==
=== Baqueteo ===
The basic timbales part for danzón is called the baqueteo. In the example below, the slashed noteheads indicate muted drum strokes, and the regular noteheads indicate open strokes. The danzón was the first written music to be based on the organizing principle of sub-Saharan African rhythm, known in Cuba as clave.

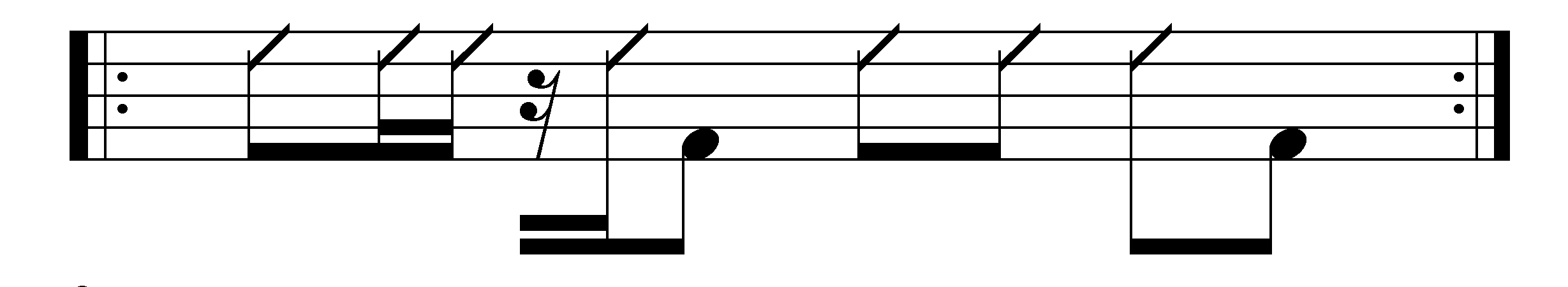
Basic baqueteo timbales part.

=== Bell patterns ===
During the mambo era of the 1940s, timbaleros began to mount cowbells on their drums. The cowbells, or wood blocks, may be mounted slightly above and between the two timbales a little further from the player. The following four timbale bell patterns are based on the folkloric rumba cáscara part. They are written in 3-2 clave sequence.

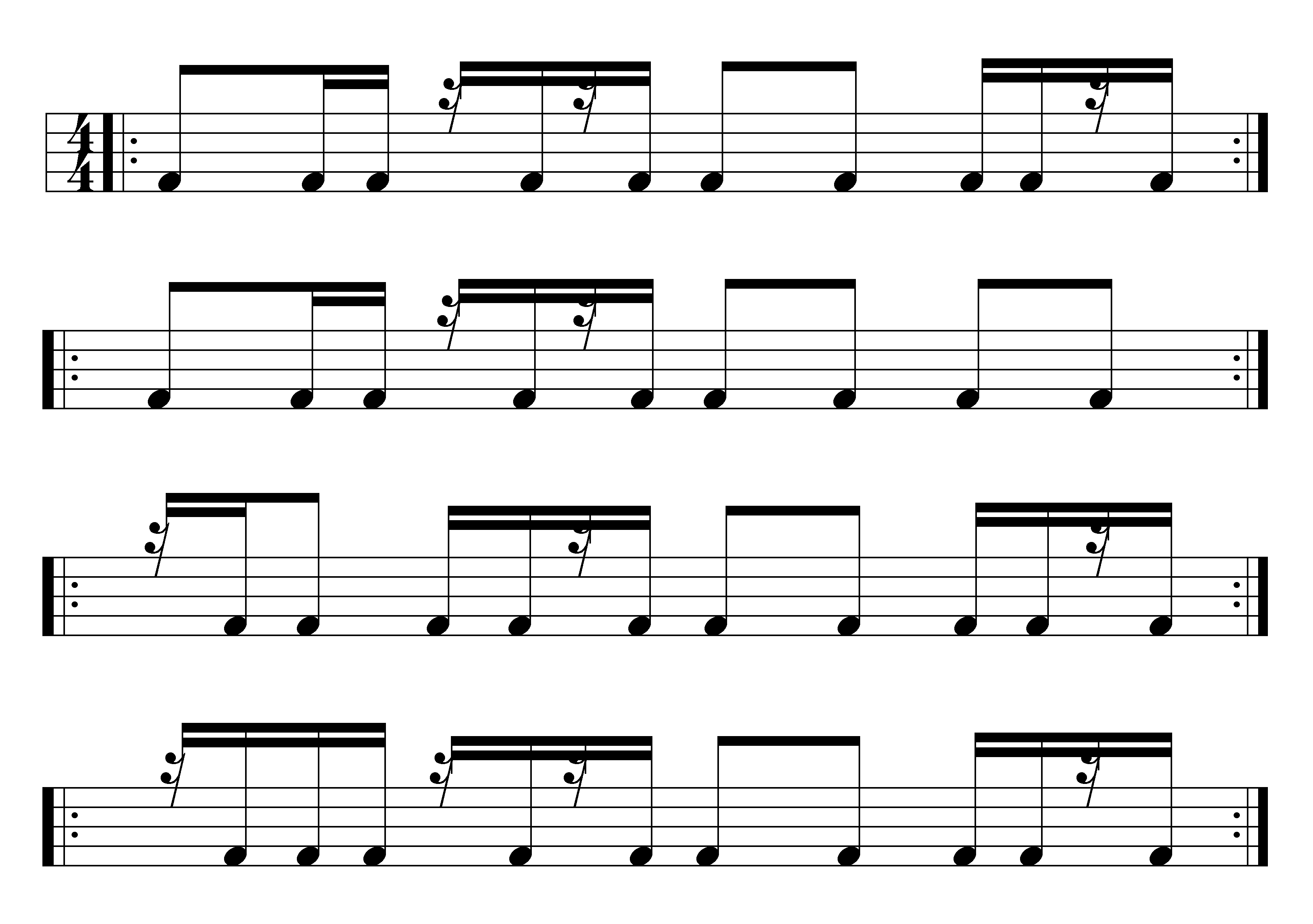
Four different timbale bell patterns., 2, 3, 4

In the 1970s José Luis Quintana "Changuito" developed the technique of simultaneously playing timbale and bongo bell parts when he held the timbales chair in the songo band Los Van Van. The example below shows the combined bell patterns (written in a 2–3 clave sequence).

Two interlocking cowbells, the "Changuito Special."

Tito Puente was frequently seen in concerts, and on posters and album covers, with seven or eight timbales in one set. The timbales were occasionally expanded with drum kit pieces, such as a kick or snare drum. By the late 1970s this became the norm in the genre known as songo. Changuito and others brought rumba and funk influences into timbales playing. In contemporary timba bands, drummers, such as Calixto Oviedo, often use a timbales/drum kit hybrid.

=== Solos ===
==== Típico style ====
The original style of soloing on timbales is known as típico ('typical'). Manny Oquendo (1931–2009) played timbales solos famous for their tastefully sparse, straight forward típico phrasing. The following five measure excerpt is from a timbales solo by Oquendo on "Mambo." The clave pattern is written above for reference. Notice how the passage begins and ends by coinciding with the strokes of clave.

==== Rumba quinto rhythmic vocabulary ====
By the late 1940s and early 1950s, some timbaleros ('timbales players'), particularly Tito Puente, began incorporating the rhythmic vocabulary of rumba quinto into their solos.

== Derivative instruments ==
=== Timbalitos ===
Timbalitos or pailitas are small timbales with diameters of 15 centimetres (6 in), 20 centimetres (8 in) or 25 centimetres (10 in). The timbalitos are used to play the part of the bongos with sticks, but are not used to play the traditional timbales part. Manteca, Papaíto, Félix Escobar "El Gallego" and Manny Oquendo were masters at playing the bongó part on timbalitos. Timbalitos are sometimes incorporated into expanded timbales set-ups, or incorporated into drum kits. The instrument was invented in Cuba in the mid 1920's as a substitute for the bongó which at the time was outlawed in La Habana by the then President of Cuba, Gerardo Machado. The groups at this time that predominantly used it were La Gloria Mantancera and La Sonora Mantancera.

=== Mini timbales ===
Mini timbales small timbales, similar to timbalitos, sometimes used by rock drummers as part of their drum kits. For examples, drummer John Dolmayan of System of a Down is known for using two (6" and 8") mini timbales in his kit and Dave Mackintosh uses a pair of 8" diameter attack timbales 9" and 11" deep made by Meinl Percussion to produce a similar sound to a pair of octobans. Meinl also produce a set of mini timbales of traditional depth but 8" and 10" diameter, also suitable for drum kit usage.

=== Marching Timbales ===
The Ohio University Marching 110 is the only collegiate marching band in the United States to march timbales in their percussion section. Timbales were added to the band in 1971, accompanying five snare drums, two bass drums, two tenor bass drums, and two sets of cymbals. The band does not use a normal set of multi tenor drums that most marching bands do, and instead use a combination of timbales and duo-tenor drums to fulfill the mid-ranges of the percussion section's sound. Together, the section is known as the "Middle Voices" or "Middles".
