= Danzón-mambo =

Subgenre of Cuban dance music

The danzón-mambo (also known as danzón de nuevo ritmo) is a subgenre of Cuban dance music that marked the transition from the classical danzόn to the mambo and the cha-cha-chá. It was also in the context of the danzón-mambo that the Cuban dance band format called charanga reached its present form.

== Origins ==
The danzón-mambo was created by the musicians and arrangers of Antonio Arcaño's charanga, Arcaño y sus Maravillas, which was founded in 1937 (Orovio 1981:324). According to Santos (1982),

The main forces behind Arcano's mambo were the Lopez brothers, Orestes ... and Israel (the great "Cachao") ..., who did most of the composing and arranging for the group, and played the 'cello and the string bass, respectively.

== Characteristics ==
Generally speaking, the danzón-mambo represents a further and stronger incorporation of elements of the son into the danzón. The first sections, or danzones, did not depart significantly from the traditional danzón structure . But, the final section of the danzón-mambo was based on tumbaos and guajeos from the montuno section of the son, which created a complex, clave-oriented polyphony with strong accents on the upbeat (Santos 1982). In order to further reinforce the son feeling, Arcaño added the tumbadora (conga drum) to the traditional charanga percussion lineup of pailas and güiro. Also, the paila player began to use a cowbell in the final section (Santos 1982). This final section, at first called nuevo ritmo, later came to be called mambo.

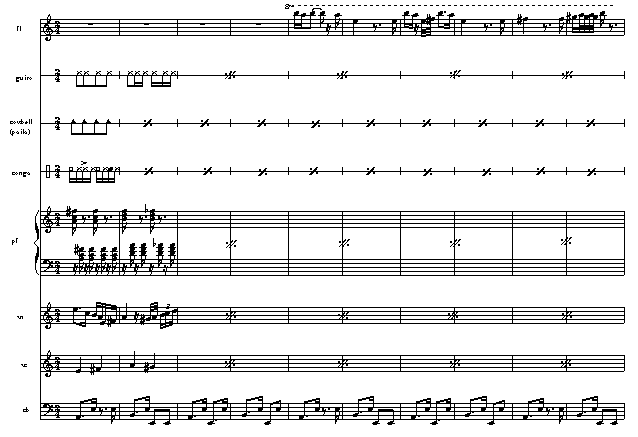
Beginning of the final or mambo section of Angoa (1948) by Félix Reina (Santos 1982)

== Later development ==
Out of the danzón-mambo came both the mambo and the cha-cha-chá. The mambo would subsequently become a genre played mainly by American-style big bands, and as such, did not pose a threat to the danzón-mambo. But, in the face of the sudden overwhelming popularity of the cha-cha-chá in the 1950s, the danzón-mambo began to disappear. However, a convention arose of playing the final section of the danzón-mambo with a cha-cha-chá rhythm, enabling the dancers to dance both the danzón and the cha-cha-chá in the course of the same composition. This became known as the danzón-cha and is the form of danzón most favored by dancers in Cuba at present.

== Discography ==
- The Cuban Danzon: Its Ancestors and Descendants 1982. Various Artists. Folkways Records FW04066.
- De Nuevo El Monarca. 1993. Antonio Arcaño y sus Maravillas. ARTEX CD-069.

== See also ==
- "Chanchullo"
