= Cha-cha-chá (music) =

Genre of Cuban music

- Stylistic origins: Danzón; mambo; son montuno
- Cultural origins: Early 1950s, Cuba
- Typical instruments: Trumpet; trombone; saxophone; conga; bongo; timbales; cowbell; güiro; maracas; piano; harpsichord; bass guitar; voice
- Derivative forms: Salsa; Latin pop

Other topics
- Cuban music; light music; easy listening

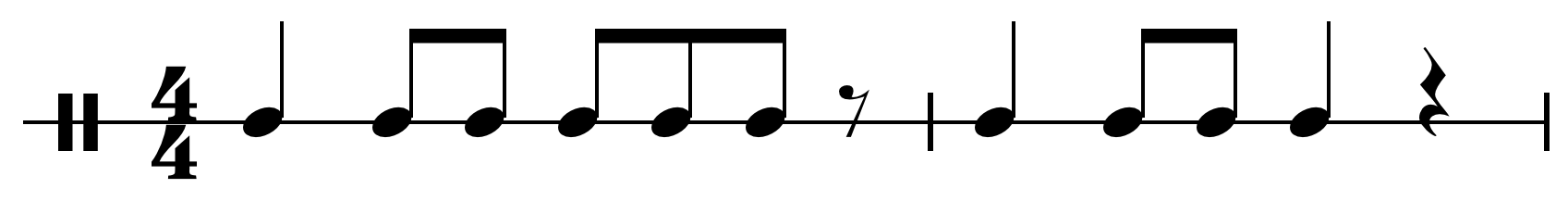
Cha-cha-chá rhythm.

Cha-cha-chá (Spanish pronunciation: [ˌtʃa ˌtʃa ˈtʃa]) is a genre of Cuban music. It has been a popular dance music which developed from the danzón-mambo in the early 1950s, and became widely popular throughout the world.

== Origin ==
The creation of cha-cha-chá has been traditionally attributed to Cuban composer and violinist Enrique Jorrín, who began his career playing for the charanga band Orquesta América.

According to the testimony of Enrique Jorrín, he composed some danzones in which musicians of the orchestra had to sing short refrains, and this style was very successful. In the danzón "Constancia", he introduced some montunos and the audience was motivated to join in singing the refrains. Jorrín also asked the members of the orchestra to sing in unison so the lyrics might be heard more clearly and achieve a greater impact in the audience. That way of singing also helped to mask the poor singing skills of the orchestra members.

In 1948, Jorrín changed the style of a Mexican song by Guty Cárdenas, called "Nunca", composing a separate part for the trio or montuno of danzón; and in 1951 he composed a signature cha-cha-chá, "La engañadora". Jorrín noticed that most of the dancers had some trouble with highly syncopated rhythms and therefore he simplified the musical texture of his pieces, using as little syncopation as possible. The novel cha-cha-chá style was born from melodies that were very easy to dance.

Since its inception, cha-cha-chá music has had a close relationship with the dancer's steps. The name cha-cha-chá came into being with the help of the dancers at the Silver Star Club in Havana. When the dance was coupled to the rhythm of the music, it became evident that the dancer's feet were making a peculiar sound as they grazed the floor on three successive beats. Cha-cha-chá was an onomatopoeia to describe this sound.

== Characteristics ==
Typical piano accompaniment to a cha-cha-chá (Orovio 1981:132)

According to Odilio Urfé, cha-cha-chá was a musical genre that was based on the rhythm of danzón-mambo but with a different structural conception. It utilized elements of chotis madrileño and a monodic vocal style. After "La Engañadora", Urfé's original structure was greatly modified by Jorrín and other composers.

Cuban musicologist Olavo Alén emphasizes the inheritance that cha-cha-chá received from danzón. He says that actually, cha-cha-chá appears to be a derivative of danzón. It maintains a very similar structure to that of danzón, while transforming the melodic and rhythmic elements used in the composition of each of its sections. The interpretative function of the flute is retained: its role as a soloist, and the characteristics of its improvisation in danzón reappear in cha-cha-chá with hardly any alteration. The melodies of the violins alternate with those of the flute and the voices in a way that became standardized in danzón and danzonete.

The principal element that differentiates cha-cha-chá from danzón is the rhythmic cell that gives its name to the genre. It is also significant that cha-cha-chá abandons the elements from son that were incorporated into the danzonete, and returns to the strict utilization of stylistic elements that arose and were developed in the context of the danzón.

== Further development ==
According to Olavo Alén: "During the 1950s, cha-cha-chá maintained its popularity thanks to the efforts of many Cuban composers who were familiar with the technique of composing danzones and who unleashed their creativity on the cha-cha-chá", such as Rosendo Ruiz, [Jr.] ("Los Marcianos" and "Rico Vacilón"), Félix Reina ("Dime Chinita", "Como Bailan Cha-cha-chá los Mexicanos"), Richard Egües ("El Bodeguero" and "La Cantina") and Rafael Lay ("Cero Codazos, Cero Cabezazos").

Although the cha-cha-chá rhythm originated with Orquesta América, some scholars, including John Santos (1982), consider the Orquesta Aragón of Rafael Lay and Richard Egües, and the orchestra Fajardo y sus Estrellas of José Fajardo, to have been particularly influential in the development of cha-cha-chá. The coincidental ascendance of television and LP records in the 1950s were significant factors in the sudden international popularity of the music and dance of cha-cha-chá.

Cha-cha-chá was first presented to the public through the instrumental medium of charanga, a typical Cuban dance band format made up of a flute, strings, piano, bass and percussion. The popularity of cha-cha-chá also revived the popularity of this kind of orchestra.

== See also ==
- Cha-cha-cha (dance)

== Discography ==
- Orquesta Enrique Jorrín; "Todo Chachachá"; Egrem CD-0044
- Johnny Pacheco; "Early Rhythms"; Musical Productions MP-3162 CD
- Randy Carlos and his Orchestra; "Pachanga con Cha Cha Cha"; Fiesta FLPS-1313
- Various orchestras; "El chachachá me encanta"; Egrem CD-0503
