= Redenzione =

Redenzione can refer to:

- Redenzione (1919 film), an Italian film
- Redenzione (1952 film), an Italian film
