= Antonio Arcaño =

Cuban flautist and bandleader (1911–1994)

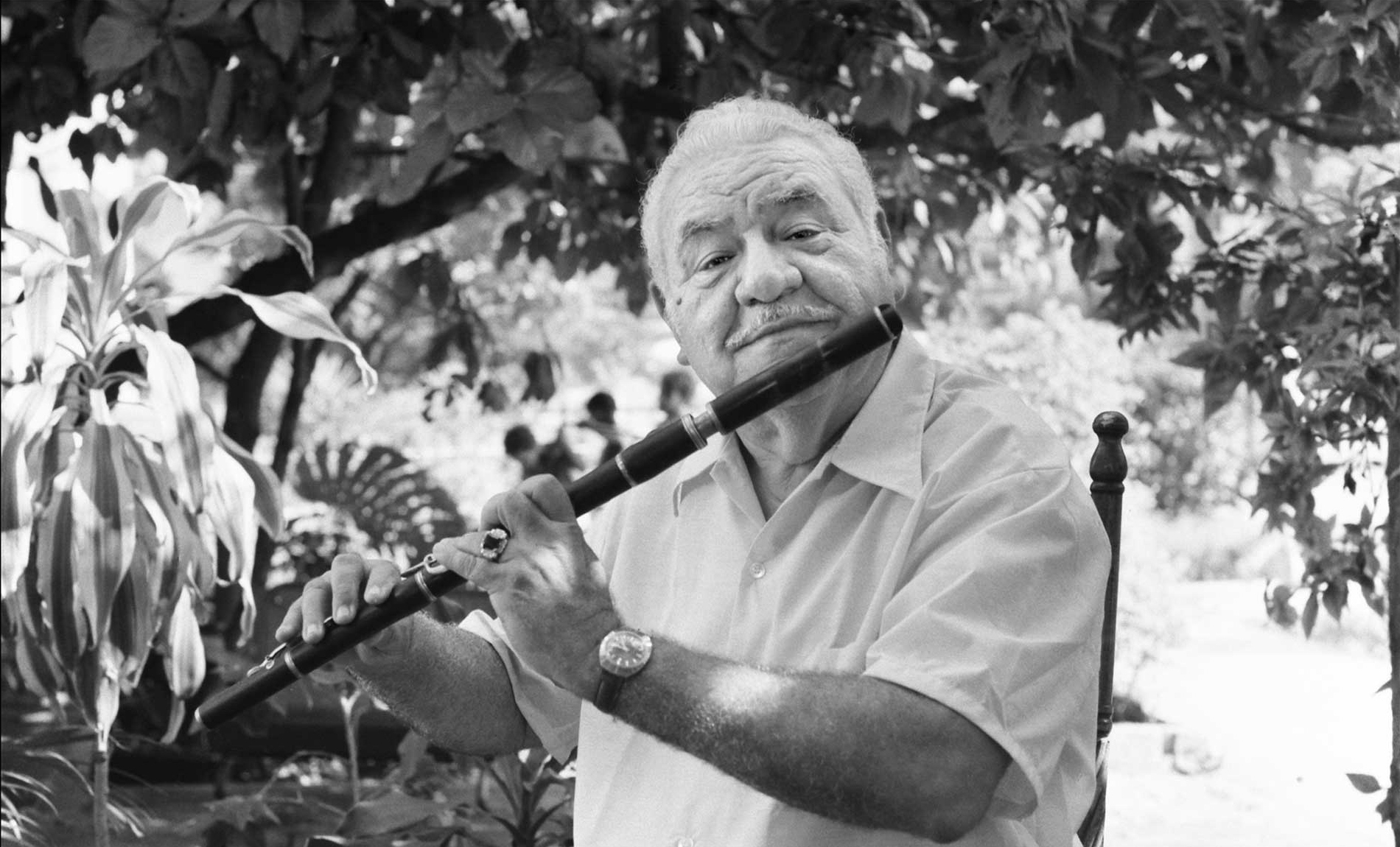
- Antonio Arcaño in 1970.

Background information
- Born: Antonio Arcaño Betancourt; 29 December 1911; Havana, Cuba
- Died: 1994 (aged 82–83)
- Genres: Danzón
- Occupations: Musician; bandleader
- Instrument: Flute
- Formerly of: Arcaño y sus Maravillas

Antonio Arcaño Betancourt (Atarés, Havana 29 December 1911 – 1994) was a Cuban flautist, bandleader and founder of Arcaño y sus Maravillas, one of Cuba's most successful charangas. He retired from playing in 1945, but continued as director of the group until its dissolution in 1958. Despite his early retirement due to health problems, he is considered one of the most influential flautists in Cuba.

After leaving La Maravilla del Siglo, a very popular charanga, Arcaño founded La Maravilla de Arcaño, later known as Arcaño y sus Maravillas. The band featured the López brothers, Israel López "Cachao" and Orestes López, composers and multi-instrumentalists that originated the danzón-mambo, the direct precursor of the mambo, through compositions such as "Rareza de Melitón", "Se va el matancero" and, above all, "Mambo", the piece that lent its name to the genre. Arcaño was posthumously inducted into the International Latin Music Hall of Fame in 2000.

== See also ==
- José Fajardo
- Enrique Jorrín
- Félix Reina
