= José Urfé =

Musical artist (1879–1957)

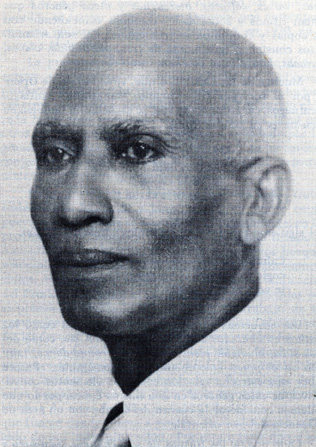

Background information
- Born: José Urfé González; February 6, 1879; Madruga, Cuba
- Died: November 14, 1957 (aged 78) Havana, Cuba
- Genres: Danzón, contradanza, criolla
- Occupations: Musician, composer
- Instrument: Clarinet

José Urfé González (February 6, 1879 – November 14, 1957) was a Cuban clarinetist and composer. An innovator of the danzón, his 1910 composition "El bombín de Barreto" pioneered the introduction of elements from son cubano into the genre.

Urfé was born in Madruga, Havana Province, on February 6, 1879. He studied music with several tutors in his home town and in Havana before joining the Teatro Payret orchestra, where he was coached by Pedro Pablo Díaz. In 1902 he was one of the founding members of Enrique Peña's orchestra, where he played second clarinet to José Belén Puig. Later the two clarinetists left to join the Félix González band.

Urfé composed habaneras, criollas, danzones and religious music. He travelled to Mexico and the United States as a member of theatre orchestras. His famous number "El bombín de Barreto" (1910) incorporated a sychopated third part derived from the son. It was named after his friend's bowler hat. Other well-known compositions by Urfé include "Fefita", "Nena", "El churrero", "El dios chino" and "El progreso". His four sons, Odilio, Orestes, José and Esteban were all musicians

Urfé died in Havana on November 14, 1957.
