= Orlando "Cachaíto" López =

Cuban bassist and composer

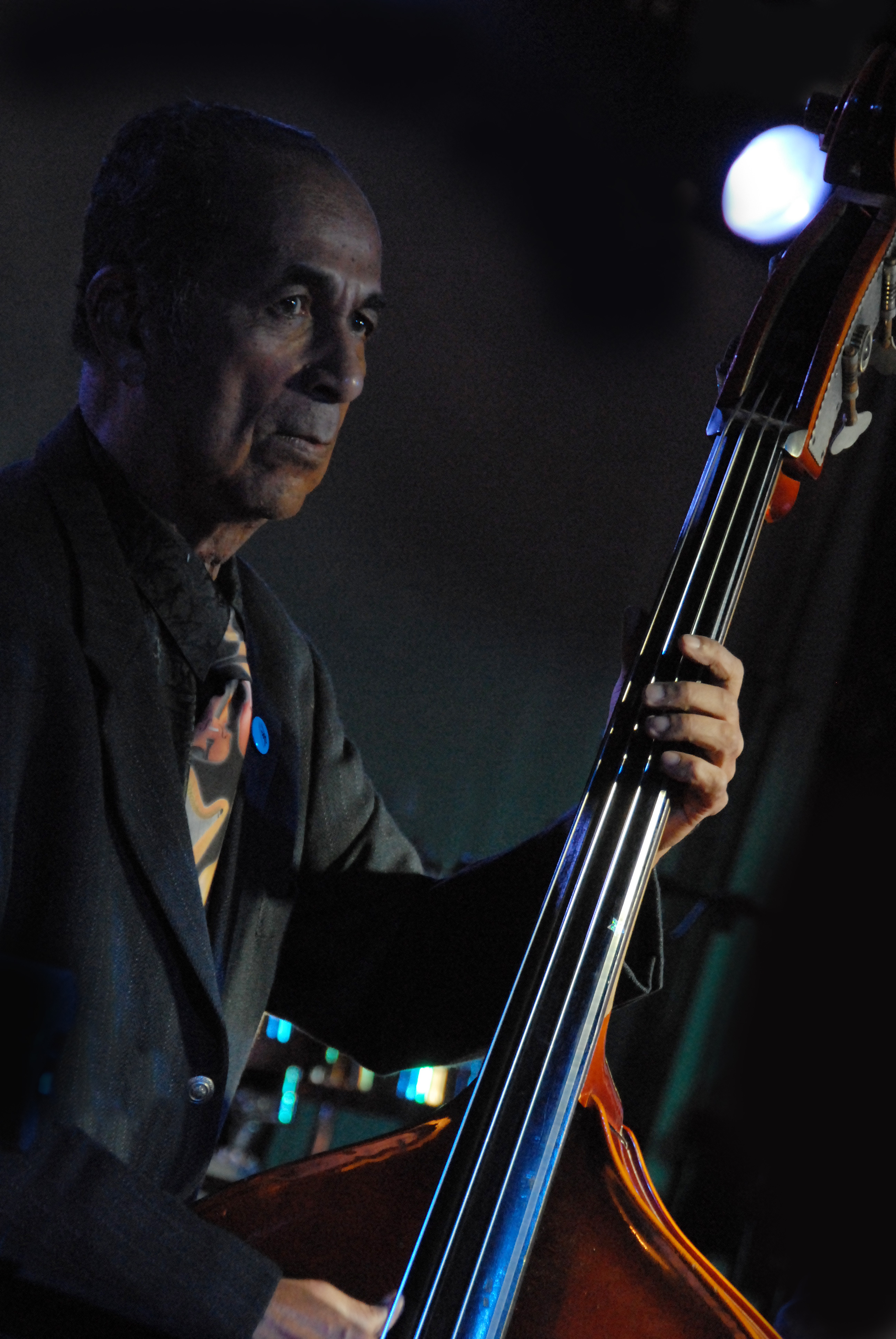
- Orlando "Cachaíto" López Known as 'The heartbeat of the Buena Vista Social Club'

Background information
- Birth name: Candelario Orlando López Vergara
- Born: February 2, 1933; Havana, Cuba
- Died: February 9, 2009 (aged 76); Havana, Cuba
- Genres: Danzón, mambo, descarga, son, Afro-Cuban jazz
- Occupation(s): Musician, composer
- Instrument: Double bass
- Years active: 1940s–2009

Candelario Orlando López Vergara (February 2, 1933 – February 9, 2009), better known as Cachaíto, was a Cuban bassist and composer, who gained international fame after his involvement in the Buena Vista Social Club recordings. He was nicknamed Cachaíto ("little Cachao") after his uncle, the famous bassist and innovator of mambo music Israel "Cachao" López. His father and Cachao's older brother was Orestes López, also a famous bassist/multi-instrumentalist and composer.

== Life and career ==
Born in Havana on February 2, 1933, Orlando "Cachaíto" López first got actively involved in music when he was only nine years old. His early desire was to play the violin, but his grandfather Pedro insisted he take up the double bass, as there had been a long tradition of bassists in the López family, a trend that they did not want stopped. He started learning the double bass on a cello, quickly moving onto a double bass when he was large enough. His musical career is said to have started when he was twelve, and at the age of 13, Cachaíto composed his first piece, a danzón called "Isora Infantil", a reference to his aunt Coralia's famous piece "Isora Club". In fact, it was Coralia's orchestra where Cachaíto made his debut in the 1940s. By the time he was 17, he replaced his uncle as the bassist with Antonio Arcaño y sus Maravillas. He made such an impression on the group that he was asked to stay.

In the 1950s, he helped popularize the descarga style of music that is a mix between jazz-styled improvisation with Afro-Cuban rhythms, and by 1957 he was playing with the hugely popular Havana dance band, Orquesta Riverside. In the 1960s, he became a bassist with the National Symphony Orchestra, and he took classes with the Czech bassist Karel Kopriva. Cachaíto also collaborated with renowned pianists Peruchín, Frank Emilio Flynn and Chucho Valdés, as well as percussionists Tata Güines and Angá Díaz.

In 1996 López was hired by Juan de Marcos González for his Afro-Cuban All Stars, signing to World Circuit, and at the same time becoming a member of the resulting Buena Vista Social Club project and appearing in Wim Wenders' documentary Buena Vista Social Club. After a career spanning some 60 years, Cachaíto made his debut solo album in 2001 and continued to tour with the Buena Vista Social Club musicians (Manuel "Guajiro" Mirabal, Jesús "Aguaje" Ramos, Manuel Galbán, etc.).

Cachaíto died in a hospital in Havana on February 9, 2009, after complications from pancreatic cancer surgery. He was 76.

== Discography ==
- Cachaíto (2001, World Circuit)
