= Orestes López =

Cuban multi-instrumentalist, composer and bandleader (1908–1991)

- Also known as: Macho
- Born: Orestes López Valdés; August 28, 1908; Old Havana, Havana, Cuba
- Died: January 26, 1991 (aged 82) Old Havana, Havana, Cuba
- Genres: Danzón, mambo, classical music
- Occupations: Musician, bandleader, composer, arranger
- Instruments: Piano, cello, double bass
- Labels: Panart, Gema, Maype
- Formerly of: Cachao, Abelardo Barroso, Arcaño y sus Maravillas, Havana Philharmonic Orchestra, National Symphony Orchestra of Cuba

Orestes López Valdés (August 28, 1908 – January 26, 1991), nicknamed Macho, was a Cuban multi-instrumentalist, composer and bandleader. As a double bassist he was a founding member of the Havana Philharmonic Orchestra, and later a member of the National Symphony Orchestra of Cuba. A long-time member of the charanga Arcaño y sus Maravillas, where he played cello and piano, he is considered the co-creator of the mambo, together with his brother Israel "Cachao" López, and one of the most prolific danzón composers of the 20th century.

== Biography ==
=== Early life and career ===
Orestes López was born in Old Havana on August 28, 1908, into a family of musicians. As a pre-teenager he studied piano, cello, violin and the five-key ebony flute. In 1924, at age 15, he became double bassist for the newly founded Havana Philharmonic Orchestra directed by Pedro Sanjuán. A few years later, he was playing bass for Miguel "El Moro" Vázquez's charanga. According to his brother Cachao, in 1926 he was a member of Grupo Apolo, the first septeto to include a trumpet.

Family

He married Georgina Vergara with whom he had 5 children: Irene Herlinda, Gertrudiz Lidia, Candelario Orestes, Adela Minerva, Orlando and Georgina.

=== Arcaño y sus Maravillas ===
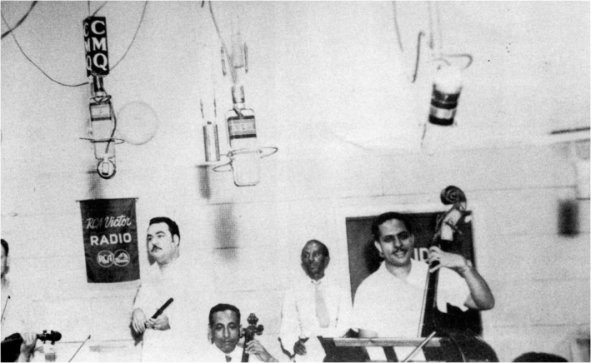
Arcaño y sus Maravillas at Radio CMQ, c. 1945: Arcaño on flute, Orestes López on cello (seated), Cachao on bass.

In the 1930s he was the musical director of three dance orchestras: López-Barroso, Orquesta de Orestes López and La Unión, before joining Antonio Arcaño y sus Maravillas in 1937 as a founding member. López, a multi-instrumentalist, composed and orchestrated danzones, most notably "Camina Juan Pescao", "El truco de Regatillo", "Los tres bailadores" and "Mambo", which launched a new style of danzón, the so-called danzón-mambo. Subsequently, the syncopated bass in the tune gave rise on the one hand to the dance genre known as mambo popularized by Pérez Prado, and on the other hand to the cha-cha-chá, created by Enrique Jorrín.

In the late 1930s, the danzón had three movements: the introduction, el paseo (the walk in a circle), and la comparsa (the main theme, in which dancers faced each other and danced). López's danzón-mambo, also called danzón de nuevo ritmo, changed the third movement when he substituted a montuno (based on the syncopated beat of the son-playing treseros from Oriente). López's montuno of two to four beats took on a special syncopated character and was given the generic name of mambo.

Although the Maravillas disbanded in 1958, López remained active in the popular music scene, playing piano in several of Cachao's descarga albums recorded between 1957 and 1960, including the successful Cuban Jam Sessions in Miniature.

=== Later years and death ===
His younger brother Cachao emigrated to Spain in 1961 and then to the US in 1963, and achieved considerable success, but Orestes remained in Cuba. He died in Havana on January 26, 1991. In 2000, Orestes was posthumously inducted into the International Latin Music Hall of Fame, joining his brother, who had been inducted a year earlier. Orestes was survived by his son, Orlando "Cachaíto" López (1933–2009) who was also a double bassist. Cachaito gained fame as the ever-present performer for the Buena Vista Social Club.

== Compositions ==
Many of his compositions were named after the clubs where Arcaño y sus Maravillas would play their daily shows. He and his brother would continuously compose new tunes for every concert.

- "Arcaño"
- "Arriba la invasión"
- "Avance Juvenil de Ciego de Ávila"
- "Caballeros, coman vianda"
- "Camina Juan Pescao"
- "Carraguao se botó" (also known as "Lágrima")
- "Catorce de septiembre"
- "Chifla"
- "Club Social de Marianao"
- "El moro eléctrico"
- "El que más goza"
- "El Progreso de Tinguaro"
- "El truco de Regatillo"
- "En el cabildo"
- "Esto es crema"
- "Flores de mayo"
- "Hágase socio"
- "Las ninfas"
- "Llegaron los millonarios"
- "Los Jóvenes de La Defensa"
- "Los tres bailadores"
- "Los tres chiflados"
- "Mambo"
- "Nace una estrella"
- "Nobles y sencillos"
- "Pasarán los años"
- "Rapsodia en azul"
- "Redención"
- "Rosa que no se marchita"
- "Silvio al bate"
- "Sociedad Antonio Maceo de Camagüey"
- "Soy matancero"

== See also ==
- Coralia López
