= Mambo (music) =

Cuban music genre

- Stylistic origins: Danzón; swing; son cubano
- Cultural origins: Late 1930s, Havana, Cuba
- Typical instruments: Piano; double bass; conga; timbales; horns; strings
- Derivative forms: Cha-cha-cha; salsa; funk; dengue

Fusion genres
- Guaracha-mambo; bolero-mambo; son montuno

Mambo is a genre of Cuban dance music pioneered by the charanga Arcaño y sus Maravillas in the late 1930s and later popularized in the big band style by Pérez Prado. It originated as a syncopated form of the danzón, known as danzón-mambo, with a final, improvised section, which incorporated the guajeos typical of son cubano (also known as montunos). These guajeos became the essence of the genre when it was played by big bands, which did not perform the traditional sections of the danzón and instead leaned towards swing and jazz. By the late 1940s and early 1950s, mambo had become a "dance craze" in Mexico and the United States as its associated dance took over the East Coast thanks to Pérez Prado, Tito Puente, Tito Rodríguez and others. In the mid-1950s, a slower ballroom style, also derived from the danzón, cha-cha-cha, replaced mambo as the most popular dance genre in North America. Nonetheless, mambo continued to enjoy some degree of popularity into the 1960s and new derivative styles appeared, such as dengue; by the 1970s it had been largely incorporated into salsa.

== History ==
=== Origins in Cuba ===
The earliest roots of mambo can be traced to the danzón de nuevo ritmo (danzón with a new rhythm), later known as danzón-mambo, made popular by the charanga Arcaño y sus Maravillas conducted by flautist Antonio Arcaño.

Orestes López and his brother Israel López "Cachao", main composers of the Maravillas, were the first to denominate a final upbeat, improvised section of the popular Cuban danzón as a mambo. This innovation was a key step in the process of evolution of the danzón, which over the years had progressively lost its structural rigidity to the benefit of musicians and dancers alike. Prior to the danzón de nuevo ritmo, in 1910, José Urfé had first added a montuno (typical son improvised closing section) as a final part of his composition El bombín de Barreto. This was a swinging section consisting of a repeated musical phrase, which introduced some elements of the son into the danzón. During the mid-to-late 1930s, some members of the Arcaño group were saying vamos a mambear ("let's mambo") when referring to the montuno or final improvisation of the danzón. It was Arcaño's cellist, Orestes López, who created the first danzón called "Mambo" (1938). In this piece, some syncopated motives taken from the son style were combined with improvised flute passages.

Antonio Arcaño described the mambo as follows: "Mambo is a type of syncopated montuno that possesses the rhythmic charm, informality and eloquence of the Cuban people. The pianist attacks the mambo, the flute picks it up and improvises, the violin executes rhythmic chords in double stops, the double bass inserts a tumbao, the timbalero plays the cowbell, the güiro scrapes and plays the maracas rhythm, the indispensable tumba (conga drum) reaffirms the bass tumbao and strengthens the timbal."

=== 1940-1952: "Brass" Mambo in Mexico City ===
Dámaso Pérez Prado, a pianist and arranger from Matanzas, Cuba, established his residence in Havana at the beginning of the 1940s and began to work at night clubs and orchestras, such as Paulina Alvarez's and Casino de La Playa. In 1949 he traveled to Mexico looking for job opportunities and achieved great success with a new style, to which he assigned a name that had been already used by Antonio Arcaño, the mambo.

Perez Prado's style differed from the previous mambo concept. The new style possessed a greater influence from North-American jazz, and an expanded instrumentation consisting of four to five trumpets, four to five saxophones, double bass, drums, maracas, cowbell, congas and bongos. This new mambo included a catchy counterpoint between the trumpets and the saxophones that induced the body to move along with the rhythm, stimulated at the end of each musical phrase by a characteristic deep throat sound expression.

Because his music was aimed at an audience that lived primarily outside Cuba, Pérez Prado used a large number of international influences, especially North-American, in his arrangements. This is evident in his arrangements of songs such as "Mambo Rock", "Patricia" and "Tequila", where he uses a triple meter U.S. "swing" rhythm fused with elements from Cuban rumba and son. Pérez Prado gained hits such as "Mambo No. 5" and "Mambo No. 8" in 1950. The mambo boom peaked in the US in early 1950s, when Pérez Prado hit the American charts at number one with a cha-cha-chá version of "Cherry Pink (and Apple Blossom White)". Pérez Prado's repertoire included numerous international pieces such as "Cerezo Rosa", "María Bonita", "Tea for Two", "La Bikina", "Cuando Calienta El Sol", "Malagueña" and "En Un Pueblito Español", among many others.

Prado's recordings were meant for the Latin American and U.S. latino markets, but some of his most celebrated mambos, such as "Mambo No. 5" and "Que Rico El Mambo", quickly crossed over to a wider U.S. audience.

Cuban singer Beny Moré also lived in Mexico between 1945 and 1952. He composed and recorded some mambos there with Mexican orchestras, especially the one led by Rafael de Paz; they recorded "Yiri Yiri Bon", "La Culebra", "Mata Siguaraya", "Solamente Una Vez" and "Bonito Y Sabroso". Benny and Perez Prado recorded 28 mambo songs including "La Múcura", "Rabo Y Oreja", and "Pachito E'ché". At this time Benny also recorded with the orchestra of Jesús "Chucho" Rodríguez.

=== Mambo in New York City: 1947-1960 ===
Mambo arrived in 1947 and mambo music and dance became popular soon after. Recording companies began to use mambo to label their records and advertisements for mambo dance lessons were in local newspapers. New York City had made mambo a transnational popular cultural phenomenon. In New York the mambo was played in a high-strung, sophisticated way that had the Palladium Ballroom, the famous Broadway dance-hall, jumping. The Ballroom soon proclaimed itself the "temple of mambo", for the city's best dancers—the Mambo Aces, Cha Cha Taps, "Killer Joe" Piro, Augie and Margo Rodríguez. Augie and Margo were still dancing 50 years later (2006) in Las Vegas.

Some of New York's biggest mambo dancers and bands of the 1950s included: Augie & Margo, Michael Terrace & Elita, Carmen Cruz & Gene Ortiz, Larry Selon & Vera Rodríguez, Mambo Aces(Aníbal Vásquez and Samson Batalla), Cha Cha Taps (Carlos Arroyo and Mike Ramos), Killer Joe Piro, Paulito and Lilón, Louie Máquina, Pedro Aguilar (nicknamed "Cuban Pete"), Machito, Tito Rodríguez, Jose Curbelo, and Noro Morales.

By the early 1960s, tastes had shifted, and the Palladium closed in 1966, partly because a drug raid in 1961 led to the loss of its license to sell liquor. Dancers' and music fans' enthusiasm for the music was not entirely diminished, however.

The Village Gate in Greenwich Village offered Latin Night on Mondays and Wednesdays. Federico Pagani started Latin Nights with radio host Symphony Sid Torin and Joe Gaines. Federico Pagani offered a Latin Night at various clubs, including Tony Roma's El Corso on 86th Street and Third Avenue, Barney Googles, and the Cheetah, Casa Blanca, Club Caborrojeño at 96th Street and Broadway, Trudi Heller's Trix, Peppermint Lounge, Les Violins, Village Gate Nightclub, The Roseland, Manhattan Center, The 3 In One In Brooklyn Heights Prospect Park, St. George Hotel, La Época, Cerromar Nightclub, Hippocampo, Caravana Club, Hunts Point Palace, Bronx Casino, La Campana Bar Restaurant, and El Tropicoro established by the world champion boxer Carlos Ortiz in the Bronx. These venues hosted "the scene" after the Palladium. Pagani was an advisor for the film Nuestra Cosa Latina (Our Latin Thing) at the Cheetah and The Red Garter with Symphony Sid Torin.('Mambo Kings'). Pagani produced and was responsible for all the Latin concerts.

== See also ==
- Rhumba
- Enrique Jorrín
- Pachanga
- Guaracha
- Merengue
