= Orquesta América =

Cuban charanga orchestra

Orquesta América is a Cuban charanga orchestra founded in Havana in 1942, and later based in Mexico City and California. The band pioneered the cha-cha-chá in 1953.

== History ==
The band was founded in 1942 by singer Ninón Mondéjar with Alex Sosa (piano), Enrique Jorrín, Antonio Sánchez, and Félix Reina (violins), Juan Ramos (flute) and others. Mondéjar and Sosa went to Mexico, then later revived Orquesta América in California. Success, in Cuba, came in 1953 with Orquesta America's recording of Jorrín's "La engañadora", on the Panart label. However the success of the band led to Mondéjar and Jorrín over whether the bandleader or songwriter should take the credit for the invention of the cha-cha-chá. The band split during a tour of Mexico in December 1954 and Ramos returned to Havana with half of the band to form Orquesta América del '55 in 1955. During that same year Juanito Ramos was replaced by Rolando Lozano flutist (formerly of Orquesta Aragon) and his brother Clemente Lozano also a flutist. In the 1990s leadership of Orquesta America passed to Be Mondéjar and he died in Havana in 2006.

== Partial discography ==
=== Singles ===
- La engañadora / Silver Star (Panart, 1953)
- El alardoso / Negro de sociedad (Panart, 1953)

=== Compilations ===
- Siempre a Punto (Lujuria, 2008)
