= José Fajardo (musician) =

Cuban bandleader and flautist (1919–2001)

- Born: José Antonio Fajardo Ramos; October 18, 1919; Guane, Pinar del Rio, Cuba
- Died: December 11, 2001 (aged 82) New York, United States
- Occupations: Musician, bandleader, composer, arranger
- Instrument: Flute

José Antonio Fajardo Ramos (October 18, 1919 – December 11, 2001) was a Cuban charanga bandleader and flautist, who played the traditional five-keyed wooden flute.

== Life and career ==
Born in Guane, Pinar del Río Province, Fajardo learned the flute from his father, before moving to Havana in the 1930s. He played with the band of Antonio María Romeu and formed his own charanga band in 1949. He defected to the United States in 1961 while touring Japan and reformed his band in New York City with new musicians.

== Death ==
Fajardo died on December 11, 2001, in New York, at the age of 82.
