= Montuno =

Term in Cuban music

Montuno has several meanings pertaining to Cuban music and its derivatives. Literally, montuno means 'comes from the mountain', and so son montuno may refer to the older type of son played in the mountainous rural areas of Oriente. Another possibility is that the word montuno comes from the word montura, the Spanish word for "saddle", because the rhythm in son music is like riding a horse. Or it may mean the final section of a song-based composition; in this sense it is simply part of a piece of music. Here it is usually a faster, brasher, semi-improvised instrumental section, sometimes with a repetitive vocal refrain. Finally, the term montuno is also used for a piano guajeo, the ostinato figure accompanying the montuno section, when it describes a repeated syncopated piano vamp, often with chromatic root movement.

== See also ==
- Call and response (music)
- Coro-pregón
