= Danzón =

Musical genre and dance of Cuba

- Stylistic origins: Contradanza
- Cultural origins: Late 19th century, Cuba
- Typical instruments: Flute; Violin; Piano; Double bass; Timbales; Güiro; Claves
- Derivative forms: Mambo

Other topics
- Rhumba; Meringue; Bolero

Danzón is the official genre and dance of Cuba. It is also an active musical form in the United States and Puerto Rico. Written in 2/4 time, the danzón is a slow, formal partner dance, requiring set footwork around syncopated beats, and incorporating elegant pauses while the couples stand listening to virtuoso instrumental passages, as characteristically played by a charanga or típica ensemble.

The danzón evolved from the Cuban contradanza, or habanera (lit. 'Havana-dance'). The contradanza, which had English and French roots in the country dance and contredanse, was probably introduced to Cuba by the Spanish, who ruled the island for almost four centuries (1511–1898), contributing many thousands of immigrants. It may also have been partially seeded during the short-lived British occupation of Havana in 1762. Haitian refugees fleeing the island's revolution of 1791–1804 brought the French-Haitian kontradans, contributing their own Creole syncopation. In Cuba, the dances of European origin acquired new stylistic features derived from African rhythm and dance to produce a genuine fusion of European and African influences. African musical traits in the danzón include complex instrumental cross-rhythms, expressed in staggered cinquillo and tresillo patterns.

By 1879, the year Miguel Failde's Las alturas de Simpson was first performed (in Matanzas), danzón had emerged as a distinct genre. It went on to interact with 20th century Cuban genres such as son, and through the danzón-mambo it was instrumental in the development of mambo and cha-cha-chá.

== History ==
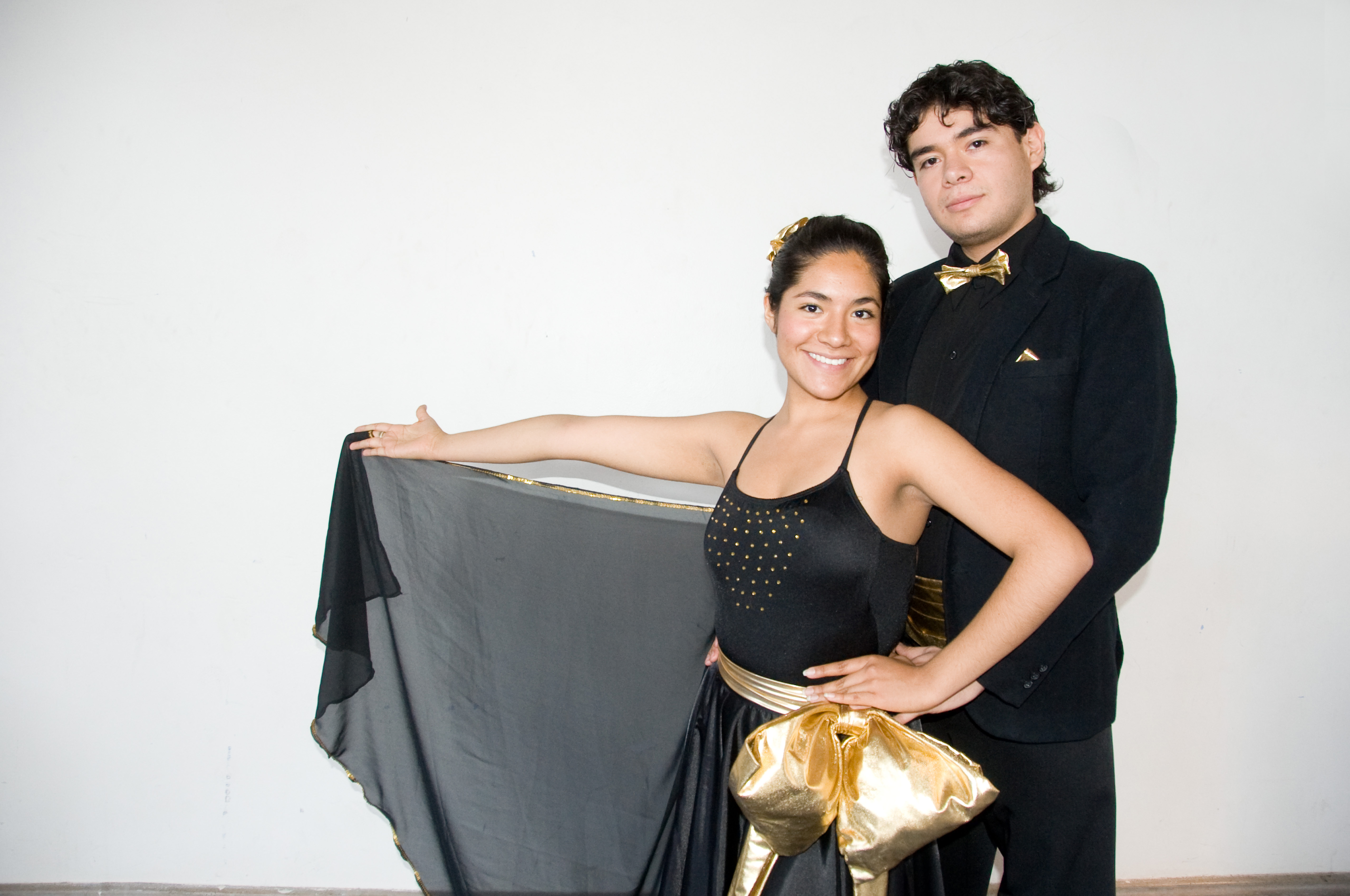
Danzón dancers from Monterrey Institute of Technology and Higher Education, Mexico City

The danzón developed from the habanera, a creolized Cuban dance form. By 1879, the year Las alturas de Simpson composed by Miguel Failde (leader of the Orquesta Faílde) was first performed in Matanzas, danzón had emerged as a distinct genre. Creation of the new danzón form is generally attributed to Faílde. The classical composer Manuel Saumell has also been cited as a key figure in its delineation.

=== Precursors: figure dances ===
The English contradanza was the predecessor of the "habanera", also known as danza criolla. Out of this Creole genre, the Habanera, was born in 1879 another Cuban genre, called danzon, a sequence dance, in which all danced together a set of figures. The first use of the term danzón, which dates from the 1850s, is for just such a dance. Havana's daily paper, El Triunfo, gave a description of this earlier danzón. It was a co-ordinated dance of figures performed by groups of Matanzas blacks. The dancers held the ends of colored ribbons, and carried flower-covered arches. The group twisted and entwined the ribbons to make pleasing patterns. This account can be corroborated by other references, for example, a traveler in Cuba noted in 1854 that black Cubans "do a kind of wreath dance, in which the whole company took part, amid innumerable artistic entanglements and disentanglements". This style of danzón was performed at carnival comparsas by black groups: it is described that way before the late 1870s.

Faílde's first danzóns were created for just such sequence dances. Faílde himself said "In Matanzas at this time there was a kind of square dance for twenty couples who carried arches and flowers. It was really a dance of figures (sequence dance), and its moves were adapted to the tempo of the habanera, which we took over for the danzón."

=== Structure and instruments ===
The form of danzón created by Miguel Faílde in 1879 (Las alturas de Simpson), begins with an introduction (four bars) and paseo (four bars), which are repeated and followed by a 16-bar melody. The introduction and paseo again repeat before a second melody is played. The dancers do not dance during these sections: they choose partners, stroll onto the dance floor, and begin to dance at precisely the same moment: the fourth beat of bar four of the paseo, which has a distinctive percussion pattern that's hard to miss. When the introduction is repeated the dancers stop, chat, flirt, greet their friends, and start again, right on time as the paseo finishes.

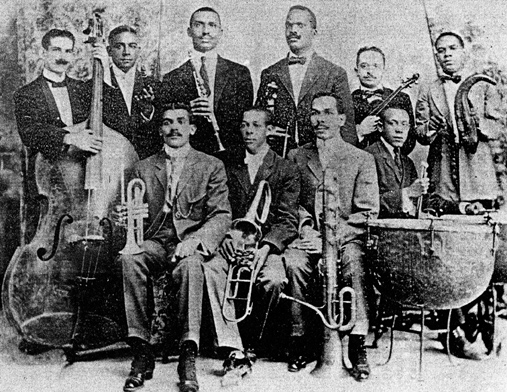
Orquesta Enrique Peña Peña seated left, Barreto (violin) and Urfé (clarinet)

Early danzón was played by groups called orquestas típicas, which were based on wind instruments. They had several brass instruments (cornet, valve trombone, ophicleide), a clarinet or two, a violin or two and tympani (kettle drums). At the beginning of the 20th century, the lighter and somewhat more elegant sound of the charanga emerged (see Early Cuban bands). Initially, they were small orchestra of two violins, a cello, flute, timbales, güiro, and doublebass. Charanga and típicas competed with each other for years, but after 1930 it was clear that the days of the típica were over.

In 1898, a piano was included in a charanga for the first time. In Antonio María Romeu's hands a piano became standard. Its musical flexibility, its ability to influence both melody and rhythm, made it invaluable. In 1926, in his arrangement of Tres lindas cubanas, Romeu incorporated a piano solo for the first time. His was Cuba's top charanga for many years.

=== Initial perception ===
Similar to other dances in the Caribbean and Latin America, the danzón was initially regarded as scandalous, especially when it began to be danced by all classes of society. The slower rhythm of the danzón led to couples dancing closer, with sinuous movements of the hips and a lower centre of gravity. The author of a survey of prostitution in Havana devoted a whole chapter to the iniquities of dancing, and the danzón in particular. Articles in newspapers and periodicals took up the theme:

"Because I love my country, it hurts me to see danzón at gatherings of decent people."
"We recommend banning the danza and danzón because they are vestiges of Africa and should be replaced by essentially European dances such as the quadrille and rigadoon."

Apparently, the danzón, which later became an insipid dance for older couples, was at first danced with "obscene movements" of the hips by young couples in close embrace, with bodies touching, and by couples who might come from different races...

"First we had the danza, then came the danzón... next it will be the rumba, and finally we'll all end up dancing ñáñigo!"

So, behind the concern about music and dance were concerns about sexual licence, and about miscegenation, the mixing of races. As with other similar cases, the criticism was to no avail. The danzón became hugely popular, and was the dominant popular music in Cuba until the advent of the son in the 1920s. At length the Cuban government made Faílde the official inventor of the danzón – but not until 1960, by which time the danzón had become a relic, and its 'child', the chachachá, had taken over.

=== Influence of son ===
In 1910, some 30 years after Faílde's early days, José Urfé added a montuno as a final part of his El Bombín de Barretto. This was a swinging section, consisting of a repeated musical phrase, which introduced something of the son into the danzón (a tactic which was to recur again). Because of the popularity of son in the 1920s and 1930s, Aniceto Díaz in Rompiendo la rutina in 1929 added a vocal part, thereby creating a new genre called the danzonete.

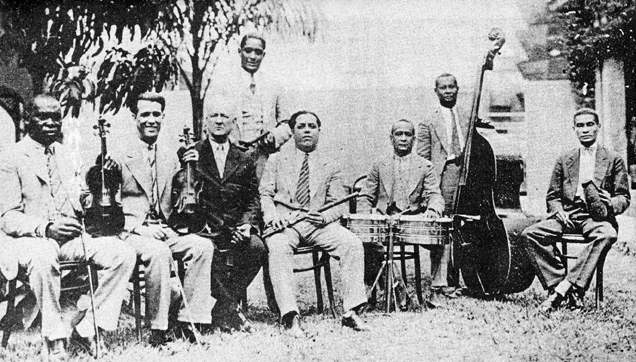
Orquesta Romeu with singer Fernando Collazo, end-1920s

Later development led to more syncopation, which eventually led to the danzón-chá, nuevo ritmo, cha-cha-chá, pachanga and mambo. From the 1940s to the 1960s danzón and its derivatives were highly popular in Cuba, with several truly fine charangas playing most days of the week. Orquesta Aragón kept up an exceptionally high standard for many years, but the danzón itself gradually dropped out, and is now a relic dance.

Danzón has never ceased to influence Cuban musicians, and it is reflected in many popular Cuban music genres, in Cuban Latin jazz, salsa, songo and timba, the latter building upon the charanga orchestration. Groups like Los Van Van and Orquesta Revé developed from charangas. Their make-up and orchestration (by Juan Formell) has been so greatly altered that it is difficult to identify traces of danzón; indeed, their present styles owe more to son than to danzón. The addition of brass instruments such as trombones and trumpets, and conga drums signalled a wider range of music.

== Mexican Danzón ==
Danzon sound clip
Public danzon event on the main plaza in Veracruz, Mexico.

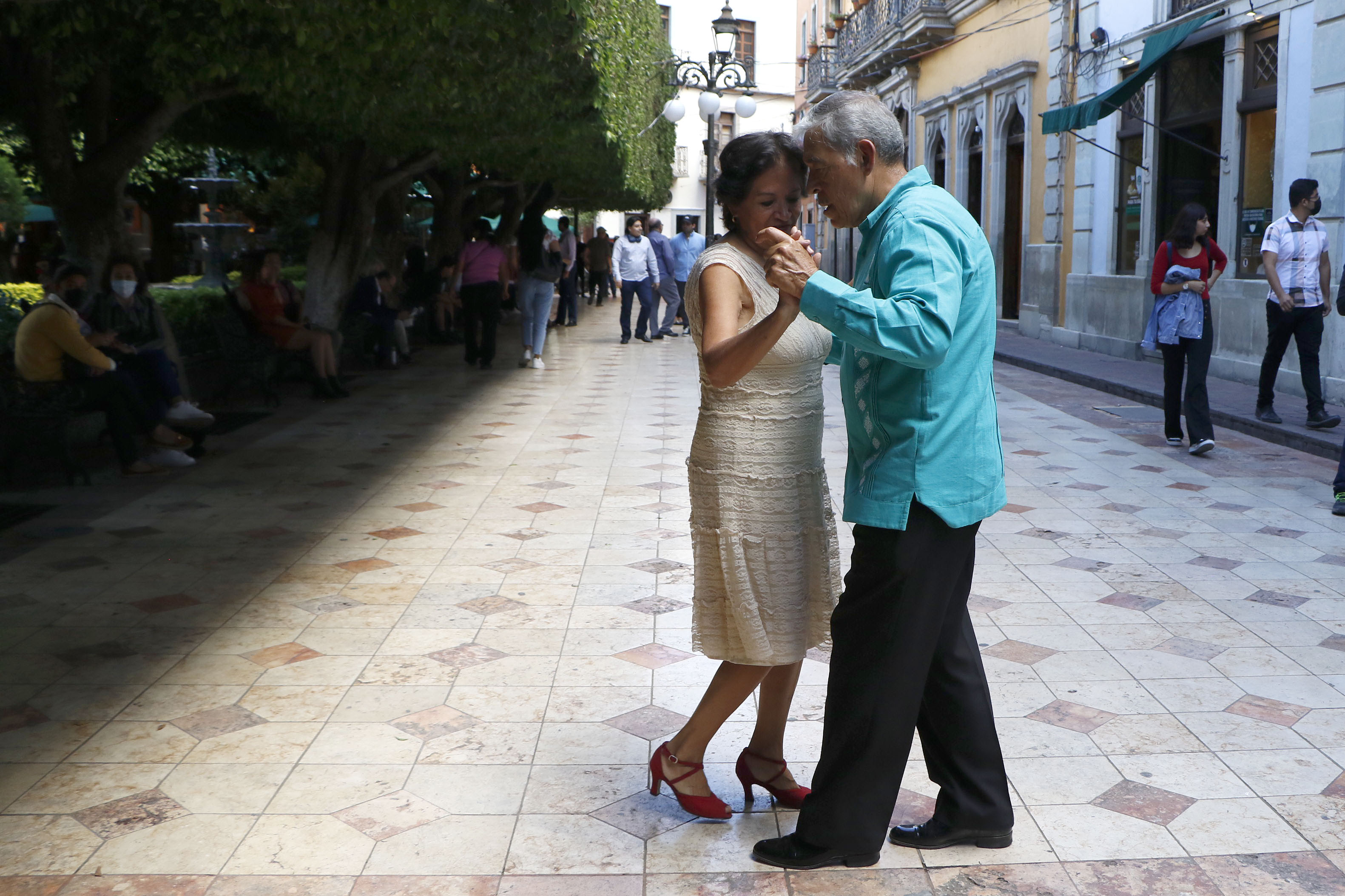
A couple dancing danzón in Guanajuato City, Mexico

Danzón was also very popular in the Gulf Coast state of Veracruz, Mexico, because of the strong Cuban influence in the region. Later on, danzón developed in Mexico City, specially in the famous Salón México; it has survived as a dance longer there than in Cuba. Danzón also flourished in the city of Oaxaca, and many famous danzones were composed by Oaxacan musicians such as the famous Nereidas and Teléfono de larga distancia, both works of Amador Pérez Dimas, from the town of Zaachila, near Oaxaca city.

Today, people still dance danzón in Mexico, particularly in the main plazas of Veracruz, Oaxaca and Mexico City, and in yearly festivals across Mexico. The dance had a second revival in the 1990s, especially among Mexico's senior citizens.

A film called Danzón was released in 1991 directed by María Novaro.

== Concert music ==
Danzón no. 2 by Mexican composer Arturo Márquez (b. 1950) is a popular piece in orchestral concerts.

== Rhythmic structure ==
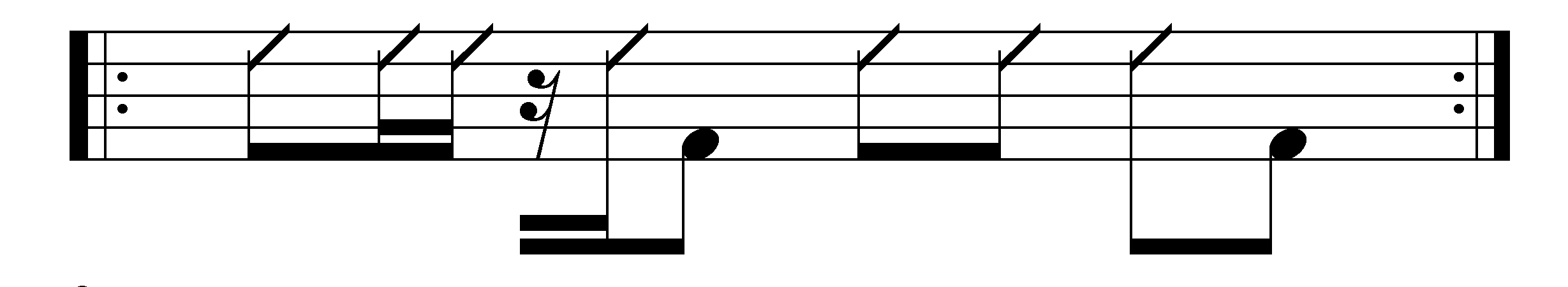
Basic baqueteo timbales part.

The basic timbales part for danzón is called the baqueteo. In the example above, the slashed noteheads indicate muted drum strokes, and the regular noteheads indicate open strokes. The güiro also plays this pattern. The danzón was the first written music to be based on the organizing principle of sub-Saharan African rhythm, known in Cuba as clave.

== Style and form structure ==
Danzón is elegant and virtuoso music, with dance. A danzón, in its original form, was not sung, and did not feature any improvisations, unlike some other Cuban genres. A danzón has the following typical structure:

- An introduction or paseo (A), usually 16 bars.
- The theme or principal melody (B), featuring the flute, thus often referred to as parte de (la) flauta.
- A repeat of the introduction.
- The trio (C), featuring the strings, thus also called parte del violín.
- Ending. This could either be a cliché ending (there are a few standard danzón endings), another repeat of the introduction, or a combination of both.

The classic form is thus ABAC or ABACA. A danzón-chá or danzón-mambo typically add another part (D), a syncopated open vamp in which soloists may sometimes improvise, creating an ABACD or, more common, ABACAD.

== Mambo section ==
In danzón, the mambo section is the final section of an arrangement. It was first devised by Orestes López, who added syncopated motifs taken from the son, together with improvised flute variations. He called this type of danzón ritmo nuevo (new rhythm). Orestes' danzón Mambo was the start of a trend continued by Arcaño y sus Maravillas.

== Selected recordings ==
- Pensamiento – Belisario López
- Lago Azul – Antobal’s Cubans
- Flor De Yurumi – Orquestra Antonio Maria Romeu

== See also ==
- French contredanse
- Guaracha
- La tumba francesa
- Music of Haiti
- Twoubadou
