= Charanga (Cuba) =

Traditional Cuban dance music ensemble

Charanga is a traditional ensemble that plays Cuban dance music. They made Cuban dance music popular in the 1940s and their music consisted of heavily son-influenced material, performed on European instruments such as violin and flute by a Charanga orchestra. (Chomsky 2004, p. 199). The style of music that is most associated with a Charanga is termed 'Danzón', and is an amalgam of both European classical music and African rhythms.

== Origins ==
Scholars agree that Spain and parts of West and Central Africa provided the most crucial influences in the development of Cuban popular and religious music. But in the case of charanga, the contributions of French and Haitian influences cannot be ignored. Charanga began its history in the early nineteenth century when Haitians, both African and French, escaped the island's revolution. They brought with them a love for the French contredanse, a multi-sectional dance form that evolved into the danzón, the quintessential charanga style. Both were performed by an ensemble called an orquesta típica, a group with brass, woodwinds and timpani that performed outdoors. When the upper classes decided to dance indoors, the instrumentation was radically altered. The new ensemble was called charanga francesa. Although the word francesa literally means "French", it was used in nineteenth-century Cuba more specifically as a name for Haitian Creoles. In the charanga francesa, flutes and strings replaced the brass and woodwinds of the orquesta típica, and a small drum kit called pailas (now called timbales) replaced the booming tympany. While the orquesta típica was raucous in a New Orleans jazz fashion, the charanga francesa produced a light and somewhat effete music. The French influence extends to instrumentation for the modern charanga is based on charanga francesa.

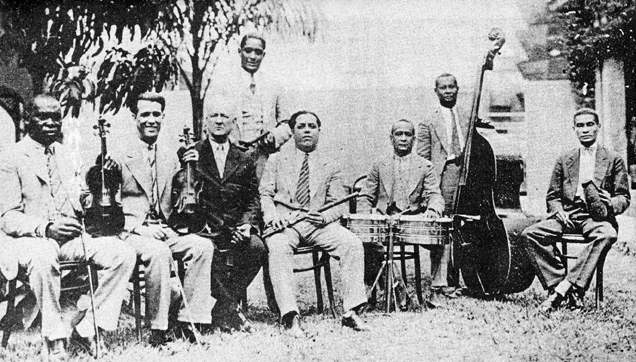
Orquesta de Antonio María Romeu, founded in 1910 (photo is later). It was one of the first charanga francesas.

The first charanga francesa in Cuba was formed at the turn of the twentieth century, possibly by Antonio (Papaíto) Torroella (1856–1934), whose orchestra was active by 1894. These orchestras play lighter versions of the danzón without a brass section and emphasizing flutes, violins, and piano. The percussion was provided by pailas criollas, now known as timbales. The style continued into the 1940s with flautist Antonio Arcaño and his Maravillas (Morales 2003 p13). Charangas are still widespread today, though the danzón is considered old-fashioned.

== See also ==
- Danzón
- Music of Haiti
- French contredanse
- La tumba francesa
- Mambo
- Twoubadou

== Sources ==
- Chomsky, Aviva (2004). The Cuba Reader: History, Culture, Politics. ISBN 0-8223-3197-7.
- Morales, Ed (2003). The Latin Beat: The Rhythms and Roots of Latin Music, from Bossa Nova to Salsa and Beyond. ISBN 0-306-81018-2.

== Genre Representatives ==
- Arcaño y sus Maravillas
- Barroso y La Sensación
- Belisario López
- Charanga 76
- David Calzado y su Charanga Habanera
- Fajardo y Sus Estrellas
- Gonzalo Fernández y Su Súper Típica de Estrellas
- La Charanga Cubana (Los Angeles)
- La Charanga Forever
- Los Van Van de Cuba
- Maravillas del Siglo
- Maravillas de Florida
- Orquesta América
- Orquesta Antonio María Romeu
- Orquesta Aragón
- Orquesta Broadway
- Orquesta Charangoa (Los Angeles)
- Orquesta de Neno González
- Orquesta Duboney
- Orquesta Melodías del 40
- Orquesta Típica Ideal
- Pacheco y Su Charanga
- Pupi y Su Charanga
- Ray Barretto y Su Charanga Moderna
- Ritmo Oriental
