= List of descarga musicians =

A descarga is an improvised jam session consisting of variations on Cuban music themes, sometimes incorporating elements from other Latin American traditions. Since the 1950s, descargas have enjoyed great popularity in the Latin music community, with many musicians and ensembles attaining international fame due to their descarga performances. This list compiles musicians which are widely considered to have become notable, at least in part, due to their descargas.

== List ==
| Name | Instrument | Additional roles | Years active (Note: Time frames include descarga performances and recordings only.) | Scene |
|---|---|---|---|---|
| Johnny Aguiló | percussion | director | 2000s | Miami |
| Rolando Aguiló | trumpet | director | 1950s–1970s | Havana, New York |
| Carlos Arado | trumpet | director | 1950s–1960s | Havana |
| Alfredo "Chocolate" Armenteros | trumpet, flugelhorn | arranger | 1950s–2000s | Havana, New York |
| Armando Armenteros | trumpet | | 1950s–1960s | Havana |
| Guillermo Barreto | timbales, drums | director | 1950s–1990s | Havana |
| Ray Barretto | congas | director | 1960s–2000s | New York |
| Cachaíto | double bass | director | 1950s–2000s | Havana |
| Cachao | double bass | director, arranger | 1950s–2000s | Havana, Miami, New York |
| Cándido Camero | congas | director | 1950s–2010s | Havana, New York |
| Bobby Carcassés | trumpet, vocals | director | 1950s–2000s | Havana |
| Roberto Carcassés | piano | arranger | 1990s–2010s | Havana |
| Yoyo Casteleiro | piano | director, arranger | 1950s–1960s | Havana |
| Félix Chappottín | trumpet | director, arranger | 1950s–1970s | Havana |
| Willie Colón | trombone, vocals | director | 1960s–present | New York |
| Sal Cuevas | double bass | director | 1970s–2010s | New York |
| Richard Egües | flute | director, arranger | 1950s–2000s | Havana |
| Leopoldo "Pucho" Escalante | trombone | director | 1950s–1990s | Havana |
| José Fajardo | flute | director, arranger | 1950s–1960s | Havana, Miami, New York |
| Alfredo de la Fé | violin | director, arranger | 1970s–present | Havana, New York, Bogotá |
| Francisco Fellove | vocals | director | 1950s–2000s | Havana, Mexico City |
| Nelson González | tres | | 1970s–present | New York |
| Julio Gutiérrez | piano | director, arranger | 1950s–1980s | Havana, Miami, New York |
| Generoso Jiménez | trombone | director, arranger | 1950s–1960s, 2000s | Havana, Miami |
| Kako | timbales | | 1960s–1970s | New York |
| Félix “Pupi” Legarreta | violin, flute | director, arranger | 1950s–2000s | Havana, New York |
| Orestes López | piano | | 1950s–1960s | Havana |
| Rolando Lozano | flute | director | 1950s–1970s | Havana, New York, Los Angeles |
| Papo Lucca | piano | arranger | 1960s–2000s | Ponce |
| Juanito Márquez | tres | director | 1950s–1990s | Havana, Madrid, Miami |
| Nicky Marrero | timbales | | 1970s–2000s | New York |
| Osvaldo "Chihuahua" Martínez | güiro | director | 1960s–1980s | New York |
| Chico O'Farrill | trumpet | director, arranger | 1950s–1990s | Havana, New York |
| Johnny Pacheco | flute, güiro | director | 1960s–2000s | New York |
| Charlie Palmieri | piano | director | 1950s–1980s | New York |
| Eddie Palmieri | piano | director | 1960s–present | New York |
| Peruchín | piano | director, arranger | 1950s–1970s | Havana |
| Tito Puente | timbales | director | 1950s–1990s | New York |
| Walfredo de los Reyes | timbales | director | 1950s–2000s | Havana, Miami, San Juan |
| Niño Rivera | tres | director, arranger | 1950s–1980s | Havana |
| Paquito D'Rivera | alto saxophone, clarinet | director, arranger | 1970s–2010s | Havana, New York |
| Charlie Rodríguez | tres | director | 1970s–2000s | New York |
| Alfredo Rodríguez | piano | director | 1970s–2000s | Havana, New York, Paris |
| Barry Rogers | trombone | arranger | 1960s–1990s | New York |
| Arturo Sandoval | trumpet | director, arranger | 1970s–2010s | Havana, Miami |
| Mongo Santamaría | congas, bongos | director | 1950s–1990s | Havana, New York |
| José "Chombo" Silva | tenor saxophone, violin | | 1950s–1990s | Havana, New York |
| Tata Güines | congas | director | 1950s–2000s | Havana |
| Néstor Torres | flute | director | 1970s–present | New York, Miami |
| Alfredo Valdés Jr. | piano | director, arranger | 1950s–2000s | New York, Los Angeles |
| Amadito Valdés | timbales | | 1960s–2010s | Havana |
| Bebo Valdés | piano | director, arranger | 1950s, 1990s–2000s | Havana, Stockholm |
| Carlos "Patato" Valdés | congas | director | 1950s–2000s | Havana, New York |
| Chucho Valdés | piano | director, arranger | 1960s–present | Havana |
| Alejandro "El Negro" Vivar | trumpet | | 1950s–1970s | Havana, Miami, New York |
| Salvador "Bol" Vivar | double bass | | 1950s–1960s | Havana |
