= Cuban Jam Sessions in Miniature =

Studio album by Cachao
- Released: 1957
- Recorded: 1957
- Studios: Panart Studios, Havana
- Genre: Descarga
- Length: 34:34
- Label: Panart

Cachao chronology
Cuban Jam Sessions in Miniature (1957)	Camina Juan Pescao (1958)

Cuban Jam Sessions in Miniature is the debut album by Cuban double bassist Cachao, released in 1957 by Panart. The album is composed of descargas, improvised jam sessions with Cuban themes. It was the fourth installment in Panart's Cuban Jam Session series after Julio Gutiérrez's Cuban Jam Session Vol. 1 and Vol. 2, and Niño Rivera's Vol. 3. Unlike the other installments, Cachao's session comprised short improvisations instead of extended jams. The album sold over a million copies and became "a Latin music milestone". In 2013, it was inducted into the Latin Grammy Hall of Fame and the National Recording Registry.

== Background and recording ==
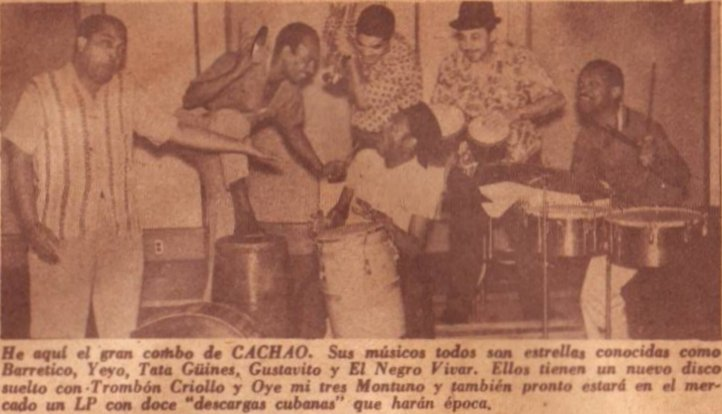
Cachao and his band, as depicted by the March 1961 edition of the Cuban "Show" magazine. Left to right: Cachao (bass), Gustavo Tamayo (güiro), Tata Güines (tumbadora), Alejandro "El Negro" Vivar (trumpet), Rogelio "Yeyo" Iglesias (bongos) and Guillermo Barreto (timbales). This picture was taken during the same photo shoot that yielded the cover of Cuban Jam Sessions in Miniature.

Israel López, better known as Cachao, and his brother Orestes López, nicknamed Macho, were founding members of Cuba's most popular charanga during the late 1930s and 1940s, Arcaño y sus Maravillas, directed by flautist Antonio Arcaño. The repertoire of the group consisted almost exclusively of compositions by the López brothers. Cachao played double bass, whereas Orestes performed on the piano, double bass and cello. They became key innovators of the danzón genre, creating the danzón nuevo ritmo, which led to the mambo in the 1940s and chachacha in the 1950s.

Apart from charangas, Cuban music in the 1940s saw the rise of conjuntos which specialized in son cubano and big bands which played all types of ballroom music from upbeat guarachas to boleros and mambos. With the advent of the filin movement, it became common for artists to improvise extended sessions of boleros and sones, which became known as descargas. In addition, by the early 1950s, jazz was already an important influence on Cuban musicians, and in 1952 Norman Granz recorded pianist Bebo Valdés in an improvised jam session in Havana, based more on Afro-Cuban jazz in the vein of Dizzy Gillespie and Charlie Parker, than son cubano. However, the rise of the descarga genre came in 1956 with Panart's initiative to record jam sessions directed by pianist Julio Gutiérrez. The success of his two albums (Cuban Jam Session Vol. 1 and Vol. 2) led Panart to record a third session directed by tresero Niño Rivera in 1957. The same year, Cachao was called up to record his own sessions. At the time, Las Maravillas were no longer an active band, only recording under Cachao's direction, and they would give their final concert shortly after in 1958. The album was recorded at Panart Studios in Havana for five hours starting at 4 AM after all the musicians had finished their regular nightclub performances.

== Release and promotion ==
The album was released in Cuba and the US by Panart in 1957. The title in Cuba was Descargas cubanas, which was translated in the US as Cuban Jam Sessions in Miniature, with the subtitle "Descargas"; other issues aimed at the Latin American market retained the title Descargas cubanas. The original Cuban issue and its American counterpart were released with different pictures on the cover from the same photo shoot. After its release and despite the turbulent situation in Cuba, the album managed to sell over a million copies. According to Colin Larkin, it "achieved the status of a classic and acted as the launch-pad for Cachao's widespread acclaim". To promote the LP, Panart released four singles containing eight out of the twelve tracks on the album.

Following the nationalization of Panart's assets, the LP was re-issued in 1961 by "Panart Nacionalizada" and shortly after the EGREM logo began to be printed it. During the 1980s, it was re-released in Colombia by Discos Fuentes under the Descargas cubanas title. In 1994, an expanded edition of the album was issued by Caney under the title From Havana to New York, including previously unreleased tracks recorded in New York in the early 1960s. In 1996 the album was issued on CD by EGREM for the Cuban market. In 2004 it was reissued on CD with bonus tracks by the Spanish label VampiSoul.

A remastered CD version was released in November 2018 by Craft Recordings as part of The Complete Cuban Jam Sessions, which also includes the other four jam session LPs originally released by Panart.

== Critical reception ==
Professional ratings
Review scores
Source	Rating
AllMusic	4.5/5 stars

Cuban Jam Sessions in Miniature has been described as a "historic recording" with a "classic rhythm section" and "the true salsa musician's bible on record". Producer Al Santiago (founder of Alegre Records) considered it his "favorite recording of all time", and Larry Harlow called it "a recording that will live forever". Ned Sublette wrote a very favourable review for AllMusic, giving it 4.5 out of 5 stars. It was included in Tom Moon's 1000 Recordings to Hear Before You Die.

The musicianship on the album is universally praised, with reviewers considering the lineup as "Havana's top musicians", "Cuba's best", and "the best soloists and rhythm section of the time. All Hall-of-Famers". Master conguero Frank Malabé praised the performance of Tata Güines, who was very young at the time. According to José Claussell, the album marked "the beginning of a dramatic change in the ideas and practices concerning Afro-Caribbean percussion, especially the conga drum".

== Track listing ==
Side A
No.	Title	Writer(s)	Length
1.	"Trombón criollo"	Gerardo Portillo	3:12
2.	"Controversia de metales"	Israel López	3:04
3.	"Estudio en trompeta"	Israel López	2:24
4.	"Guajeo de saxos"	Emilio Peñalver	2:24
5.	"Oye mi tres montuno"	Andrés Echevarría	2:46
6.	"Malanga amarilla"	Silvio Contreras	3:18

Side B
No.	Title	Writer(s)	Length
1.	"Cógele el golpe"	Andrés Castillo Jr.	2:46
2.	"Pamparana"	Alfredo León	2:38
3.	"Descarga cubana"	Osvaldo Estivill	3:06
4.	"Goza mi trompeta"	Osvaldo Estivill	3:02
5.	"A gozar timbero"	Osvaldo Estivill	3:04
6.	"Sorpresa de flauta"	Osvaldo Estivill	2:51

== Personnel ==
- Cachao – music direction, double bass, piano (track A1)
- Orestes López – piano (tracks A2, A6, B1, B2)
- Alejandro "El Negro" Vivar – trumpet
- Virgilio Vixama – baritone saxophone (track A4)
- Emilio Peñalver – tenor saxophone (track A4)
- Generoso "Tojo" Jiménez – trombone (tracks A1, A2)
- Richard Egües – flute (track B6)
- Niño Rivera – tres (track A5)
- Guillermo Barreto – timbales
- Tata Güines – tumbadora, double bass (track A1)
- Rogelio "Yeyo" Iglesias – bongos
- Gustavo Tamayo – güiro
- Rolito – vocals
- Reyes – vocals

== Singles ==
The following singles were released by Panart to promote the LP:

- Descarga cubana / Goza mi trompeta (Panart 2095)
- A gozar timbero / Sorpresa de flauta (Panart 2140)
- Pamparana / Cógele el golpe (Panart 2212)
- Trombón criollo / Oye mi tres montuno (Panart 2292)
