= Puchito Records =

Cuban independent record label

- Founded: 1954
- Founder: Jesús Gorís (1921–2006)
- Genre: Cuban
- Country of origin: Cuba (until 1961); Miami, Florida (beginning 1961)
- Location: Havana, Cuba (1952–1961); Miami, Florida (1961–present)

Puchito Records was Cuba's second independent record label. (Note: Panart is generally recognized as Cuba's first independent record label; and if candidates for such a claim were narrowed to labels that became large and successful, Panart is most likely the first. However, at least one other label, Star, claims to be the first, by way of its slogan: "primera casa impresora de discos en cuba," which means "first records pressing house in Cuba" (online forum of Steve Hoffman, forums.stevehoffman.tv, post by Daiy89, December 14, 2015, Music Corner: "Cuban Record Labels and Recordings – General Purpose Info and History Thread. What Do You Know?")) It was founded in 1954 during the mambo and cha-cha-chá explosion. Many of its recordings, produced by its founder Jesús Gorís, became instant hits.

== History ==
=== Early career of Puchito's founder ===
The founder, Jesús Gorís (né Jesús Ramon Francisco Gorís Ballas; 12 April 1921 Havana, Cuba – 16 Aug 2006 Miami, Florida) had been a representative of RCA Victor, selling records from a separate counter at his father's hardware store, La Estrella. Eventually, the store became known as Gorís Shop.

Back then, stores were restricted to sell records from just one label. At La Estrella, they were supposed to sell only RCA Records, but Gorís, he would sell you Columbia and Decca recordings he kept hidden under the counter. I guess that secret can now be told.

— Cristóbal Díaz Ayala, 2006

In 1952, Gorís invested in a single, "Guantanamera", composed by Joseíto Fernández, which did well in jukeboxes. Gorís and two partners, Messrs. Alfredo Beltrán and Oliva, originally wanted to launch a series of children's records, so they chose the name Puchito, which, in this context, means "youngest child." In 1954, Gorís and his two partners produced an LP of Olga Guillot singing with The Castro Brothers Orchestra, one of Cuba's first jazz bands (no relation to Fidel Castro). Although Guillot. "Mienteme" ("Lie to Me"), a bolero composed by Chamaco Domínguez (es) (1921–1985), was one of the album's great successes. Puchito went on to produce Guillot on nine more albums, and a few singles, up until 1960. In 1958, Gorís hired pianist René Touzet (1916–2003) as musical director and orchestrator of Guillot's album, Intemidades (MLP-526), which gained reputation as having the most important works of her career, and several that cemented Touzet's reputation as an original composer: "La Noche de Anoche" ("The Night Last Night"), "Será Cuando Tú Quieras," "Estuve Pensando," and "No Te Importe Saber" ("Let Me Love You Tonight"). Guillot and Touzet, though never married, had a daughter together: Olga María Touzet-Guillot (born 1960).

With the support of Benny Moré, Gorís spearheaded the rediscovery of a major sonero artist from the 1920s, Abelardo Barroso, who, back then, had sung with Sexteto Habanero. Gorís curated and, through Puchito, republished old photographs and produced Barroso with the Orquesta Sensación. In early July 1955, Barroso recorded a single, "La hija de Juan Simón" and "En Guantánamo" (Puchito 224, 78 rpm & 45 rpm), his first recording in over fifteen years, and apart from his solitary single in 1939, his first in over a quarter century. Rolando Valdés, founder of Orquesta Sensación, selected the songs for the session, both from Barroso's radio hits of the 1930s. The release became one of the greatest double-sided hits in the history of popular music. It became a Gold Record in 1956.

In 1956, Puchito released 5 more singles featuring Barroso and Orquesta Sensación.

Selected 1956 releases
- Puchito 262 (1956); OCLC 84977883
  Side A: "El Manisero" ("The Peanut Ventor")
  Moisés Simons (w&m)
  OCLC 84977883
  Side B: "Resabroso Cha-Cha-Cha"
  OCLC 81455334
- Puchito 496
  Side A: "Coctel Para Dos"
  Arthur Johnston (w&m)
  Sam Coslow (w&m)
  Side B: "Vuelve Navidad"
Other Puchito hits by Barroso
- "El Panquelero"
- "Tiene sabor"
- "El Guajiro de Cunagua"
- "La Macorina"
- "Con sabor a bombón"
- "Bruca Maniguá"

For the rest of the 1950s, Gorís produced several other highly successful records on the Puchito label. He produced Chapottin y sus Estrellas on with singer Miguelito Cuní (es) (1917–1984), the Orquesta Riverside with singer Tito Gomez (1920–2000) and Roberto Faz (1914–1966) and his conjunto for the label. Puchito manufactured its discs at Panart's factory.

=== Puchito recording locals in Havana ===
At some point, Puchito recorded in the studios of Radio Progreso, built in 1950. Puchito also recorded in a private studio at Calle 10 n.52 in the Vedado district of Havana. And for many years, Puchito recorded at Cuban Plastics & Record Corporation at San Miguel 410, between Campanario and Lealtad in Havana, with the factory outside of the city. San Miguel 410 was the home of Panart, founded and owned by Ramón S. Sabat and his wife, Julia, both also founders of Cuban Plastics and Record Corporation.

=== 1961 Cuban nationalization — National Press of Cuba ===
On May 29, 1961, during the process of enterprise nationalization started by the Revolutionary Government, the assets and management of several record companies were assumed by the Imprenta Nacional de Cuba (INC) (National Press of Cuba), an arts overseer created March 31, 1961. Companies included in the seizure included Puchito and Panart.

Imprenta Nacional de Cuba acted as the only legal Cuban label until 1964.

In 1964, EGREM (Empresa de Grabaciones y Ediciones Musicales) became Cuba's national label. EGREM operated several imprints including Areito (for recordings made in the former Panart studios in Havana), Palma (for international distribution) and Siboney (for recordings made in Santiago de Cuba).

=== Puchito Record Mfg. Co. Inc. in Florida ===
In 1961, two years after the end of the Cuban Revolution, Gorís went into exile, immigrating to Miami, Florida, and was lawfully admitted in the United States for permanent residence on October 20, 1962. He began working at a 7-Eleven, then became a top salesman for Equitable Life Insurance in Miami. While working in insurance, Gorís, with a partner, Giuseppe Pucci Storniolo (1929–1993), launched Puchito Record Mfg. Co. Inc. in 1963 as a Florida entity, initially located at 480 East 28 Street, Hialeah. Puchito Record Mfg. Co. produced the recordings that Gorís brought with him from Cuba. After a period of time, the new Puchito released those recordings on its newly created budget label, Adria. The new Puchito also started to distribute its newly created Krystal label.

Gorís and his wife, Georgina Rita Gorís (1927–2012), became naturalized United States citizens on April 12, 1968. Jesús Gorís married Georgina around 1945, and remained married to her for the rest of his life.

The company remained active until 1971. It somehow operated afterwards from the US, but seemed to have continued also in Cuba for a while after the revolution.

Puchito Mfg. Co. Inc. (1969)

President & Head of A&R: Jesús Gorís
Vice President: Giuseppe Pucci Storniolo (1929–1993)
Labels: Puchito, Adria, Dardo Recordings, J. & G. Recordings

J. & G. Recordings was a United States trademark of Puchito Record Mfg. Co. Inc., based in Hialeah, Florida. The trademark was active ten years, from April 25, 1967, to April 25, 1977.

=== Armada and Rodriguez of Miami, Inc. ===
José Armada Sr. and Vicente Rodríguez, who had been in the record business together in Cuba, remain together when they arrived in New York in 1964. They recorded and distributed Puchito Records and set up racks in New York and New Jersey.

Fellow Cubans brought them to Miami in 1968, where they purchased the bankrupt Puchito label at an auction, picked up some other labels, and started a distributing business. In 1972 they opened a manufacturing plant —Armada and Rodriguez of Florida, Inc.— where they pressed LP's and 45's for their own labels: Gema Records, Velvet Records Inc., Continental Records, Aro Records, Funny Records, Regio Records, and Suave Records, and a number of custom labels. Their labels, Aro, Funny, Regio, and Suave are distributed all over the U.S. and Puerto Rico and for the most part are licensed works from Latin America.

But, they also produced and recorded local artists, including The Antiques, Alexis Fari, Miriam (aka Myriam) and the Sons of Paraguay. Armada & Rodriquez distributed Gema throughout the U.S., and they owned their own distributing organization in New York and Antilla.

They sold only to distributors, not to retail stores, but also owned a distributing company that sold to retail stores and serviced their racks.

== Re-release labels ==
- Southeastern Records, Hialeah, Florida (South-Eastern Records Manufacturing Corporation)
  Mateo San Martin, Opa Locka, Florida
  Roberto Rodreguez, Opa Locka, Florida
- A company called "Adria" distributed for "Florida Puchito Records MFG. Co. Inc." see OCLC 836877790
- Big World Distributors Inc. (Miami)
- WCD (World Circuit Distributors)
- Antilla Records, Miami
  Antilla Record Distributors, Inc., was a company owned and operated by José Armada. Under the label, records were manufactured and distributed by Armada & Rodriguez of Florida, Inc., named after founders and co-presidents, José Armada, Sr., and Vicente Rodríguez of Miami.
  "Distributed by Armada & Rodriguez of Florida"
  "Manufactured and distributed by Armada & Rodriguez of Florida"
  José Armada, Sr., owned the Caribbean Records Mfg., Corp.
  Mangu Records and Parcha were trademarks owned jointly, or a separate times, by:
  1. Platano Records, Inc, Miami, FL (José Armada)
  2. Antilla Record Distributors, Inc, New York, NY (José Armada)

== Subsidiaries, distributors, and successors ==
Sometime around 1955, Puchito Records became a subsidiary of Montilla Records, which was owned by Fernando Montilla (né Fernando José Montilla Ambrosiani; 1915–2014) and, from 1955 to 1959, managed by Harry Sultan (1904–1971), who, from about 1931 to about 1967, was owner of Sultan's Record Shop at 26, then 38 East 23rd Street, in the Flatiron District of Manhattan, New York. In 1956, Montilla Records, set-up in a distributorship in his shop on 23rd Street to expand distribution of Puchito Records coast-to-coast.

Armada & Rodriguez of Florida, Inc., Miami, Florida (founded July 22, 1968 — dissolved September 24, 1999)

- Platano Records, Inc., Miami, Florida

Personnel

- José Armada
- Juan B. Fernandez
- Elvira Treyne
- José Armanda

Antilla Records, Inc., Bronx, New York (founded on October 31, 1985, as a New York entity, and dissolved June 24, 1992)

Not to be confused with the above Antilla Records, another firm named Antilla Records was founded February 26, 1999, as a New York entity. It was renamed Sabor Records, Inc., on June 25, 1999, and dissolved March 2, 2004.

Toreador Records were manufactured in the U.S.

Talía Industria Manufacturera De Disco S.A., based in Lima, produced, manufactured, and distributed Puchito Records.

Dardo Recording Corp. (Dardo Recordings), based in Hialeah, Florida, manufactured and distributed Puchito Records under the Dardo Recordings label.

== Selected Puchito artists and groups ==
Individual artists

- Antonio Aguilar (1919–2007), singer, songwriter, actor
- Paulina Álvarez (1912–1965), singer of danzonetes
- Ataulfo Alves (pt) (1909–1969), guitarist, composer, singer
- Cándido Antomattei, jazz singer, guitarist
- Abelardo Barroso (1905–1972), career was revived by Jesús Gorís
- Cachao (1918–2008), double bassist, composer
- Julio Cueva (1897–1995), bandleader, trumpeter
- Negrito Chapuseaux (de) (1911–1986), singer, composer
- Miguelito Cuní (es) (1917–1984), singer
- Damirón (es) (1908-1992), pianist, composer
- Wallace Davenport (1925–2004), sideman, trumpeter
- José Fajardo (1919–2001), charanga bandleader, flutist
- Roberto Faz (1914–1966), singer
- Joseíto Fernández (1908–1979)
- Leopoldo Fernández (1904–1985), comedian
- Rosita Fornés (born 1923), singer
- Fredesvinda García, aka "Freddy" (1935–1961), sometimes referred to as the 300-pound Ella Fitzgerald, recorded her only album with Puchito before her untimely death
- Amparo Garrido (es)
- Tito Gómez (1920–2000), singer
- Zoila Gómez (born 1927), singer, comedian, show writer
- Celina González (1929–2015), singer
- Celio González (1924–2004), singer
- Cesar Gonzmart (1920–1992), violinist, entertainer
- Al Grey (1925–2000), jazz trombonist
- Tata Güines (1931–2008), percussionist
- Olga Guillot (1922–2010), vocalist who made a recording that became one of luckiest breaks for Puchito Records
- Rufus "Speedy" Jones (1936–1900), sideman, drummer
- Enrique Jorrín (1926–1987), violinist, sideman violinist, composer, music director
- Ernesto Lecuona (1895–1963), composer, pianist
- Pío Leyva (1917–2006), singer
- Lucho Macedo (es) (born 1930)
- Anibal de Mar (1908-1980), comedian
- Cheo Marquetti (1909-1967), singer
- Manolo Álvarez Mera (br) (1923–1986), bel canto tenor
- Rita Montaner (1900–1958), singer
- Bobby Plater (1914–1982), sideman, jazz saxophonist
- Rodrigo Prats (1909–1980), composer, arranger, pianist, violinist
- Antonio María Romeu (1876–1955)
- Toña la Negra (1912–1982)
- Marta Pérez (1924–2009), mezzo-soprano
- Carlos Puebla (1917–1989), singer, guitarist, composer
- Cheo Belén Puig (br) (1908–1971), pianist, composer, music director
- Félix Reina (es) (1921–1998), composer, arranger, and bandleader
- Arsenio Rodríguez (1911–1970), musician, composer, bandleader
- Wyatt Ruther, jazz bassist, sideman
- Bola Sete (1923–1987), jazz guitarist
- Senén Suárez (es) (1922–1913), composer, guitarist, arranger, writer
- René Touzet (1916–2003), orchestra director
- Miguelito Valdés (1912–1978), singer
- Rolando Valdés, vocalist orchestra leader (first signed with Puchito in 1953)
- María Teresa Vera (1895–1965), singer, guitarist, composer

Groups

- Trío Calaveras
- Chappottín y sus Estrellas
- Conjunto Casino (es)
- Orquesta Estrellas Cubanas

Félix Reina (es) (1921–1998), director

- Sexteto Habanero
- Grupo Guaguancó Matancero, later known as Los Muñequitos de Matanzas
- Orquesta Melodías Del 40
- Papín y sus Rumberos (aka Los Papines) (4 brothers)

Alfredo Abreu (died 2001) (drums)
Ricardo Abreu ("Papín") (died 2009) (director)
Jesús Abreu
Luis Abrea

- Orquesta Riverside

Adolfo Guzmán (1920-1976), director

- Orquesta Casino de la Playa
- Orquesta Sensación
- Trío Servando Díaz (es)
- Septeto Nacional

Ignacio Piñeiro (1888–1969), leader

== Other selected early Cuban independent record labels ==
- Panart, founded in 1943 by Ramón S. Sabat, musician and engineer, was Cuba's first independent label
- Cuban Plastic and Record Corporation, founded in 1943 by the Cuban engineer Ramón S. Sabat
- Kubaney was founded in 1955 by Alfonso "Puchi" Vásquez; Emusica purchased the Kubaney back catalog in 2005, and reissued many of its hits; in 2009, Kubaney's assets were bought by the investment firm, Signal Equity Partners, operating under the name Codigo Group. They also bought 14 other Latin catalogs from the same era, including West Side Latino and Fania.
- Montilla was founded in 1955 by Fernándo J. Montilla (1915–2014), who, in 1965, moved to Puerto Rico; then in 1980, he moved to Miami
- Gema was founded in 1957 by Guillermo Álvarez Guedes (1927–2013), his brother, Rafael Álvarez Guedes (1929–1966), and Ernesto Duarte Brito (es) (1922–1988); after the Cuban Revolution, Gema moved to Puerto Rico
- Maype was founded in 1959 by Arturo Machado Díaz
- Meca was founded in 1959 by Juan Manuel Tabares and Fernando Senra
- Suaritos
- Modiner
- Rosell Record
- Plátano Records Corporation, a Florida entity founded in 1992
- Southern Records — Post-Cuban Revolution U.S. distributor
- Mate Records
- Armada & Rodriguez of Miami, Inc. — Post-Cuban Revolution U.S. distributor
- Velvet Records Inc., an inactive Florida entity, founded in 1965 and dissolved in 1985

Owned by the Page brothers: Roberto Page, President; Jose Page, Vice President (Note: Velvet Records was founded in Venezuela by Jose Page, who, as of 1973, still lived there and owned Velvet of Venezuela. His brother, Roberto Page, opened the Miami branch in 1965, but lived in Puerto Rico where he directed all aspects of Velvet in the U.S. Miami was considered the main office and there were distributors in New York, Chicago, Los Angeles, Philadelphia, and Connecticut. Tony Moreno was the manager of the Miami office and, in 1973, stated that when Velvet came to the U.S. in 1965, the major artist was Felipe Pirela (1941–1972). ("Miami's Latin Music Community: Flourishing, Expanding, Optimistic," Billboard, March 23, 1973, pg. F-15))

- Kristal Records (re-issues of Velvet Records?)
- Aro Records
- Continental Records
- Belter Records
- Regal Records
- Ser Records
- Audio Latino Records

Record Distributors

- Discuba Records, founded in 1959 and owned by RCA Victor, and headed by Jesús Humara; lasted until 1962
- Musart Records, Mexican
- Peerless Records, Mexican
- Eco Records
- Seida Records
- Codiscos, Colombian
- RCA Records of Puerto Rico
- Royal Records (Jaime Monserrat)

== See also ==
- List of record labels
- Artists photos, Discos Puchito, Digital Collections, University of Miami Libraries

Carlos Barba, Cuban singer
Carlos Díaz (1930–2002), Cuban singer
Manolo Álvarez Mera (br), Cuban tenor
María Luisa Chorens (1915–1999), Cuban singer, sister of Olga Chorens
Mercy Cantillo, Cuban singer
Rosita Fornés
