= Jam Session with Feeling =

Studio album by Cachao
- Released: 1962
- Recorded: 1958
- Studio: Havana, Cuba
- Genre: Descarga, danzón, bolero
- Length: 40:23
- Label: Maype

Cachao chronology
El gran Cachao (1959)	Jam Session with Feeling (1962)	Descarga (1963)

Jam Session with Feeling is the second descarga album recorded by Cuban bassist Cachao. Following the recording and release of Cuban Jam Sessions in Miniature, which received critical and commercial acclaim, Cachao assembled a similar roster of musicians to record Jam Session with Feeling in Havana in 1958. The album was meant to be released by Maype, but due to the political events of the time, it was not released until 1962, in the United States, once Maype had relocated there. The title of the album is a reference to filin (feeling), the 1940s movement in which forms such as the bolero were used as a basis for descargas (improvised jam sessions).

== Recording ==
The album focuses on improvised arrangements of Afro-Cuban standards: danzones, boleros and sones. This is unlike Cuban Jam Sessions in Miniature, where the compositions were novel and not adscribable to any genre besides the unspecific "descarga". On Jam Session with Feeling, many of the songs are decades-old such as Eusebio Delfín's bolero "¿Y tú qué has hecho?" (1922), Ernesto Lecuona's canción "Siboney" (1929), Moisés Simons' son-pregón "El manisero" (1930), and Arsenio Rodríguez' son "A buscar camarón" (1943). Also included is "(Camina) Juan Pescao", one of Orestes López most famous danzones which was the title track to the Spanish reissue of Cachao's 1958 Con el ritmo de Cachao, a straight-ahead danzón album also recorded in 1958.

The album features Cachao's brother, Orestes López on piano and Niño Rivera on electric tres, both of whom had previously performed as guests on Cuban Jam Sessions in Miniature. The wind section is formed by trombonist Generoso "Tojo" Jiménez and trumpeters Armandito Armenteros (cousin of Alfredo "Chocolate" Armenteros) and Alejandro "El Negro" Vivar. The album features both Ricardo Abreu (leader of Los Papines) and Tata Güines on tumbadora, the latter doubling on the drums (trap set).

== Release ==
Following the relocation of Maype to Miami, the album was originally released as a 12" vinyl record in 1962 with the catalog number US-122. In 1992 it was released on cassette (USC-122) and CD (CD-122).

Jam Session with Feeling was followed by Descarga (US-168), also recorded for Maype with a similar lineup.

== Track listing ==
Side A
No.	Title	Writer(s)	Length
1.	"Siboney"	Ernesto Lecuona	4:13
2.	"Avance Juvenil"	Orestes López	3:17
3.	"Marta"	Moisés Simons	2:42
4.	"La floresta"	Orestes López	2:48
5.	"El niño toca el tres"	Israel López	2:53
6.	"La bayamesa"	Sindo Garay	3:01

Side B
No.	Title	Writer(s)	Length
1.	"El manisero"	Moisés Simons	3:07
2.	"Juan Pescao"	Orestes López	2:57
3.	"A buscar camarones"	Arsenio Rodríguez	3:37
4.	"Descarga general"	Orestes López	3:43
5.	"¿Y tú qué has hecho?"	Eusebio Delfín	4:50
6.	"Redención"	Orestes López	3:11

== Personnel ==
- Cachao – music direction, double bass
- Orestes López – piano
- Alejandro "El Negro" Vivar – trumpet
- Armando Armenteros – trumpet
- Generoso "Tojo" Jiménez – trombone
- Niño Rivera – electric tres
- Ricardo "Papín" Abreu – tumbadora
- Tata Güines – tumbadora, drums
- Rogelio "Yeyo" Iglesias – bongos
- Gustavo Tamayo – güiro
