= Descarga =

Cuban improvised jam session

- Stylistic origins: Son cubano, filin, rumba, mambo
- Cultural origins: Havana music scene (mid-1950s)
- Typical instruments: Piano, double bass, percussion section, horn section, tres, flute, violin
- Derivative forms: Salsa dura

Regional scenes
- Havana and New York City

Other topics
- Music of Cuba - Jam session

A descarga (literally discharge in Spanish) is an improvised jam session consisting of variations on Cuban music themes, primarily son montuno, but also guajira, bolero, guaracha and rumba. The genre is strongly influenced by jazz and it was developed in Havana during the 1950s. Important figures in the emergence of the genre were Cachao, Julio Gutiérrez, Bebo Valdés, Peruchín and Niño Rivera in Cuba, and Tito Puente, Machito and Mario Bauzá in New York. Originally, descargas were promoted by record companies such as Panart, Maype and Gema under the label Cuban jam sessions. From the 1960s, the descarga format was usually adapted by large salsa ensembles, most notably the Fania All-Stars.

== History ==
=== Origins: son, filin and jazz ===
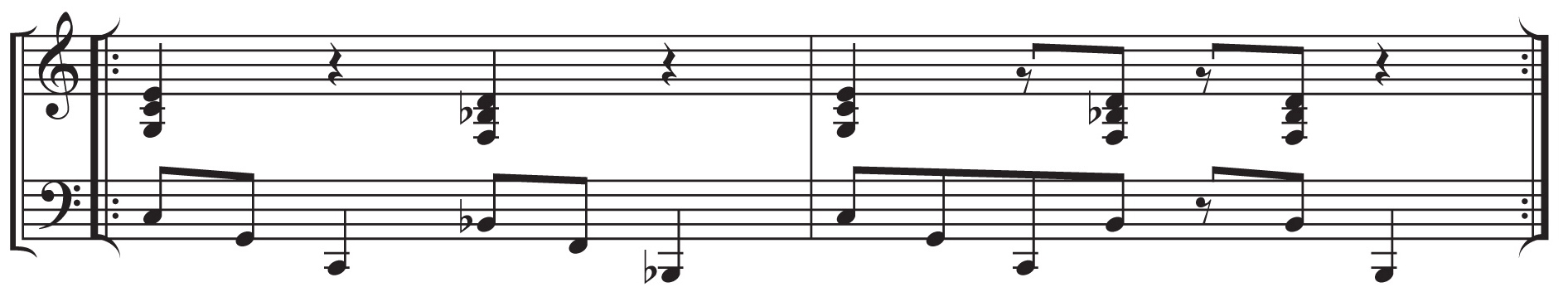
Piano guajeo in the Mario Bauzá composition "Tangá". This tune is considered the first Afro-Cuban jazz piece. As such, the 1949 recording of this song by Machito and his Afro-Cubans was an important factor in the development of the descarga format. In fact, pieces such as "Tangá" were commonly performed in jam sessions.

During the 1940s, the term descarga was commonly used in the music scenes of Cuba to refer to performances of jazz-influenced boleros in an improvised manner. This was part of the so-called filin (feeling) movement spearheaded by artists such as José Antonio Méndez, César Portillo de la Luz, and Luis Yánez. This style was inherited by musicians such as Bebo Valdés and Frank Emilio Flynn who explored the combination of jazz and Cuban forms into the 1950s. In particular, Bebo's 1952 session with producer Norman Granz in Havana, credited to Andre's All Stars, is often cited as a milestone in the development of Cuban jazz, and by extension, descarga. At this time, however, the term descarga began to be used in a different way to describe jam sessions based on the son montuno and other Afro-Cuban rhythms. The incipient mambo and Afro-Cuban jazz scene found in New York during the 1940s was also a catalyst of the development of descargas, with artists such as Machito, Dizzy Gillespie, Charlie Parker and Tito Puente performing extended jams with Afro-Cuban motifs.

=== 1950s: the Panart sessions ===
We showed up at the Panart studios around 2 or 3 a.m., after finishing our respective gigs in various nightclubs. The Galician owner of Panart Records brought about forty cognac bottles and fifty rum bottles. That's how Julio Gutiérrez's first descarga volume was completed. It was a true descarga: There was no written music involved.

— Walfredo de los Reyes

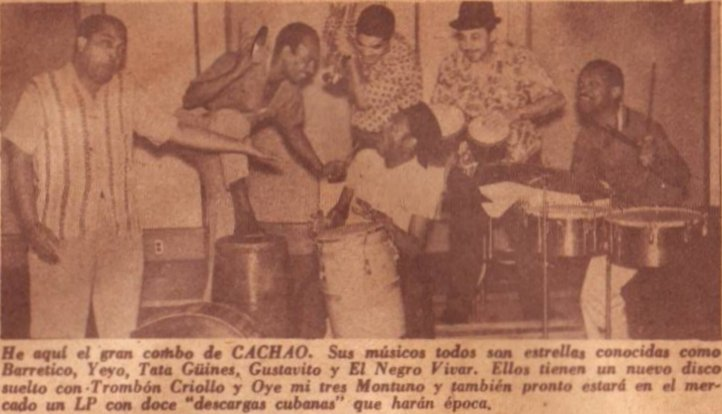
Cachao and his band, as depicted on the March 1961 edition of the Cuban "Show" magazine. Left to right: Cachao (bass), Gustavo Tamayo (güiro), Tata Güines (tumbadora), Alejandro "El Negro" Vivar (trumpet), Rogelio "Yeyo" Iglesias (bongos) and Guillermo Barreto (timbales). This picture was taken during the same photo shoot that yielded the cover of Cuban Jam Sessions in Miniature.

The first series of commercially successful descarga jam sessions were recorded mostly between 1956 and 1958 at the Panart studios in Havana. The Panart descarga sessions were released in three volumes under the title Cuban Jam Session; they would sell over a million copies. Volumes I (1956, yellow cover) and II (1957, blue cover) were recorded under the direction of Julio Gutiérrez with Peruchín on piano. The sessions were recorded by engineer Fernando Blanco in Havana and then sent for editing to New York. According to the original liner notes of Volume I, the studio doors were opened at 10:30 pm and the recordings took place throughout the night. The jams in Volume I revolve around canción, mambo, chachachá and conga themes; the longest track, "Opus for Dancing", lasts 10 minutes. Volume II kicks off with "Descarga caliente", a 17-minute montuno jam, (Note: Singer Francisco Fellove claimed this song, along with "Cimarrón" on Vol. 1, was recorded in 1952, which would make it the first recorded descarga, but the official records show all tracks were recorded in 1956.) while side B features a rumba, a chachachá and a Santería ritual performance. Volume III (1958, red cover) was directed by tresero Niño Rivera and it comprises three montuno tracks combined with swing, guajira and chachachá, plus a guaguancó-comparsa. The only musicians to participate in all three sessions were Alejandro "El Negro" Vivar (trumpet), Emilio Peñalver (tenor saxophone) and Salvador "Bol" Vivar (double bass). Another session entitled Cuban Jam Session with Fajardo took place under the direction of flautist José Fajardo in 1957, but only four tracks could be recorded. The album was finished in Miami in 1964. It was the first descarga album in the charanga format and it features jazz-inspired mambos, chachachás, guajiras and montunos.

In 1957, Cachao recorded in the Panart studios his Cuban Jam Sessions in Miniature, short descargas which contrasted with the extended jams in the previous Cuban Jam Session LPs. The album, credited to "Cachao y su ritmo caliente" (Cachao and his hot rhythm), has been described as a "historic recording" with a "classic rhythm section" and "the true salsa musician's bible on record". The same year, Chico O'Farrill directed two descargas, namely "Descarga Número 1" and "Descarga Número 2" with his all-star group, All Stars Cubano, featuring Cachao on bass. O'Farrill's recordings were released by Gema as a single and later included in the multi-artist LP Los mejores músicos de Cuba (1959). Cachao continued to record descarga sessions as a leader between 1958 and 1960: Jam Session with Feeling (Maype), Descarga (Maype), Cuban Music in Jam Session (Bonita) and Descargas con el ritmo de Cachao (Modiner). At the same time, Cachao recorded sessions of traditional danzones for Ernesto Duarte's label Producciones Duarte, yielding two albums that were distributed by Kubaney: Con el ritmo de Cachao (reissued as Camina Juan Pescao) and El gran Cachao (reissued as Cachao y su Típica Vol. 2), featuring former members of Arcaño y sus Maravillas. Nonetheless, later in his career he would record many of these danzones ("Avance Juvenil", "Ahora sí", etc.) in an extended, descarga-like format.

Simultaneously with the Panart recordings from Havana, Tito Puente recorded a full descarga album in 1956, Puente in Percussion. It is a percussion-heavy set of descargas featuring Mongo Santamaría, Willie Bobo and Carlos "Patato" Valdés. Like Cuban Jam Session Vol I, the album features variations on mambo themes, although the focus of Tito's recordings is the percussion section, lacking a pianist to play the guajeos. The album featured guest bassist Bobby "Big Daddy" Rodríguez to play tumbaos on a couple of tracks. In 1957, Puente recorded his critically acclaimed Top Percussion, the follow-up to Puente in Percussion. It features Mongo Santamaría, Willie Bobo, Francisco Aguabella and Julito Collazo. The album closer is a 7-minute descarga-jazz with guest Doc Severinsen on lead trumpet.

In 1958, Walfredo de los Reyes, the timbalero in Cuban Jam Session Vols I and II, recorded Sabor cubano with pianist Yoyo Casteleiro, a horn section, and singers Kiko Rodríguez and Martha Rams. The album included Chico O'Farrill's "Descarga", Mario Bauzá's "Mambo Inn" and a guaracha titled "Cuban Jam Session" credited to Rafael Hernández.

=== 1960s: from Havana to New York ===
In 1960, Walfredo de los Reyes recorded his second descarga LP as a leader, Cuban Jazz. Unlike his previous album, this one featured a heavy percussion section courtesy of Los Papines. In addition, Cachao performed on bass. That same year, trumpeter Rolando Aguiló released two albums entitled Cuban Jam Session on Maype. Although his style has been described as leaning towards "soft mambo" and cha-cha-cha, his sessions have been praised due to Juanito Márquez's performance on electric guitar, cited by some critics as a "mystery guitarist" due to the absence of credits on the LP. Around the same time, another LP by the title of Cuban Jam Session was recorded by an ensemble directed by trumpeter Carlos Arado, who like Aguiló had been a member of Orquesta Hermanos Castro, for the label Sirena. Cachao left Cuba in 1962, staying in Madrid for a year before moving to New York, where he joined Tito Rodríguez's orchestra. Cachao's influence is notable in jams such as "Descarga Cachao" and "Descarga Malanga". Around the same time, Cachao recorded a series of descarga-like tunes with Joe Cain's orchestra, which featured a mix of American and Cuban musicians. The resulting album, Latin Explosion, was re-released on CD together with Cuban Jam Sessions in Miniature under the title From Havana to New York.

During the early 1960s, the descarga genre was revitalized in New York by the Alegre All-Stars, an ensemble featuring the most successful artists in the Alegre Records roster. The albums were produced by Al Santiago, who chose Charlie Palmieri as music director, and they would have a major influence on the development of salsa, launching the careers of artists such as Johnny Pacheco, Cheo Feliciano and Barry Rogers. Palmieri had already recorded one descarga tune, "Pacheco's Descarga", for the debut album of his charanga La Duboney, which featured Pacheco on flute. Pacheco later directed his own descarga session for his 1965 album Pacheco, His Flute and Latin Jam. Also in 1965, Alegre released Puerto Rican All-Stars featuring Kako, a jam-session recorded in February 1963 and led by prolific timbalero Francisco Ángel Bastar "Kako" which featured Rafael Ithier and Roberto Roena among others. Soon, Alegre's biggest competitor, Tico, launched its own "house band", the Tico All-Stars, playing the same style of "Nuyorican" descargas. Meanwhile, the Alegre All-Stars project was continued by Al Santiago under different names, namely Cesta All-Stars and Salsa All-Stars. In 1968, Jerry Masucci and Johnny Pacheco, the owners of New York's leading salsa label, Fania Records, decided to start another project in the vein of the Alegre All-Stars but with a different approach: the music would now revolve around large-ensemble salsa played live instead of the 1950s Panart studio descarga style. The band, the Fania All-Stars, debuted in 1968 at the Red Garter in Greenwich Village with a lineup that included Ray Barretto, Joe Bataan, Willie Colón, Bobby Valentín and Larry Harlow among others, plus guests Eddie Palmieri, Tito Puente and Richie Ray. The concert was recorded and divided into two LPs, Live at the Red Garter Volumes I and II, which were moderately successful.

=== 1970s: the peak of salsa dura ===
In 1970, Eddie Palmieri released Superimposition, an LP with descargas such as "Chocolate Ice Cream" and "17.1", which featured Alfredo "Chocolate" Armenteros on trumpet. Armenteros would later join Grupo Folklórico y Experimental Nuevayorquino, an ensemble founded by musicologist and producer René López. The group played extended descargas with a modern salsa sound.

On August 26, 1971, the Fania All-Stars were reformed with a new lineup to perform at the Cheetah. The concert was recorded and filmed, yielding a documentary, Our Latin Thing, and three albums, Live at the Cheetah, Volumes I and II and the soundtrack to Our Latin Thing. The performances are all in a salsa dura style and in a descarga format, which is acknowledged in the 9-minute-long "Descarga Fania", written by Ray Barretto and arranged by Barretto and pianist Louie Cruz. The concert is often cited as one of the most crucial moments in the history of salsa, highlighting the importance of the descarga format in the success of the genre during the 1970s.

In 1977, Cachao was brought to a studio by musicologist René López to record two new albums for the Salsoul label: Cachao y su Descarga 77 and Dos. Half of the recorded tracks were danzones composed by Cachao during his early career, whereas the other half consisted of Afro-Cuban descargas, as in the later stages of Cachao's career. The recording sessions featured prestigious musicians including "first generation" descarga artists such as Alejandro "El Negro" Vivar, Alfredo "Chocolate" Armenteros, Carlos "Patato" Valdés and Julito Collazo, as well as members of the "second generation" of descarga and salsa musicians such as Barry Rogers, Nelson González and Andy González.

On September 18, 1977, at the Monterey Jazz Festival, Tito Puente in collaboration with vibraphonist Cal Tjader introduced descarga for the first time to the mainstream jazz audience with his closing 10-minute rendition of the classic son "Pare cochero" (written by Marcelino Guerra).

Starting in 1979, the Cuban all-star ensemble Estrellas de Areito directed by Juan Pablo Torres released five albums consisting exclusively of descargas. A compilation of these recordings entitled Los héroes was later reissued by World Circuit in 1999 to critical acclaim.

=== 1980s to present: revival and critical acclaim ===
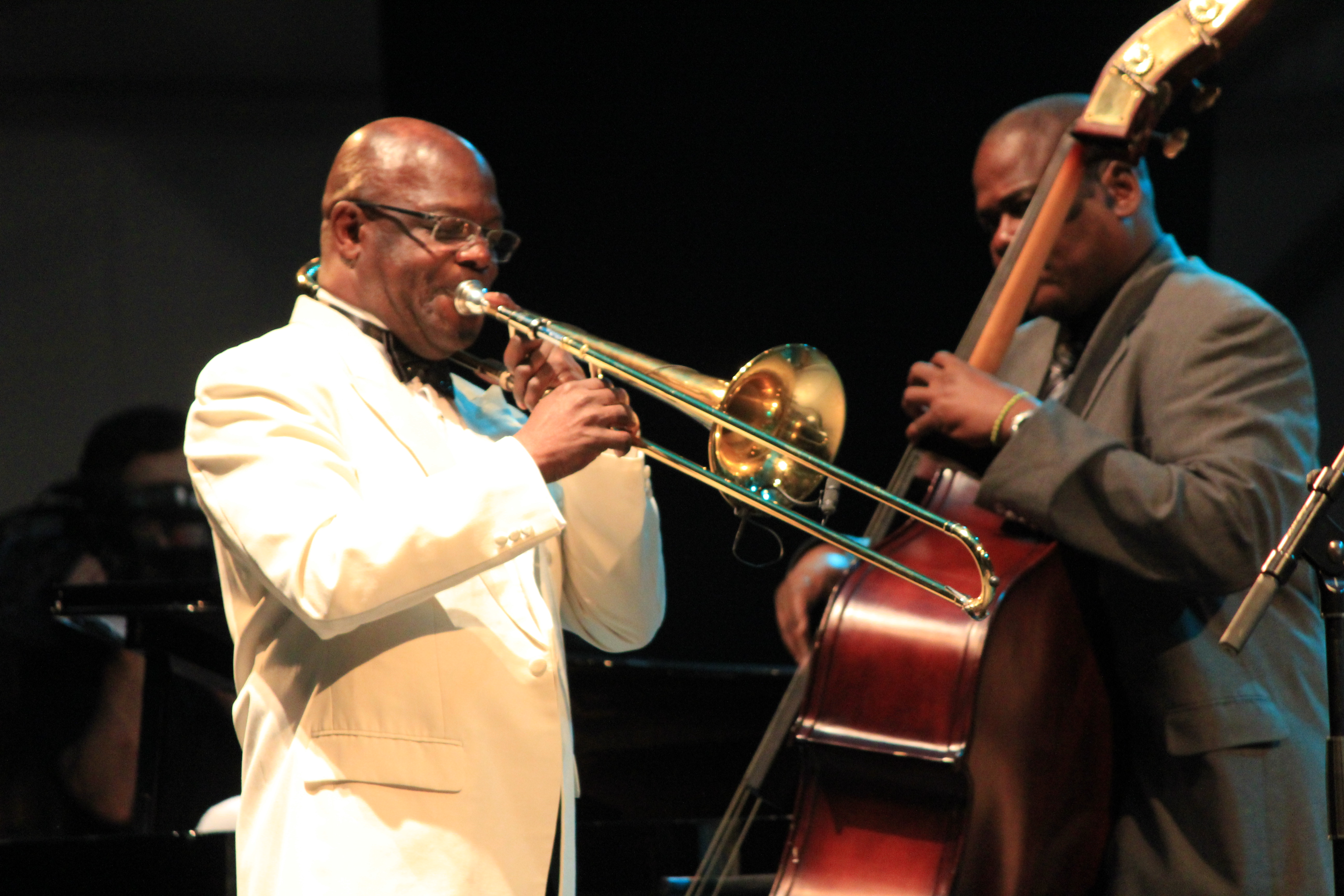
Buena Vista Social Club performing in Lorient in 2012. The image shows trombonist Jesús "Aguaje" Ramos, who replaced Juan de Marcos González as the director of the ensemble. He often includes classic descargas such as Generoso Jiménez's "Trombón majadero" in the repertoire of the group.

In 1981, Walfredo de los Reyes, Cachao and Paquito Hechavarría came together to record Walpataca, a descarga album released by Tania Records. The album was listed as number 60 in Latin Beat Magazine's "Top 100 Independent Recordings" (June/July 2004). The same group (with additional musicians) would record Walpataca II (1985) and Maestro de Maestros (1986) for Tania. Both albums comprise a series of jazzy jams with a variety of themes, from heavy Afro-Cuban percussion to salsa and guaracha. Both albums include the tracks "Bocachaby" and "Walpataca II". Maestro de Maestros featured flautist José Fajardo and percussionist Nelson "Flaco" Padrón.

During the 1990s the descarga format gained worldwide popularity due to the release of several highly successful albums. In 1993, Cuban-born actor Andy García released a documentary about the life and works of Cachao entitled Como su ritmo no hay dos. The following year, Cachao became the first inductee (together with Celia Cruz) in the Billboard Latin Music Hall of Fame. Shortly after, García brought Cachao to a recording studio to record a descarga album, partly in honour of his father (who was friends with Cachao's family) and his hometown, Bejucal, where his father was known as el alcalde (the mayor). The album, entitled Master Sessions Vol. I, became a success, charting in the Billboard Latin 50 and winning the Grammy Award for Best Tropical Latin Album in March 1995. (Note: The winner of this award in 1994 had been Mi Tierra by Gloria Estefan, which featured Cachao on bass, so this was technically his second Grammy.) The follow-up, Master Sessions Vol. 2, which featured Paquito D'Rivera and Rolando Laserie, was released in 1995 and was also nominated for Best Tropical Latin Album but lost to Gloria Estefan's Abriendo Puertas.

In 1995, Nick Gold (head of World Circuit Records) and Juan de Marcos González (director and tres player of Sierra Maestra) decided to record a series of descarga sessions featuring established Cuban musicians together with African virtuosos Toumani Diabate (kora player) and Djelimady Tounkara (guitarist). By early 1996, the Cuban musicians had been already selected and the African musicians were about to travel to Cuba, but due to difficulties in obtaining visas they could not make it. (Note: The project became a reality in 2010 with the recording of Afrocubism.) Gold then invited Ry Cooder and his son Joachim to participate in the sessions; Ry would play guitar and Joachim African percussion. The recording sessions took place in March 1996 in Havana's EGREM studios and yielded two albums released in 1997: A toda Cuba le gusta, credited to the Afro-Cuban All Stars, and Buena Vista Social Club. Both albums, especially the latter, included extended descargas featuring Juan de Marcos on tres, Rubén González (who had taken part in Estrellas de Areíto) on piano, Orlando "Cachaíto" López (Cachao's nephew) on bass and Amadito Valdés on timbales. Buena Vista Social Club went on to become an international sensation, winning the 1998 Grammy for Best Tropical Latin Album and spawning a documentary by Wim Wenders which was nominated for an Academy Award for Best Documentary Feature in 1999. The album directly combined classic Cuban trova and filin with intense descarga jamming. The presence of laúd player Barbarito Torres, as well as Joachim Cooder's udu and dumbek, introduced seldom seen instruments into the genre.

Another Cuban all-star ensemble, Caravana Cubana, recorded and released two albums at the turn of the century, Late Night Sessions (2000) and Del alma (2002). Described as a "serendipitous union of stellar jammers", both sessions include descargas combined with various genres ranging from son to rumba. Among the artists featured were Pío Leyva, Chucho Valdés, Orlando "Maraca" Valle, Bamboleo, Francisco Aguabella and Miguel "Angá" Díaz.

In the 2000s, Cachao achieved three more Grammys in the Tropical Latin Album category. Although the first one was awarded for a jazz album, El Arte del Sabor (2001), with Bebo Valdés and Carlos "Patato" Valdés, the other two consisted of descargas, Ahora sí! (2004) and his posthumous release The Last Mambo (2011), recorded in September 2007. In addition, his 2000 album Cuba linda, also made of descargas, was nominated for the award in 2001 but lost to Alma Caribeña by Gloria Estefan.

== Structure ==
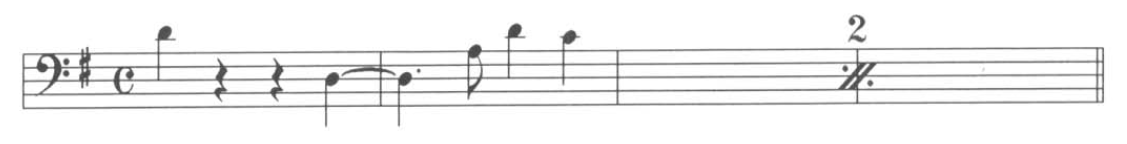
Bass tumbao by Cachao in the intro of "Descarga cubana", from the album Cuban Jam Sessions in Miniature (1957).

In general, descargas are long improvised pieces characterised by the inclusion of repeated guajeos and tumbaos. Solos are often performed by the different musicians, including the singers (if any). Simple choruses are usually repeated by the backing vocalists (coro). Descargas often have a "cyclical harmonic structure of relatively few chords".

With the advent of salsa, descargas began to include elements from other Latin American traditions, especially from Puerto Rico, Colombia and Panamá. An example is Rubén Blades' "Tiburón", which combines typical Cuban rumba percussion with the seis genre from Puerto Rico featuring Yomo Toro on cuatro, as well as the characteristic trombone section of salsa dura.

== See also ==
- Afro-Cuban jazz
- Jazz improvisation
