= Orlando Peña (musician) =

Cuban bassist and songwritwe (1928–1994)

- Birth name: Orlando Peña Alonso
- Born: December 7, 1928; Havana, Cuba
- Died: July 14, 1994 (aged 65); Havana, Cuba
- Genres: Son cubano, guaracha, bolero, guaguancó
- Occupation(s): Musician, songwriter
- Instrument(s): Double bass, marimbula
- Labels: Panart, EGREM

Orlando Peña Alonso (December 7, 1928 – July 14, 1994) was a Cuban double bassist and songwriter. As a musician, he played in the groups of Pancho el Bravo, Félix Reina, Niño Rivera and Enrique Álvarez, among others. In addition, he was an occasional member of the National Symphony Orchestra of Cuba. He was the author of many popular sones and guarachas such as "Tremendo cumbán", "A Don Nadie" and "Muriéndome de risa".

== Life and career ==
Orlando Peña began his musical career playing the marimbula in a traditional son group. He would soon switch to the double bass, joining charangas such as Orquesta Modelo, Orquesta de Pancho el Bravo, and Félix Reina's Estrellas Cubanas in the 1950s and '60s. In the 1970s, Peña was a member of Evaristo Aparicio's group Los Papá Cun Cun.

From early in his career, Peña worked as composer, writing a handful of hit songs over the years. Among his famous compositions are the bolero "Misterio de amor", written in 1948; "Rumba patria", made famous by Pío Leyva; "Muriéndome de risa", popularized by Los Papines, and "El son te llama", sung by Elena Burke. Peña's most covered song was "Tremendo cumbán", recorded in 1953 by Nelo Sosa's Conjunto Colonial to critical acclaim. The following year, it became the title track to Machito's new album on Seeco Tropical. Another danceable son, "Montuno alegre", was featured as the opener track on Niño Rivera's Conjband album on Panart, with Peña himself on bass.
