= Frank Emilio Flynn =

- Born: Francisco Emilio Flynn Rodríguez; April 13, 1921; Havana, Cuba
- Died: August 23, 2001 (aged 80) Havana, Cuba
- Genres: Afro-Cuban jazz, descarga, filin, contradanza, danzón
- Occupations: Musician, bandleader, composer
- Instrument: Piano
- Years active: 1934–2001
- Labels: Duarte, Sonotone, Panart, Areito, Siboney, Milan, RCA, Blue Note

Francisco Emilio Flynn Rodríguez (April 13, 1921 – August 23, 2001), better known as Frank Emilio Flynn, was a renowned Cuban pianist. Blind since adolescence, he was a skilled and versatile pianist who mastered many forms of Cuban music, from danzas and danzones to filin, descarga and Afro-Cuban jazz. He was the founder and director of several ensembles, including Loquibambia (1946) and Los Modernistas (1951), both co-founded with José Antonio Méndez, as well as the Quinteto Instrumental de Música Moderna (1958), which later became Los Amigos.

== Biography ==
=== Early life and career ===
Francisco Emilio Flynn Rodríguez was born in Havana on April 13, 1921, to a Cuban mother and an American father. His eyes were damaged during birth by the doctor's forceps. As a result, he was unable to distinguish shapes as a child, and by his late teens he was totally blind. From a young age he was known as Frank Emilio instead of Francisco Emilio due to his father. His mother died when he was 5 years old and his father returned to the US, so Flynn was raised by his aunt and uncle. In 1934, when he was only 13 years old, Flynn won an amateur music contest and shortly after began to play danzones by Antonio María Romeu. In 1938, Flynn interrupted his career to complete his studies at a school run by Cuba's National Association for the Blind.

=== Filin, jazz and descarga ===
In the 1940s, Flynn became part of the filin music scene which comprised jazz-influenced bolero composers. He accompanied singer Miguel de Gonzalo. In 1946 he founded the Loquibambia ensemble together with guitarist and composer José Antonio Méndez, and they started to work for the Mil Diez radio station. In 1949 they accompanied the famous Conjunto Casino in the recording of their song "Átomo".

In 1951, Flynn founded Los Modernistas, an ensemble featuring José Antonio Méndez on guitar, Justi Barreto on percussion and Francisco Fellove on vocals amongst others. The band played at Radio Cadena Habana and toured the island before disbanding. Flynn then joined a son ensemble, Alejandro y sus Muchachos, and in 1955 he recorded four songs with Arcaño y sus Maravillas.

In 1958, Flynn and other musicians from Havana founded the Club Cubano de Jazz, where they pioneered small-ensemble Cuban jazz. One these jazz combos was the Grupo Cubano de Música Moderna, later known as Quinteto Instrumental de Música Moderna, with Flynn on piano and direction, Tata Güines on congas, Gustavo Tamayo on güiro, Walfredo de los Reyes on drums (replaced by Guillermo Barreto in 1959), and Orlando "Papito" Hernández on bass (replaced in 1965 by Orlando "Cachaíto" López). This jazz quintet often took part in improvised jam sessions known as descargas. They recorded an eponymous LP for Panart under the name Grupo Cubano de Música Moderna in 1959. The album featured Flynn's famous composition "Gandinga, Mondongo y Sandunga". In addition, Flynn continued to cultivate his classical solo performance, recording LPs such as Paisajes de España for Duarte and Danzas y danzones cubanos for Sonotone.

=== Late career ===
After the Cuban Revolution, the members of the Quinteto Instrumental remained in Havana, and in 1962 they took part in the Festival de Música Popular Cubana (Cuban Popular Music Festival) organized by Odilio Urfé. During the 1960s, the band would record several albums and EPs for EGREM. Flynn's solo career continued to thrive with albums such as Danzas cubanas and Música de Cervantes, also recorded for EGREM. He also recorded music for Pianoforte, an EGREM album also featuring pianists Peruchín and Adolfo Guzmán. In 1974, Flynn recorded Frank Emilio presenta a Frank Emilio at EGREM studios featuring his Quinteto Instrumental with a different lineup, including Carlos Emilio Morales on guitar.

In the late 1970s and 1980s, his band expanded incorporating new musicians such as violinist Elio Valdés, flautist Miguel O'Farrill, batá drummer Jesús Pérez, percussionist Angá Díaz, timbalero Changuito, güiro and claves player Enrique Lazaga. Sometimes Carlos del Puerto replaced Cachaíto on bass, and Orlando "Maraca" Valle replaced O'Farrill on flute. This new band was known as Los Amigos. Their debut album was released by Siboney (an EGREM imprint) in 1982. During the 1980s, Los Amigos served as the backing band for singer Merceditas Valdés. In 1985 they recorded Música de Juan Almeida, an album of compositions by Juan Almeida. In 2007, Warner Music released an album entitled Los Amigos (Jazzcuba Vol. 6) which included archival recordings by Flynn's ensemble from 1960 to 1975.

=== Final years and death ===
Frank Emilio is a pianist who has influenced every subsequent generation, and those to come, because he's kept up to date. You can't talk about Frank Emilio in the past because he's still very much present.

— Chucho Valdés, 1998

During the 1990s Flynn recorded several albums including Barbarísimo (1996), Tribute to Ernesto Lecuona (1997) and A Tiempo de Danzón (1998) for Milan/RCA Records, and Ancestral Reflections (1999) for Blue Note. In December 1997 Flynn took part in the Jazz Plaza Festival in Havana. In February 1998 he made his American debut, with Los Amigos, in a Jazz at Lincoln Center gig. The following year he reunited with his American relatives.

Between 2000 and 2001 he spent much of his time with his relatives in California, where he played live occasionally and gave lectures at California State University, Los Angeles. Flynn died August 23, 2001, in Havana. He was buried at the Cristóbal Colón Cemetery.

== Legacy and influence ==
Frank Emilio Flynn is widely considered a pioneer of Afro-Cuban jazz in Cuba and one of the first small-ensemble jazz pianists in the island. He has influenced artists such as David Virelles, Emiliano Salvador, the Orquesta Cubana de Música Moderna and Irakere. Flynn developed novel writing techniques for blind musicians and served as president of Cuba's National Association for the Blind between 1978 and 1981.
