= Francisco Fellove =

Cuban songwriter and singer (1923–2013)

- Birth name: Francisco Fellove Valdés
- Also known as: El Gran Fellove
- Born: October 7, 1923; Havana, Cuba
- Died: February 15, 2013 (aged 89); Mexico City, Mexico
- Genres: Guaracha, bolero, son cubano, cha-cha-cha
- Occupations: Musician, songwriter, jeweler
- Instruments: Vocals
- Labels: Panart, RCA Victor, Musart, Otra, Gema, Gas, Areito

Francisco Fellove Valdés (October 7, 1923 – February 15, 2013), also known as El Gran Fellove (The Great Fellove), was a Cuban songwriter and singer. A prolific composer of the feeling generation, he is well known for his particular style of scat singing known as chua chua. He is the author of the famous guaracha-pregón "Mango mangüé", recorded by Machito and Celia Cruz among others. He was the cousin of conga drummer Carlos "Patato" Valdés.

== Life and career ==
Fellove was born on October 7, 1923, in the neighbourhood of Colón, Havana, Cuba. He started his musical career as a songwriter, primarily of guarachas, but also of boleros such as "Dos caminos", which he wrote for Olga Guillot. Together with other authors of boleros, sones, canciones and guarachas, he became part of the so-called filin movement, where the descarga format began to develop. Soon, several of his guarachas became very popular, especially "Para que tú lo bailes", "Sea como sea" and "Mango mangué". The latter, which he composed when he was only 17 years old, was recorded by numerous artists including Miguelito Valdés, Machito and his Afro-Cubans featuring Charlie Parker, Celia Cruz with La Sonora Matancera, Tito Puente, and Johnny Pacheco, as well as Fellove himself. Based on the fast tempo of his guarachas, which he termed "chua chua", Fellove developed a scat singing technique together with fellow vocalist Dandy Crawford.

In 1952, Fellove took part in some of the descargas (jam sessions) directed by Julio Gutiérrez at Panart Studios in Havana (released in 1956). In December 1955 he moved to Mexico with fellow filin songwriter José Antonio Méndez and joined the cha-cha-cha group Conjunto Batamba. In 1956 he met Mexican promoter and head of RCA Victor in Mexico Mariano Rivera Conde, who gave him the nickname "El Gran Fellove", kickstarting his solo career. Among his first solo recordings for RCA Victor were "Mango mangüé", Niño Rivera's "El jamaiquino" and "Azul pintado de azul", backed by Lobo y Melón. In 1957, RCA Victor released an LP of Fellove's recordings entitled El Gran Fellove.

In the 1960s, Fellove switched from RCA Victor to Musart, releasing Watusi in 1966. Fellove continued to record and perform in Mexico, the US and throughout Latin America. He played with Tito Puente and Machito in New York City. In 1979 he released his last album as a leader with his Conjunto Habana featuring Niño Rivera on tres. In 2002 he recorded a cover version of "Walking on the Moon".

Fellove died on February 15, 2013, in Mexico City.

== Discography ==
- 1957: El Gran Fellove (RCA Victor)
- 1958: Chua chua con su creador El Gran Fellove, Vol. II (RCA Victor)
- 1965: Goza mi ritmo (Otra/RCA Victor)
- 1966: Watusi (Musart)
- 1973: El que inventó la salsa (Gema)
- 1977: Salsa con Fellove (Gas); reissued as La escena presenta al Gran Fellove (La Escena)
- 1979: Fellove (Areito) - with Conjunto Habana
