= Peruchín =

Cuban pianist (1913–1977)

- Also known as: Peruchín Jústiz
- Born: Pedro Nolasco Jústiz Rodríguez; January 31, 1913; Banes, Holguín, Cuba
- Died: December 24, 1977 (aged 64) La Habana, Cuba
- Genres: Son, bolero, mambo, jazz, descarga
- Occupations: Musician, bandleader, conductor, arranger, composer
- Instrument: Piano
- Years active: 1923–1977
- Labels: Panart, Puchito, Gema, Velvet, EGREM

Pedro Nolasco Jústiz Rodríguez, better known as Peruchín (January 31, 1913 – December 24, 1977), was a Cuban pianist specializing in jazz-influenced Cuban popular music. He was an important figure in the 1950s descarga (jam session) scene in Havana, and one of the most influential Cuban pianists of the 20th century.

== Biography ==
=== Early life and career ===
Pedro Jústiz was born in Banes, Holguín, on January 31, 1913, into a family of local musicians. Taught by his mother since 1923, he soon learned to play the piano and joined the family band La Rechiva del Son, directed by his uncles. In 1928 he moved to Antilla to study piano and saxophone under the supervision of his grandfather, Emilio Rodríguez.

In Santiago, Peruchín had to give up the saxophone due to his asthma, so he concentrated on piano. In the mid-1930s he debuted with Orquesta Chepín-Chovén, where he would alternate on piano with director Bernardo Chovén. In 1940, he joined Los Trovadores del Tono, where he met José "Chombo" Silva and encouraged him to take up the saxophone. Silva would become a successful saxophonist and violinist in the New York salsa scene. Los Trovadores del Tono was directed by drummer Aurelio Miró Jr., who shortly after moved to Havana, as did Peruchín and other members of the band.

In Havana, Peruchín worked occasionally with Orquesta Casino de la Playa and Mariano Mercerón's orchestra. In 1942 he joined Los Swing Boys, a big band directed by saxophonist Emilio Peñalver and featuring José "Chombo" Silva. He then became a member of the Conjunto Matamoros, an expanded version of the Trio Matamoros. In 1943 he joined Armando Romeu's Tropicana Club orchestra. He rejected an offer by Mario Bauzá to replace Joe Loco in his band, The Afrocubans, and instead recommended René Hernández.

=== Panama and back in Cuba ===
Between 1944 and 1949 he lived in Panama, where he played in Carlos Boza's band, frequently performing in clubs and radio stations. After returning to Havana he joined Julio Gutiérrez's orchestra at the Teatro Campoamor. He then formed a duo with double bassist Alfredo León before joining the popular Orquesta Riverside. He then arranged for singer Olga Guillot and was the pianist in Benny Moré's Banda Gigante during the year 1953. Playing with the Riverside did not prevent him from performing with various ensembles, including descarga sessions with Julio Gutiérrez (Panart's Cuban Jam Session), Chico O'Farrill, Emilio Peñalver, and Antobal's Cuban All-Stars. He also directed his own ensembles into the 1960s, releasing LPs such as Piano con moña (recorded in March 1958). He eventually left Orquesta Riverside, focusing on his jazz groups. He formed a trio with Alberto Limonta on double bass and Rodolfo Castiñeira on drums and percussion. He occasionally played in the Club Cubano de Jazz with musicians such as bassist Cachao and drummer Walfredo de los Reyes. He also worked with bassist Cachaíto and drummer Tibo Lee.

=== Later years and death ===
Peruchín faded from the forefront of the Cuban jazz scene in the second half of the 1960s, giving way to up-and-coming figures such as Chucho Valdés. Since 1972, he sometimes replaced Frank Emilio Flynn in his band Quinteto Instrumental de Música Moderna (also known as Los Amigos), featuring Cachaíto on bass, Guillermo Barreto on drums and Tata Güines on congas. In 1975 he released his last album Piano y ritmo. On December 24, 1977, he died in Havana.

== Style ==
He was the greatest pianist in Cuban music, and there were some very good pianists around in those days: Lilí Martínez, Jesús López, Lino Frías. But what Peruchín could do in one phrase was without equal. And what he did harmonically, rhythmically, was so modern. He was 30, 40 years ahead of his time. Every important Latin pianist I know ... has copied or been influenced by him.

— Paquito Hechavarría, 1995

Peruchín's style was characterized by the frequent use of block chords, as heard in "Peruchineando", influencing notable pianists such as Charlie Palmieri, George Shearing, Eddie Palmieri, Papo Lucca, Chucho Valdés and Alfredo "Sabor" Linares. Famed pianist Bebo Valdés was his disciple. Together with Lilí Martínez, Noro Morales and Jesús López, he is responsible for establishing the modern Cuban piano style. His frantic way of concatenating guajeos gave rise to a neologism: peruchinear. Such style has been said to combine a "percussive" right hand with a "swinging" left hand.

== Family ==
His son, Pedro Andrés Jústiz Márquez, "Peruchín Jr.", is a guitarist (and pianist too) who played with Orquesta Revé and Los Reyes '73, before directing his own band. His grandson, Rodolfo Argudín Jústiz, also known as Peruchín, is a pianist as well, playing timba with NG La Banda.

== Discography ==
=== Albums ===
- 1954: His Piano and Rhythm Accompaniment (Puchito)
- 1960: Piano con moña (Gema; re-released as The Incendiary Piano of Peruchín)
- 1960: Can can cha (Velvet; re-released as Descargas con el ritmo de Cachao)
- 1964: Pianoforte (EGREM) – split with Adolfo Guzmán and Frank Emilio Flynn
- 1966: Guantanamera (Areito)
- 1975: Piano y ritmo (Areito; re-released as ¡La descarga!)

=== Compilations ===
- 2005: El Marqués del Marfil: Grabaciones indispensables 1954–1965 (Tumbao Cuban Classics)

=== Appearances ===
With Julio Gutiérrez

- Cuban Jam Session, Vol. 1 (Panart, 1956)
- Cuban Jam Session, Vol. 2 (Panart, 1957)

With Chico O'Farrill's All Star Cuban Band / All-Stars Cubano

- Chico's Cha Cha Cha (Panart, 1957)
- "Descarga número uno / Descarga número dos" (Gema, 1957)
- Los mejores músicos de Cuba (Gema, 1959)
