= Lucy Fabery =

Puerto Rican singer (1931–2015)

- Born: Luz Ercilia Fabery Zenón; January 25, 1931; Humacao, Puerto Rico
- Died: May 13, 2015 (aged 84) Hato Rey, Puerto Rico
- Genres: Bolero, Latin jazz
- Years active: 1946–2015
- Labels: Panart, RCA Victor, Seeco, Ansonia

Luz Ercilia Fabery Zenón (January 25, 1931 – May 13, 2015), known as Lucy Fabery, was a Puerto Rican singer who specialized in the style of bolero known as filin. She recorded four albums and numerous singles in a career that spanned over 50 years.

== Life and career ==
Fabery was born in Humacao, Puerto Rico in 1931 to Don Rafael Fabery and Petra Zenón. She studied at Ana Roqué de Duprey High School, in Humacao. She participated in the University of Puerto Rico Choir, led by the late Maestro Bartolomé Bover. It was during those student days in Río Piedras, where he studied teaching and later X-ray technician. In 1952, Fabery began singing at the cabaret El Morocco in New York City.

Due to her physique, Fabery was known as "La Muñeca de Chocolate" (The Chocolate Doll). The fact that she performed solely in Spanish made her a rare and unique fixture in American jazz clubs. Additionally, she was famous for having a "hoarse voice" and for her use of sensuality onstage. She met Miguelito Valdés and traveled with him to New York and Havana. Throughout the 1950s, Fabery toured México, Cuba, Venezuela, Colombia and Ecuador.

In the mid 1950s, Fabery recorded one album with Cuban keyboardist and conductor Julio Gutiérrez in Havana. It was released by Panart as a 10" LP, Tentación. In 1956, she recorded four singles for RCA Victor. She later recorded with Aníbal Herrero's orchestra for Ansonia Records in the early 1960s. Seeco Records signed her in 1962. In April 1962, she recorded her sole album for the label, Noche de locura, which contained twelve boleros by composers such as Puchi Balseiro and René Touzet.

She later worked as an actress and in 1987 recorded an eponymous album featuring Latin jazz musicians such as Jerry González, Andy González and Eddie Gómez. In 2006, she released her last album, Divinamente, Lucy Fabery, featuring Humberto Ramírez.

Fabery died on May 13, 2015, aged 84, of natural causes at Auxilio Mutuo Hospital in Hato Rey, Puerto Rico. She was buried at Cementerio Historico Municipal Barrio La Pratt in Humacao, Puerto Rico as her wish to be buried at her hometown.
