= Puchi Balseiro =

Puerto Rican composer (1926–2007)

- Puchi Balseiro

Background information
- Birth name: Aurea Mercedes Balseiro Vachier
- Born: November 1, 1926
- Origin: Santurce, Puerto Rico
- Died: January 11, 2007 (aged 80)
- Genres: Bolero
- Years active: 1950—2006

Puchi Balseiro (born Aurea Mercedes Balseiro; November 1, 1926, in Santurce, Puerto Rico – January 11, 2007) was a composer in the filin ("feeling") music genre.

== Early years ==
Puchi Balseiro was born in a district of San Juan called Santurce, and comes from a dynasty of great musicians and composers of different genres. Her grandfather was waltz composer Rafael Balseiro Dávila, also known as The King of Waltz. Also, Balseiro's father Ramón Balseiro Ramos was a prominent Puerto Rican composer of danzas and boleros. She was the first woman in the family to follow their steps in music, yet in different genres: Bolero and pop.

== Songwriter ==
She was a natural composer and guitarist. She described her guitar as her best friend, as she used it constantly to compose her songs. Puchi's best-known compositions were "En La Soledad" (In Solitude) and "Tu y mi Canción" (You and my Song). "En la Soledad" was a hit song in the 1970s in the version performed by Puerto Rican singer Tito Rodríguez, although there were previous versions sung by other singers such as Chucho Avellanet, Julio Angel, and Flor de Loto. In the 1990s, Gilberto Santa Rosa had a hit with this song, recorded as duet with the original voice of Tito Rodríguez by the help of digital technology. "Tu y mi Canción" was a hit song in the 1950s in the recording of the Puerto Rican vocal quartet "Los Hispanos"; this song was also recorded in an instrumental version by the "Dimartino/Osland Jazz Orquestra" in 2004.

== Other talents ==
Puchi Balseiro was also a singer, producer, script writer and host of various radio & television shows. In 1970, Puchi originated, produced, and directed the "Festivales del Filin" (The Feeling Festivals). They were concert events that were presented in different theaters and cruise ships on the island. Many singers of those times were regulars in these spectacles because of their unusual style of interpretation, such as Lucy Fabery, Renee Barrios, Lydia Sosa, and Flor de Loto.

== Television ==
From 1993 to 1994, she produced and hosted her own television show, broadcast by WIPR-TV and titled Usted y mi Mundo (You and My World). The set was a re-creation of a beautiful chalet she owned. It was a very intimate musical show.

== Death ==
She died on January 14, 2007, in Río Piedras, Puerto Rico. The director of the Puerto Rican Culture Institute, Dr. José Luis Vega, stated: "... Puchi Balseiro's incalculable cultural legacy is part of the history of Puerto Rican and Latin American music, and it will serve as a model and good example for future generations of composers ...".
