= Cachao y su Descarga 77 =

Studio album by Cachao
- Released: 1977
- Recorded: July 1976
- Studio: Plaza Sound Studios, NYC
- Genre: Descarga, danzón, criolla
- Length: 34:51
- Label: Salsoul
- Producer: René López, Andy Kaufman

Cachao chronology
Descargas con el ritmo de Cachao (1974)	Cachao y su Descarga 77 (1977)	Dos (1977)

Cachao y su Descarga 77 is the first album recorded as a leader by Cachao in the United States, following his exile from Cuba in 1962. It was recorded in July 1976 under the supervision of musicologist René López, who was responsible for organizing the sessions. The LP was released in 1977 by Salsoul to critical acclaim. The songs included in the release are in the descarga format, i.e. improvised jam sessions, and were performed by a predominantly Cuban lineup featuring trumpeter Alfredo "Chocolate" Armenteros, percussionist Carlos "Patato" Valdés and flautist Gonzalo Fernández, among others.

Considered Cachao's "comeback album", it was followed by Dos, which was recorded during the same sessions. Although praised by critics, both albums had limited commercial success and virtually no airplay.

== Reception ==
Professional ratings
Review scores
Source	Rating
Christgau's Record Guide	A−

The album was well received by critics. A contemporary review published on the Stereo Review magazine classified it as a "recording of special merit" and rated the performance as "superb" and the recording quality as "good". It highlighted Cachao's role as an innovator in Cuban music, comparing him to Duke Ellington. The DownBeat review highlighted the high quality of the performers describing those on side A (tracks 1 and 2) as "the finest interpreters of pure Afro-Cuban music in the U.S.", and those on tracks 3 and 4 as "the leading exponents of the modern charanga". It also praised the closing track, "a stark and moving rendition of 'La bayamesa'", which had also closed his 1958 album Jam Session with Feeling.

== Track listing ==
No.	Title	Writer(s)	Length
1.	"La trompeta y la flauta"	Cachao	9:11
2.	"A ti no te falta nada"	Eugenio "Totico" Arango	7:54
3.	"Adelante"	Cachao	7:18
4.	"Se va el matancero"	Cachao	7:14
5.	"La bayamesa"	Sindo Garay	3:12

== Personnel ==
- Cachao – music direction, acoustic bass (on tracks 1–4), piano (on track 5), Baby Bass (on track 5)
- Andy González – acoustic bass (on track 5)
- Alfredo "Chocolate" Armenteros – trumpet (on tracks 1 & 2)
- Alejandro "El Negro" Vivar – trumpet (on tracks 1 & 2)
- Gonzalo Fernández – flute (on tracks 1–4)
- Lino Frías – piano (on tracks 1 & 2)
- Charlie Palmieri – piano (on tracks 3 & 4)
- Rolando Valdés – güiro (on tracks 1–4)
- Carlos "Patato" Valdés – congas (on tracks 1 & 2)
- Julito Collazo – percussion (on tracks 1 & 2)
- Virgilio Martí – percussion (on tracks 1 & 2)
- Mario "Papaíto" Muñoz – percussion (on tracks 1 & 2)
- Julián Cabrera – percussion (on tracks 3 & 4)
- Osvaldo "Chihuahua" Martínez – timbales (on tracks 3 & 4)
- Manny Oquendo – percussion (on track 5)
- Eugenio "Totico" Arango, Rafael "Felo" Barrios, Marcelino Guerra, Roberto Torres – background vocals (on tracks 1 & 2)
- Félix "Pupi" Legarreta, Alfredo de la Fé, Eddie Drennon, Carl Ector, Patricia Dixon – violin (on tracks 3 & 4)

Technical

- Fred Weinberg – engineer
- René López – producer
- Andy Kaufman – producer
- Joe Cayre – executive producer
