= EGREM =

Cuban state recording studio and publisher

- Founded: 1964
- Genre: Cuban music
- Country of origin: Cuba
- Location: Calle San Miguel No. 410, Centro Habana, Havana
- Official website: www.egrem.com.cu

EGREM (Empresa de Grabaciones y Ediciones Musicales, Spanish for Enterprise of Recordings and Musical Editions) is the national record label of Cuba. It is headquartered in Centro Habana, where its main record studios (Estudios Areito 101 & 102) operate. It was founded in 1964 after the nationalization of the Cuban music industry, absorbing the assets of Panart. EGREM had a monopoly on music production activities from 1964 until the late 1980s when independent labels reemerged. EGREM's archive comprises "the most extensive catalog of Cuban music in the world".

Since 2002, EGREM has a commercial director, a public relations department and a web site. Although the label had a history of international licensing deals, direct distribution of EGREM's music did not occur until August 2004, when several agreements were made between the label and European record companies. In 2005, the SGAE (Spanish copyright agency) began to distribute part of EGREM's catalog online. On September 15, 2015, Sony Music announced that it would distribute EGREM's recordings internationally.

== Sub-labels ==
Until 1996, EGREM distributed music recorded at its Havana studios under the imprint Areito. Between the early 1980s and 1996, music from its Santiago de Cuba studios were released under the imprint Siboney.

During the mid to late 1960s, the international distribution of Areito LPs and EPs was handled by Palma, a short-lived imprint organized by EGREM. In the 1970s, Palma was replaced by Guamá, an imprint launched by EGREM to commercialize Cuban music around the world.

EGREM also manages live venues throughout Cuba under the name Casa de la Música.

== Roster ==
Since its foundation EGREM has recorded the vast majority of artists that remained in the island. Many others, such as Celia Cruz, Bebo Valdés and Cachao, went into exile. Starting in the late 1990s, EGREM runs an agency called Musicuba to manage its artists in Havana. A second agency called Son de Cuba operates since 2012 in Santiago de Cuba.

The following artists have recorded material released by EGREM:

- Algo Nuevo
- Juan Almeida
- Pacho Alonso
- Adalberto Álvarez y su Son
- Paulina Álvarez
- Orquesta Aragón
- Carlos Averhoff
- Guillermo Barreto
- Bola de Nieve
- Lino Borges
- Esther Borja
- Los Bucaneros
- Elena Burke
- Barbarito Díez
- Felipe Dulzaides y Los Armónicos
- Hilario Durán
- Rembert Egües
- Estrellas de Areito
- Los Fakires
- Roberto Faz
- Frank Fernández
- Joseíto Fernández
- Frank Emilio Flynn
- Rosita Fornés
- Rubén González
- Grupo de Experimentación Sonora del ICAIC
- Rey Guerra
- Tata Güines
- Adolfo Guzmán
- Irakere
- Enrique Jorrín
- Los Latinos
- Gina León
- Pío Leyva
- Farah María
- Beatriz Márquez
- Pablo Milanés
- Grupo Moncada
- Grupo Monumental
- Fernando Mulens
- NG La Banda
- Noel Nicola
- Jesús Ortega
- Los Papines
- Pello El Afrokán
- Raúl Planas
- Rodrigo Prats
- Carlos Puebla
- Elio Revé
- Ritmo Oriental
- Niño Rivera
- Orquesta Riverside
- Silvio Rodríguez
- Ñico Rojas
- Orquesta Antonio María Romeu
- Gonzalo Rubalcaba
- Conjunto Rumbavana
- Eduardo Saborit
- Arturo Sandoval
- Senén Suárez
- Juan Pablo Torres
- Chucho Valdés
- Merceditas Valdés
- Los Van Van
- Conjunto Yarey
- Grupo Yoyi
- Los Zafiros
- Malena Burke

== See also ==
- Panart
- List of record labels
