= Latin Grammy Hall of Fame =

- Awarded for: "Early recordings of lasting qualitative or historical significance that were released more than 25 years ago"
- Presented by: Latin Recording Academy
- First award: 2001
- Final award: 2013
- Website: www.latingrammy.com

The Latin Grammy Hall of Fame is a hall of fame established by the Latin Recording Academy to recognize "early recordings of lasting qualitative or historical significance that were released more than 25 years ago". LARAS is also the same organization that distributes the Latin Grammy Awards. The albums and songs are picked by a panel of recording-arts professionals, such as musicologists and historians, and selected from all major categories of Latin music.

The first inductions were made in 2001 to honor 17 recordings. These included Santana's cover of Tito Puente's "Oye Como Va", Javier Solís's rendition of "Sabor a Mí" and the 1948 performance of Joaquín Rodrigo's Concierto de Aranjuez by Regino Sainz de la Maza and the Orquesta Nacional de España. The inductions have each occurred six years apart from one another.

"La Bamba" by Ritchie Valens and Chega de Saudade by João Gilberto were also inducted into the Grammy Hall of Fame in 2000. Getz/Gilberto by Stan Getz and João Gilberto won the Grammy Award for Album of the Year at the 7th Annual Grammy Awards in 1965. "El Manisero (The Peanut Vendor)" by Don Azpiazu and Cuban Jam Sessions in Miniature/Descargas by Cachao were inducted into the National Recording Registry in 2005 and 2012 respectively. "Eres tú" by Mocedades placed second on the 1973 Eurovision Song Contest. Brazilian musician Antônio Carlos Jobim is the artist with the most works inducted into the Latin Grammy Hall of Fame with four recordings.

== Recipients ==
Year^{[I]}	Work	Artist(s)	Release year	Genre	Format	Ref.
2001	Adiós Nonino	Astor Piazzolla	1969	Traditional	Album	
2001	"La Barca"	Lucho Gatica	1960	Tropical	Single	
2001	"Bésame Mucho"	Pedro Vargas	1941	Tropical	Single	
2001	Caetano Veloso	Caetano Veloso	1967	Brazilian	Album	
2001	Chega de Saudade	João Gilberto	1959	Brazilian	Album	
2001	The Composer of Desafinado Plays	Antônio Carlos Jobim	1963	Brazilian	Album	
2001	Concierto de Aranjuez	Regino Sainz de la Maza and the Orquesta Nacional de España	1948	Classical	Album	
2001	"Desafinado"	João Gilberto	1958	Brazilian	Single	
2001	"El Día Que Me Quieras"	Carlos Gardel	1935	Traditional	Single	
2001	"Garota de Ipanema (The Girl from Ipanema)"	Antônio Carlos Jobim	1963	Brazilian	Single	
2001	Getz/Gilberto	Stan Getz and João Gilberto featuring Antônio Carlos Jobim and Astrud Gilberto	1963	Brazilian	Album	
2001	"Mambo #5"	Pérez Prado	1950	Tropical	Single	
2001	"El Manisero (The Peanut Vendor)"	Don Azpiazú	1930	Tropical	Single	
2001	"Oye Como Va"	Santana	1970	Rock	Single	
2001	"El reloj"	Lucho Gatica	1959	Tropical	Single	
2001	"Sabor a Mí"	Javier Solís	1960	Regional Mexican	Single	
2001	"Somos Novios"	Armando Manzanero	1970	Tropical	Single	
2007	"Caballo Viejo"	Roberto Torres y su Charanga Vallenata	1980	Traditional tropical	Single	
2007	Elis & Tom	Elis Regina and Antônio Carlos Jobim	1974	MPB	Album	
2007	Español and More Vol. 1	Nat King Cole	1958	Traditional pop	Album	
2007	Detalles	Roberto Carlos	1971	Brazilian-romantic	Album	
2007	Irakere	Irakere	1979	Latin jazz	Album	
2007	Mediterráneo	Joan Manuel Serrat	1971	Singer-songwriter	Album	
2007	"Mi Viejo"	Piero	1969	Singer-songwriter	Single	
2007	"Muchacha Ojos de Papel"	Almendra	1969	Rock	Single	
2007	"Rayito de Luna"	Los Panchos	1960	Pop	Single	
2007	"El Rey"	José Alfredo Jiménez	1971	Ranchera	Single	
2007	Siembra	Willie Colón and Rubén Blades	1978	Salsa	Album	
2007	"Son de la Loma"	Trio Matamoros	1928	Traditional tropical	Single	
2013	Amor Eterno	Rocío Dúrcal	1984	Pop	Album	
2013	"América América"	Nino Bravo	1973	Pop	Single	
2013	"La Bamba"	Ritchie Valens	1959	Rock	Single	
2013	Cuban Jam Sessions in Miniature/Descargas	Israel López "Cachao"	1957	Jazz	Album	
2013	"Cómo Fue"	Beny Moré	1953	Tropical	Single	
2013	Dulce Patria	Jorge Negrete	1950	Regional Mexican	Album	
2013	"Eres tú"	Mocedades	1973	Traditional	Single	
2013	"Gracias a la Vida"	Violeta Parra	1966	Traditional	Single	
2013	Jovem Guarda	Roberto Carlos	1965	Pop	Album	
2013	"Mais Que Nada"	Sérgio Mendes & Brazil '66	1966	Brazilian	Single	
2013	"Porque Yo Te Amo"	Sandro	1968	Pop	Single	
2013	Teatro Amadeo Roldán – Recital	Irakere	1974	Jazz	Album	

^{^[I]} Each year is linked to an article about the Latin Grammy Awards ceremony of that year.

== See also ==
- Billboard Latin Music Hall of Fame
- Category:Music halls of fame
- Grammy Hall of Fame
- International Latin Music Hall of Fame
- Latin Songwriters Hall of Fame
- List of halls and walks of fame
