= Guillermo Barreto =

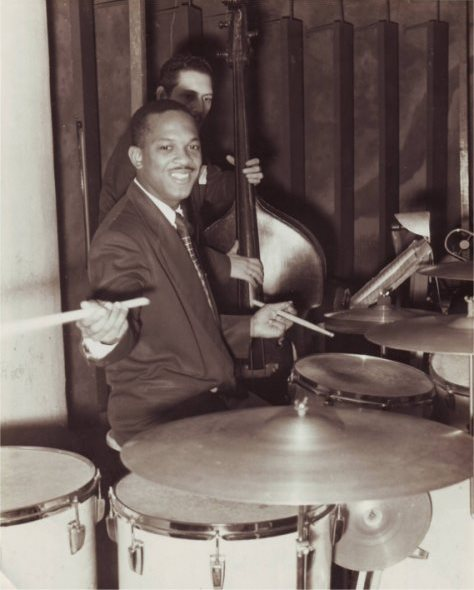
- Guillermo Barreto with bassist Kike Hernández

Background information
- Birth name: Guillermo Barreto Brown
- Also known as: Barretico
- Born: August 11, 1929; La Habana, Cuba
- Died: December 14, 1991 (aged 62); La Habana, Cuba
- Genres: Big band; cha-cha-cha; descarga; Afro-Cuban jazz
- Occupations: Musician; arranger
- Instruments: Drums; timbales
- Labels: Panart; EGREM

Guillermo Barreto (August 11, 1929 – December 14, 1991) was a Cuban drummer and timbalero. He was a major figure in the Cuban music scene for more than fifty years and one of the first drummers in Cuba to play Afro-Cuban jazz.

== Nicknames ==
Like many Cuban musicians, Guillermo Barreto had several nicknames. He was usually credited as "Barretico" during the 1950s and 1960s. He was also known as "El Loro" (The Parrot) and "Pata de loro" (Parrot leg) "due to his constant chatter and parrotlike walk", a nickname given to him by Rita Montaner according to Paquito D'Rivera.

== Biography ==
=== Early life and career ===
Barreto was born in Havana on August 11, 1929. His father was Primo Barreto, a clarinetist who taught music to all of his children: Lita, Josefina, Estela, Alejandro "Coco", Roberto "Bobby", and Guillermo. (Note: Josefina would marry Giraldo Piloto Bea, one of Cuba's most prolific songwriters of the 20th century.) As a young man, Guillermo became a skilled interpreter of Cuban pailas. In the 1940s, he was part of several big bands: the Cabaret Tropicana resident orchestra (directed by Obdulio Morales), the Sans Souci resident orchestra (directed by Rafael Ortega) and Armando Romeu González's orchestra. Soon he was playing his own arrangements and compositions. Between 1943 and 1946, he studied piano under the supervision of Rafael Ortega. This swing background would allow him to take his music into the realm of Afro-Cuban jazz as part of the Quinteto Instrumental de Música Moderna, which he founded in 1958 alongside Frank Emilio Flynn. He was so highly regarded that during a visit to Cuba by Stan Kenton's orchestra, Guillermo replaced an ill Buddy Rich for one night's performance.

=== Descarga and Afro-Cuban jazz ===
Guillermo Barreto was one of the few Cuban drummers who understood the subtleties of playing jazz with an authentic American swing (...). In addition, he had a very special ear and, above all, an exquisite musical taste. His playing technique was low-key and understated.

— Paquito D'Rivera

Inspired by bop drummers like Max Roach and Roy Haynes, by the early 1950s, Guillermo would organize the Sunday afternoon jam sessions (known as descargas) at the legendary Cabaret Tropicana (featuring stars such as Bebo Valdés (Note: Bebo and Guillermo were neighbours and they became very close friends, often calling each other primo (cousin). This has led many to believe that they were actually cousins.)), often doing the transcription necessary to explain American jazz music to his bandmates to play. He played in Cachao's famous 1957 sessions, and in 1959 the first Quinteto Instrumental de Música Moderna LP came out under the name Grupo Cubano de Música Moderna. By the early 1960s, he was amongst the most prolific drummers in the Cuban jazz scene, playing with the likes of Chucho Valdés, Fernando Mulens, Peruchín and, since 1967, the all-star big band known as Orquesta Cubana de Música Moderna.

The Quinteto Instrumental de Música Moderna, "which quickly gained stature as a benchmark in Cuban Latin jazz history", would later evolve into Los Amigos in the 1980s. The band would include guest musicians such as Miguel O'Farrill and Elio Valdés, and they backed singer Merceditas Valdés, Barreto's wife since the late 1950s.

Friends with another younger Cuban drummer, Hilario Durán, (Hilario worked with Guillermo in the Orquesta Cubana de Música Moderna) in 1991, he introduced Hilario to the Canadian flautist Jane Bunnett. Both men then went on to appear on her famous Afro-Cuban recording Spirits of Havana.

=== Death ===
On December 14, 1991, two months after the recording of Spirits of Havana, Barreto died in his hometown, Havana. His wife died on June 13, 1996.

Barreto has been considered a notable influence by many Cuban drummers such as Conrado "Coky" García.

== Discography ==
With Jane Bunnett

- Spirits of Havana (Messidor, 1993)

With Cachao

- Cuban Jam Sessions in Miniature "Descargas" (Panart, 1957)

With Frank Emilio / Quinteto Instrumental de Música Moderna / Los Amigos

- Grupo Cubano de Música Moderna (Panart, 1959; reissued by EGREM, 1964)
- Drume negrita (Areito, 1964; EP)
- Jazz 6 PM (Areito, 1964)
- Algo bueno (Areito, 1964; EP)
- Color y ritmo (Areito, 1964)
- Rico melao (Areito, 1964)
- Estos son Los Amigos (Siboney, 1982)
- Los Amigos (Warner Music, 2007; archival, recorded 1960–75)
- Complete Recordings 1960–1962 (Yemayá, 2007; recorded 1960–62)

With Juanito Márquez / Combo Siboney

- Cuba Sax Cha-Cha (Velvet, 1960)
- Descarga latina (Discmedi, 1995; archival, recorded in 1966)

With Fernando Mulens

- Piano y ritmo (Areito, 1964)

With Chico O'Farrill

- Chico's Cha Cha Cha (Panart, 1957)

With Orquesta Cubana de Música Moderna

- Consejo Nacional de Cultura (Areito, 1967)

With Peruchín

- Piano con moña (Gema, 1960)

With Tojo

- Ritmo (Kubaney, 1957)

With Chucho Valdés

- Por la libre (Areito, 1964; EP)
- Jazz nocturno (Areito, 1964)

With Los Zafiros

- Bossa Cubana (World Circuit, 1999; recorded 1963–67)

== Tributes ==
- Havana Drum Festival: Celebration of the drum in memoriam Guillermo Barreto (Amadeo Roldán Theatre, November 5–10, 2002).
