= Ñico Rojas =

Cuban composer and guitarist (1921–2008)

Ñico Rojas (August 3, 1921 – November 22, 2008 in Havana, Cuba) was a prominent Cuban composer and guitarist, considered as one of the founders of a style of Cuban song called filin.

== Biography ==
José Antonio Rojas, nicknamed Ñico Rojas, began playing the guitar as an autodidact at a very young age. He entered the University of Havana when he was 18 years old to study hydraulic engineering.

In the 1940s, while he was still studying at the University, Ñico became a member of a group of artists that created a new style of Cuban song, called filin, which combined Cuban rhythms with harmonies and melodies influenced by American jazz during the 1940s and 1950s.

After graduating Rojas moved to the city of Matanzas, where he worked as an engineer on projects such as bridges and viaducts, and teaching hydrology at the Instituto José Martí.

At the same time, Ñico Rojas composed songs such as the boleros "Mi Ayer", "Ahora sí sé que te quiero" y "Sé consciente", which were recorded by renowned singers Pepe Reyes, Orlando Vallejo and Miguelito Valdés; and numerous pieces for the guitar that included influences from classical music as well as from popular traditions. Rojas was able to create a unique guitar style that showed great complexity and technical virtuosity, about which the Cuban musicologist Leonardo Acosta said: "it overflows with emotion, vitality and intellect".

Ñico Rojas used to offer concerts on an annual basis at the Cuban National Museum of Fine Arts (Museo Nacional de Bellas Artes) in Havana, which served to promote his music with people in Havana. He recorded his first album, Suite Cubana para Guitarra, in 1964, and another one in 1977.

The Canadian flautist and saxophonist Jane Bunnet recorded Rojas's piece "Tony and Jesusito" in a 1993 album named Jane Bunnett & the Cuban Piano Masters (Blue Note), together with the well-known Cuban pianist Frank Emilio Flynn, which included the same piece, as well as another one titled "Mi Ayer" in an album called "Barbarismo", recorded in 1997. "Mi Ayer" was also included by singer Omara Portuondo in her album "Palabras" from 1997. Ñico Rojas traveled to New York 1998 to perform at the Lincoln Center together with other prominent musicians including Frank Emilio Flynn, Orlando "Cachaíto" López and Winton Marsalis; and the renowned guitarist Marco Tamayo recorded five of his compositions in his album titled Music from Cuba (Naxos Classical), in 2004.

Ñico Rojas's guitar pieces have been transcribed by Cuban guitarist Martín Pedreira, and by José A. Perez Miranda y Ahmed Dickinson, and published by EGREM in Cuba.

Rojas received numerous distinctions in Cuba, including an award by the UNEAC (National Union of Writers and Artists of Cuba) in 1994.

== See also ==
Music of Cuba
