= Eusebio Delfín =

Cuban musician (1893–1965)

Eusebio Delfín y Figueroa (1 April 1893 in Palmira – 28 April 1965 in Havana) was a Cuban banker and musician, recognized for the introduction of arpeggio to Cuban popular music, as well as for his numerous compositions, interpreted by the Buena Vista Social Club, Celia Cruz, Omara Portuondo, and others.

== Biography ==
Nicknamed "The Aristocrat Trobadour", Eusebio Delfín was born in Palmira to a Spanish-Italian aristocratic family. His father, Ramón Delfín, was the Spanish corregidor for trade in Cienfuegos (by Royal Decree of 1898), and the consular representative for the Kingdom of Italy. His brother Ramón María Delfín wrote the novel "La Gloria de la Familia" ("The Glory of the Family"). In Cienfuegos, Eusebio was trained as an accountant, hoping he could build a career in finance. He eventually became the director of the Banco Comercial, and married Amalia Bacardi y Cape, daughter of rum-magnate Emilio Bacardí, senator and mayor of Santiago de Cuba. Their only child, Eusebio Delfín y Bacardí, was the president of Compañía Cubana de Aviación until the Cuban Revolution.

== Musical legacy ==
Delfín studied violin and flute, but soon switched to guitar and song. His guitar teacher was Fernando Barrios, and his singing coach was Vincente Sánchez Torralba. He also studied guitar and song, and sang in public for the first time in 1916 at a charitable venue held at the Terry Theatre in Cienfuegos.

Beginning in 1921, he recorded many Cuban songs, both solo and in duets with partners such as Rita Montaner. The first 78 rpm with Montaner was Pensamiento (by Rafael Gómez, 'Teofilito'). In 1922 he organised, with Eduardo Sánchez de Fuentes, concerts of typical Cuban music in Havana and Cienfuegos. A relatively wealthy man, Delfín donated much of his royalties to charity in Cienfuegos.

According to Guyún, Delfin was responsible for changing the style used to accompany boleros. In the 1920s, boleros were often accompanied by guitar in rayado or rasgueado manner (~strumming); Delfin changed that to a semi-arpeggio style (~picking). He also repeated the rhythm by time and a half, leaving the weak part of the second beat silent. His style became widely popular. His compositions include poetry put to music, such as La Guinda, from a poem by Pedro Mata, and he also wrote his own lyrics, such as ¿Y Tú Qué Has Hecho? (aka En El Tronco De Un Árbol.), Ansia and Qué Boca La Tuya

At the soirées of the rich he sang boleros, with the result that the wealthy young became enthusiastic about the guitar.

His best-known classic, ¿Y Tú Qué Has Hecho? appeared in the 1997 Buena Vista Social Club debut album, considered one of the most important musical albums of all time, according to Rolling Stone Magazine. According to her own account, the same song was being sung by Celia Cruz when discovered.
