= Los Zafiros =

Cuban close-harmony vocal group

- Origin: Havana, Cuba
- Genres: Filín, doo-wop
- Years active: 1962–1976
- Label: Ibersound

Los Zafiros (The Sapphires) were a Cuban close-harmony vocal group working from 1962 until 1976. The group was part of the filín (feeling) movement, inspired by American doo-wop groups such as The Platters. Their music was a fusion of Cuban genres, such as the bolero, with doo-wop, ballads, R&B, calypso, Bossa Nova and early rock and roll.

== Background ==
Los Zafiros were formed in Cayo Hueso, Havana in 1962, by Miguel Ángel Cancio Soria, with the following members:

- Leoncio Morúa (Kike)
- Miguel Cancio (Miguelito) (Founder and first Director)
- Ignacio Elejalde, a counter-tenor, in high register.
- Eduardo Elio Hernández (El Chino)
- Oscar Aguirre (de Fontana) (first guitar and composer).
- later, Manuel Galbán (guitar) became musical director, and at times Oscar Aguirre (guitar) substituted.
- last guitarist was Máximo Armenteros.

The group was highly successful from the start, with high record sales and popular tours at home and abroad. The group made an appearance on the Morecambe and Wise Christmas show in 1971. However, some members of the group were self-destructive and undisciplined, with heavy drinking and other activities. Two died young: Ignacio died in 1981 at the age of 40 from a brain hemorrhage. Kike died in 1983 from cirrhosis of the liver. El Chino, beset by vision, speech and drinking problems, lived alone in Cayo Hueso until his death on 8 August 1995 at age 56. Today only one member is alive, Miguel Cancio, who lives in Miami and also Oscar Aguirre the first guitar player and Máximo Armenteros, the last guitar player.

Manuel Galbán and his wife lived in the same house in Havana as in the heyday of Los Zafiros, until he died of cardiac arrest on July 7, 2011. He was active on the Cuban music scene through his work in The Buena Vista Social Club and as a recording artist for World Circuit records. In 2001, World Circuit arranged a special recording session for Galbán and Cancio at EGREM. Along with Orlando Lopez (Cachaito), Roberto Garcia and Bernardo Garcia (Chori), Cancio and Galbán recorded two of their old songs. This session plays a central role in the film and marks the first time that Galbán and Cancio recorded together in over thirty years.

== Career ==
In 1967, the group had their Mirame Fijo album released on Ibersound IB 595. The tracks on side one were, "Puchunguita Ven", "Rumba Como Quiera", "Y Sabes Bien", "Madureira Schoro", "Mi Oracion" and "Cuando Yo La". And on side two the tracks were, "Mirame Fijo", "Is Estoy Alla", "Si Corazon", "Bossa Cubana", "Mi Amor Perdoname" and Bellecita">

In 1987 a revival group known as Los Nuevos Zafiros was formed by Mariano Suárez del Villar, supported by Eduardo El Chino. They toured for years with some success.

== Discography ==
- Mas De Los Zafiros LP (19??, Areito – LPA 3268)
- Bossa Cubana CD (1963–1967, re-released 1999)
- Los Zafiros Story CD (2006)
- Los Zafiros: Music from the edge of time. DVD
