= Roberto Faz =

- Birth name: Roberto Faz Monzón
- Born: September 18, 1914; Regla, Havana, Cuba
- Died: April 26, 1966 (aged 51); Havana, Cuba
- Genres: Son montuno, guaracha, bolero, guaguancó
- Occupation(s): Musician, bandleader
- Instrument: Vocals
- Years active: 1927-1966
- Labels: Puchito, Seeco, Panart
- Formerly of: Hermanos Palau, Hermanos Lebatard, Conjunto Kubavana, Conjunto Casino

Roberto Faz Monzón (September 18, 1914 – April 26, 1966) was a Cuban singer who reached the height of his popularity during the 1950s and early 1960s. Like his contemporary Benny Moré, he specialized in many forms of Cuban music such as son, guaracha and bolero. He was a member of the Conjunto Kubavana for three years before joining the Conjunto Casino in 1944. At the Casino he sang alongside Agustín Ribot and Roberto Espí, achieving great success. In 1956 he left the Casino to establish his own conjunto, where he sang with Orlando Reyes and Roeangel Rodríguez "Rolito". He continued to tour and record with his band until his death in 1966 from a stroke and edema pulmonary.

== Compositions ==
Faz is the author of popular songs such as "Te traigo mi son", "El pregón de la montaña", "Nadie baila como yo", "El retozón", "Píntate los labios María, del Compositor, Ramon Castro Herrera" and "Aguanile mai mai".
