= Kako (musician) =

Puerto Rican percussionist and bandleader

- Born: Francisco Ángel Bastar Ramos; June 21, 1936; Santurce, San Juan, Puerto Rico
- Died: July 29, 1994 (aged 58) New York City, New York, US
- Genres: Salsa; guaguancó; descarga; bolero
- Occupations: Musician; bandleader; songwriter
- Instruments: Timbales; bongos; congas
- Years active: 1959–1980s
- Labels: Alegre; Musicor; Gema; TR; Artol

Francisco Ángel Bastar Ramos (June 21, 1936 – July 29, 1994), known as Kako, was a Puerto Rican percussionist and bandleader. He is considered one of the most important timbaleros of the incipient salsa of New York City in the 1960s, especially due to his long-lasting association with Alegre Records.

== Career ==
Born on June 21, 1936, in Obrero, a barrio of Santurce, San Juan, Puerto Rico, Kako started his career as a dancer and later as a percussionist in the bands of Arsenio Rodríguez and Tito Puente, among others. In 1961, he recorded and released his debut album for Alegre Records, Kako y su Combo, Vol 1, which was followed by Vol. 2 in 1962. These were followed by Puerto Rican All-Stars (1963) and Tributo a Noro (1964).

Kako was a member of the Alegre All-Stars (and its spin-off Cesta All-Stars) and recorded with Alegre Records music director and pianist Charlie Palmieri. His important role in the group was reflected in songs like Estoy buscando a Kako and Kako y Palmieri. He also performed on some of the most critically acclaimed Latin music recordings of the 1960s, including Mon Rivera's Qué gente averiguá, Mongo Santamaría's Watermelon Man and Celia Cruz's Son con guaguancó. In the late 1960s, he switched to Musicor for the LPs Sock It to Me Latino (1968) and Live It Up (1969). In the 1970s, he collaborated with Rafael Cortijo, Meñique, Totico and Azuquita. He also worked with Ismael Rivera, Willie Colón and Mon Rivera, and took part in the 1977 Alegre All-Stars reunion.

He died from a heart attack in New York City on July 29, 1994. His son, Richie Bastar, is bongosero of El Gran Combo de Puerto Rico.
