= Estrellas de Areito =

Estrellas de Areito (The Stars of Areito) was an ensemble involving over thirty of Cuba's musicians, including Rubén González, Richard Egües, Nino Rivera, Félix Chappotín, Miguelito Cuní, Pío Leyva, Arturo Sandoval, Tata Güines and Paquito D'Rivera.

Formed in 1979, the Estrellas explored the roots of Afro-Cuban music, with many of their tracks lasting over ten minutes. They produced a series of five albums for the Cuban state recording company Egrem.

== Discography ==
- Los Heroes (1998, from 1979 recordings)
  - "Pongase Para Las Cosas"
  - "Hasta Pantojo Baila Mi Son"
  - "Que Traigan El Guaguanco"
  - "Mi Amanecer Campesino"
  - "Llora Timbero"
  - "Yo Si Como Candella"
  - "Fefita"
  - "Guaguancó A Todos Los Barrios"
  - "El Pregón De La Montaña"
  - "U-La-La"
  - "Guajira Guántanamera"
  - "Para Mi Cuba Yo Traigo Un Son"
  - "Prepara Los Cueros"
  - "Maracaíbo Oriental"
