= Guyún =

Cuban classical guitarist (1908–1987)

Vicente González Rubiera (27 October 1908 – 29 September 1987), better known as Guyún, was an influential Cuban guitarist, harmonist and teacher, who tapped into classical guitar techniques to revive the accompaniment of the trova. He achieved the finest transcriptions for guitar.

Born on 27 October 1908 in Santiago de Cuba, Guyún originally came to Havana to study medicine, but finding the university shut under Gerardo Machado, he started playing the guitar to earn a living. He started studying guitar under Sindo Garay, and later understudied Severino López, who had an excellent classical training in the Tárrega–Pujol tradition in Spain. Guyún developed a modern concept of harmony, and a way to apply classical technique to popular Cuban music. He became more adventurous, yet still in Cuban vein, and in 1938 stopped performing to devote himself to teaching the guitar. This bore fruit, and two generations of Cuban guitarists bear witness to his influence. He wrote a valuable book, La guitarra: su técnica y armonía, and two unpublished works: Diccionario de acordes and Un nuevo panorama de la modulación y su técnica. He was highly praised by Andrés Segovia, on a visit to Cuba, and held various teaching posts. One of his students was the great tresero Niño Rivera (Andrés Echevarría).

Guyún died 29 September 1987 in Havana.
