= Antonio María Romeu =

Cuban pianist, composer and bandleader (1876–1955)

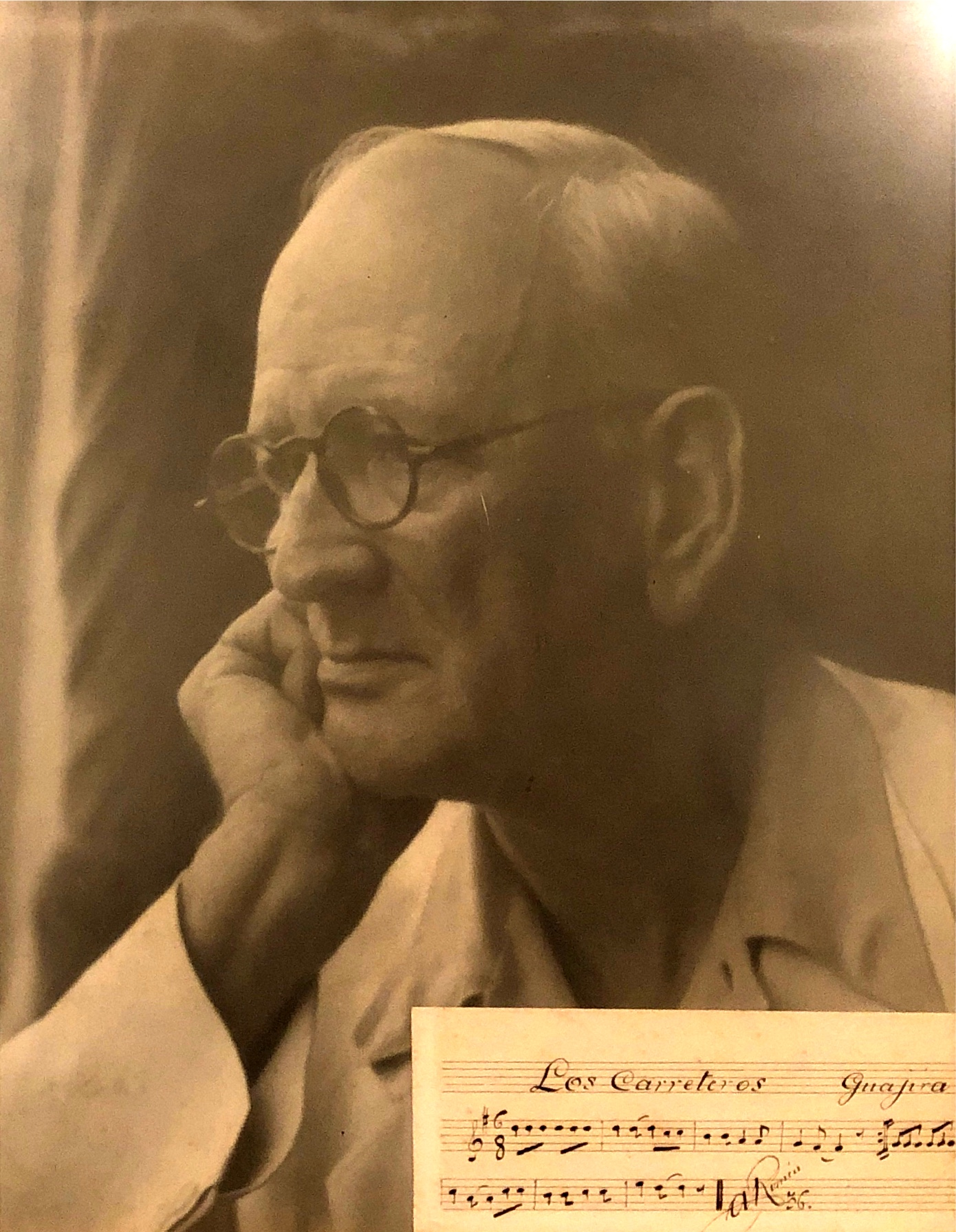

Background information
- Born: Antonio María Romeu Marrero; September 11, 1876; Jibacoa, Cuba
- Died: January 18, 1955 (aged 78) Havana, Cuba
- Genres: Danzón
- Occupations: Musician, bandleader, composer, arranger
- Instrument: Piano
- Label: Panart
- Formerly of: Orquesta Cervantes

Antonio María Romeu Marrero (11 September 1876 – 18 January 1955) was a Cuban pianist, composer and bandleader. His orchestra was Cuba's leading charanga for over thirty years, specializing in the danzón. Throughout his career he was known as El Mago de las Teclas (“The Keyboard Magician”).

== Life and career ==
Romeu studied music in 1884 with Joaquín Mariano Martínez and practiced piano at a local church in Jibacoa. At twelve he played his first dance and composed his first piece. In 1899 he moved to Havana and performed in cafés, later joining the Orquesta Cervantes — one of the earliest charangas founded at the start of the 1900s. These new ensembles, pitched brighter than the típicas, replaced brass with flute and added the new pailas criollas (now timbales). Orquesta Cervantes was the first charanga known to include piano.

In 1910 he founded his own orchestra. Its initial line-up featured Romeu (piano), Feliciano Facenda (violin), Alfredo Valdés (flute), Rafael Calazán (double bass), Remigio Valdés (timbales) and Juan de la Merced (güiro). By the 1920s the group had expanded considerably and included his son Antonio María Romeu Jr. on violin. In the 1930s it briefly functioned as a big band (“jazzband”). During World War II, tourism declined and the band contracted again.

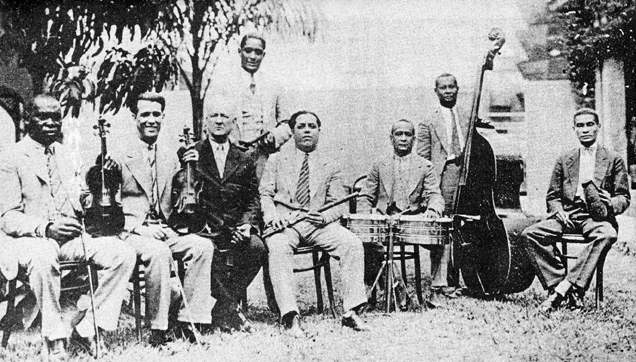
Orquesta Romeu with Romeu (dark suit) and Fernando Collazo, late 1920s

By 1927, vocalists were added to the danzón. Romeu’s ensemble featured Fernando Collazo and later Barbarito Díez (1935 onward). He maintained racially integrated bands throughout his career — a Cuban tradition since the 19th century.

After Romeu’s death in 1955, his orchestra was directed by his son Antonio María Romeu Jr., then by Barbarito Díez. It continued performing traditional danzón as the Orquesta de Barbarito Díez.

== Compositions ==
Romeu wrote and arranged over 500 danzones, many re-worked for other genres. His best-known composition was Tres lindas cubanas, based on a son cubano by guitarist Guillermo Castillo and popularized by the Sexteto Habanero. Other favorites include Siglo XX, La danza de los millones, Cinta azul, El mago de las teclas, and Jibacoa. He also arranged songs by Sindo Garay, Rosendo Ruiz, Manuel Corona, Eusebio Delfín, and Manuel Luna, as well as adaptations of classical works by Mozart and Rossini.
