= Ramón S. Sabat =

- Born: 1902; San Fernando de Camarones, Cienfuegos
- Died: March 15, 1986 (aged 83–84)
- Spouse: Julia Sabat

Ramón S. Sabat (1902 – March 15, 1986) was a musician and the Cuban founder of the pioneering record label Panart, which he established in 1944, eventually gaining international sale of its releases. He had studied music in the United States as a youth, serving in the U.S. Army in one of its bands, and completing his undergraduate degree in engineering at New York University. He returned to Cuba where he worked in recording.

After the Cuban Revolution, Sabat sent his wife and children to the United States, ultimately joining them. He settled in Miami and founded another record company.

== Biography ==
Ramón S. Sabat was born in San Fernando de Camarones, Cienfuegos, Cuba in 1902. At an early age he started showing his musical inclinations and talent. He studied music with José Rivero Rodríguez and learned to play the clarinet, the saxophone, the flute, and the piano. In 1919, Ramón moved to the United States to study music. While in the United States, Ramón enlisted into the U.S. Army and worked in one of the Army's bands.

After Ramón served the U.S. Army, he attended New York University, graduating with a degree in engineering. Sabat worked in different music labels and started various business ventures. In 1944, he opened the first record factory in Cuba, called Panart, and released its first recording, "Dry Leaf" by Carlos Alas del Casino. Panart had a tough time getting started due to RCA Victor’s dominant position in the record market and the relatively new character of the record technology at the time. Sabat’s business abilities and musical vision developed Panart as a successful label. By 1957, Ramón had been able to expand his label and had sold around a million records worldwide. Panart helped spread Cuban music throughout the world.

As the Cuban Revolution began, Ramon's wife (and by then, Panart vice president) Julia Sabat sent copies of master tapes to New York City. She was able to save about eighty percent of Panart’s catalogue. Sabat did not want to leave his record company, so he sent his two daughters and wife to the United States. Julia devised a scheme to get Sabat out of Cuba and into the United States before all doors closed. In 1961, Castro’s regime took over Panart and nationalized it.

Julia and Sabat settled in Miami. Julia started a record factory in Hialeah with Sabat’s brother Galo. Though the record label was not as successful as Panart, the music produced was bought by Cuban refugees, who wanted to be reminded of the good times before Cuba fell into communist hands.

Ramón died from a heart aneurysm on March 15, 1986, in Miami, Florida. He was buried in Our Lady of Mercy Cemetery in Miami, where his gravestone, adorned with a treble clef, reads "Así cantaba Cuba / That's How Cuba Sang".
