= Tata Güines =

Cuban percussionist (1930–2008)

- Born: Federico Arístides Soto Alejo; June 30, 1930; Güines, Cuba
- Died: February 4, 2008 (aged 77) Havana, Cuba
- Genres: Descarga; son; rumba; jazz
- Occupation: Musician
- Instrument: Conga
- Years active: 1950–2008
- Labels: Seeco; Panart; EGREM
- Formerly of: Cachao; Frank Emilio Flynn; Merceditas Valdés; Alfredo Rodríguez; Estrellas de Areito; Angá Díaz; Cubanismo

Federico Arístides Soto Alejo (June 30, 1930 – February 4, 2008), better known as Tata Güines, was a Cuban percussionist, bandleader and arranger. He was widely regarded as a master of the conga drum, and alongside Carlos "Patato" Valdés, influential in the development of contemporary Afro-Cuban music, including Afro-Cuban jazz. He specialized in a form of improvisation known as descarga, a format in which he recorded numerous albums throughout the years with Cachao, Frank Emilio Flynn, Estrellas de Areito, Alfredo Rodríguez and Jane Bunnett, among others. In the 1990s he released two critically acclaimed albums as a leader: Pasaporte and Aniversario. His composition "Pa' gozar" has become a standard of the descarga genre.

== Life and career ==
=== Early years ===
Arístides Soto was born in Güines, a town east of Havana in the former province of Havana in Cuba, on June 30, 1930. He grew up with his parents and his seven siblings, leaving school after year 4 to work as a shoeshiner and paperboy. His mother, María de los Ángeles Soto, took care of the house, while his father José Alejo Vasallo "Joseíto" was a cane worker. He was exposed to music from a young age; Joseíto played the tres in the Sexteto Partagás and used to jam with Arsenio Rodríguez, who lived nearby. Tata made his first bongó-like drums out of a sausage jar and a carton of milk in order to join them on percussion. He taught himself the conga by listening to recordings on the radio and playing at concerts, balls and jam sessions as an amateur. He played in his father's group, as well as in Las Estrellas Nacientes, directed by his uncle Dionisio. He considered Chano Pozo el maestro (the master) and had the opportunity to play with him; Chano encouraged him and Tata never forgot the experience.

=== Success ===
In 1946, Arsenio offered him the opportunity to move to Havana to join Estrellas Juveniles, his side-project. Tata accepted and very soon found himself playing in other bands such as Sonora Matancera and Conjunto Jóvenes del Cayo. He made his first recordings in 1951 as part of Estrellas Juveniles. In 1953, he joined Fajardo y sus Estrellas. He began playing two congas instead of one, an innovation he devised with fellow conguero Carlos "Patato" Valdés, who played with the Conjunto Casino at the time. With Fajardo, Tata played in Caracas, Venezuela, in 1956. The next year he took part in the recording of Cachao's Cuban Jam Sessions in Miniature; he even doubled on bass on one track with Cachao on piano. He then moved to New York City for two years, performing at the Waldorf Astoria and various nightclubs including Birdland, where he shared the stage with jazz musicians such as Dizzy Gillespie, Maynard Ferguson and Miles Davis. He also played with Josephine Baker and Frank Sinatra.

Güines returned to Cuba in 1959 after Fidel Castro came to power in the Cuban Revolution which he helped fund by contributions from his earnings as a musician. He then joined the Quinteto Instrumental de Música Moderna, a pioneering jazz combo founded by drummer Guillermo Barreto and pianist Frank Emilio Flynn. He remained a member of Flynn's band for many years, under the name Los Amigos. In the 1960s, Güines recorded several sessions as a leader for EGREM under the monikers Tata Güines y sus Tatagüinitos, and Tata Güines y sus Ases del Ritmo. His first hit with the Tatagüinitos was "Perico, no llores más". He also backed Merceditas Valdés throughout the 1960s and later in the 1980s. In 1979, he took part in the Estrellas de Areito sessions and in the recording of Intercambio cultural by Típica 73. In 1981, he recorded an LP entitled Descarga featuring Bobby Carcassés, as well as Descarga en Kawama.

=== Later years ===
In the 1990s, he toured internationally and recorded with many artists including pianist Alfredo Rodríguez, Peruchín Jr., Orlando "Maraca" Valle, Jesús Alemañy's Cubanismo and Hilario Durán. He recorded with the young conguero Anga Díaz, considered one of his main disciples, on the 1994 record Pasaporte, which won the EGREM Album of the Year award. On 1994 he recorded Aniversario as a leader. He collaborated with Jane Bunnett on Chamalongo (1997) and Cuban Odyssey (2002), and appeared on the documentary Spirits of Havana, which chronicles the recording of Cuban Odyssey. In 2003 he played on the Latin Grammy-winning Lágrimas negras with pianist Bebo Valdés and Spanish flamenco singer Diego El Cigala. In 2006, he was awarded the Premio Nacional de Música, the highest honor given to musicians in Cuba.

In 2007, he recorded Piano y ritmo with Cuban Jazz Legends; the album was released posthumously in 2010. Tata Güines died in Havana on February 4, 2008.

== Influences ==
When asked about his teachers, Tata always responded that he "had no teachers, only the streets to learn, and the radio". He claimed that his biggest influence was Chano Pozo.

== Discography ==
- 1981: Descarga (Discos Fuentes)
- 1994: Pasaporte (EGREM) – with Angá Díaz
- 1995: Aniversario (EGREM)
