= Joseíto Fernández =

Cuban singer and songwriter (1908–1979)

José Fernández Díaz
- Born: 5 September 1908; Los Sitios neighborhood of Central Havana, Cuba
- Died: 11 October 1979 (aged 71) Havana, Cuba
- Occupations: Singer, songwriter
- Label: Puchito

José Fernández Díaz (5 September 1908 – 11 October 1979), commonly known as Joseíto Fernández, was a Cuban singer and songwriter. He is the writer of well-known songs, including "Elige tú, que canto yo", "Amor de madre", "Demuéstrame tú", and "Así son, boncó", as well as the most famous "Guajira Guantanamera".

== Selected compositions ==
- "Tu Misma Me Acostumbraste", Joseíto Fernández (words & music)
- "Mi Madre y Mi Tierra", Joseíto Fernández (words & music)
- "Guajira Guantanamera", Joseíto Fernández (words & music), based on a poem by José Martí © 1960
- "Los Babilonios", Joseíto Fernández (words), Ernesto Pérez (es) (music)
- "Elige Tú, Que Canto Yo", Joseíto Fernández (words & music) © 1959
- "Así Son, Boncó", Joseíto Fernández (words & music) © 1960
