= Walfredo de los Reyes =

Cuban musician and educator (1933–2025)

Walfredo de los Reyes Sr.
- Born: Walfredo de los Reyes III; June 16, 1933; Havana, Cuba
- Died: August 28, 2025 (aged 92) Concord, California, U.S.
- Genres: Latin jazz, descarga
- Occupations: Musician, music educator, clinician
- Instruments: Timbales, drums
- Label: Gema

Walfredo de los Reyes III (June 16, 1933 – August 28, 2025), known professionally as Walfredo de los Reyes Sr., was a Cuban drummer, timbalero, percussionist, and educator, in the fields of session recording, live performance, and clinics. Inspired by Candido Camero he was instrumental in advancing the use of multiple percussion (congas, timbales, bongó) all played simultaneously by just one player. He was the father of famed percussionists Walfredo Reyes Jr. and Daniel de los Reyes and of actor Kamar de los Reyes. He is often cited as one of the most influential modern timbaleros together with Tito Puente and Willie Bobo.

== Life and career ==
Walfredo de los Reyes III was born on June 16, 1933 in Havana, his trumpeter father was named Walfredo de los Reyes II, also a well known musician. To distinguish the two during their mutually active career span from the 1940s through the early 1960s, his father was originally published as Walfredo de los Reyes Sr. and he as Walfredo de los Reyes Jr. With the senior's retirement, and the onset of his own son's career, he then became published as the new Walfredo de los Reyes Sr. and his son as Walfredo Reyes Jr. (natively Walfredo de los Reyes Palau IV).

Citing Louie Bellson and Buddy Rich as musical influences, he performed or recorded with artists including Josephine Baker, Cachao, Elena Burke, La Lupe, Julio Gutiérrez, Quarteto Las D'Aida, Louie Bellson, Paquito Hechavarría, Bobby Darin, Dionne Warwick, Juliet Prowse, and Debbie Reynolds.

De los Reyes died in Concord, California on August 28, 2025, at the age of 92.

== Discography ==
- Cuban Jazz (1960, Gema).
- San Rafael 500 (2001; featuring Walfredo Reyes Sr., Walfredo Reyes Jr., Kamar de los Reyes, Rafael de los Reyes, Karen Briggs, Pedro Eustache)

== Equipment ==
Walfredo Reyes Sr. carries the following endorsements:

- Regal Tip Nylon cap 7/16" 176NT
- Sabian cymbals
