= Generoso Jiménez =

- Also known as: Tojo
- Born: Generoso Jiménez García; July 17, 1917; Cruces, Cienfuegos, Cuba
- Died: September 15, 2007 (aged 90) Coral Gables, Florida, U.S.

Generoso Jiménez García (July 17, 1917 – September 15, 2007), commonly known as Tojo, was a Cuban trombonist, bandleader and arranger. He was a member of Beny Moré's Banda Gigante and a frequent collaborator of musicians in the descarga scene such as Cachao. Producer Nat Chediak described Tojo as "the father of the creole trombone".

In 1939, together with flautist Efraín Loyola and violinist Gilberto La Rosa, he founded the Orquesta Rítmica. He stayed in Cuba after Fidel Castro took over the government in 1959, and recorded in 1965 El trombón majadero, considered a classic in Cuban music. He later fell out of favor with the Cuban government, stopped playing the trombone, and became a roaming street vendor.

In 2001, he composed, arranged and directed a new album Generoso qué bueno toca usted, featuring a lineup with 27 musicians including Paquito D'Rivera and Arturo Sandoval. In 2003, he was allowed to attend the Grammy ceremony in New York City following the nomination of the album for the Best Traditional Tropical Latin Album category. A few months later he returned to the United States and settled in Florida. He picked up his trombone and his career was reborn. His last recording was for Gloria Estefan's album 90 Millas, released in 2007.

== Discography ==
- 1957: Ritmo (Kubaney)
- 1960: El danzón con Generoso y su danzonera (Seeco)
- 1965: El trombón majadero (Areito)
- 2001: Generoso qué bueno toca usted (Pimienta)

== See also ==
- Raimundo Valenzuela
