= Julio Gutiérrez (musician) =

Cuban music director, pianist, composer and arranger (1918–1990)

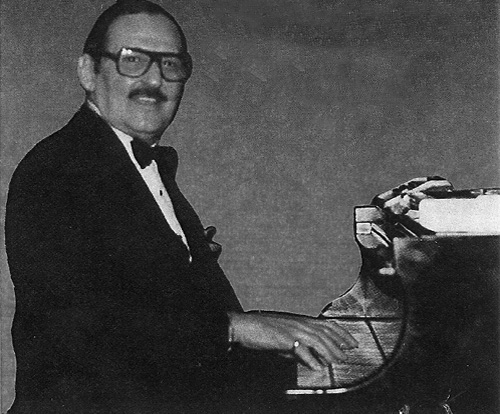
- Julio Gutiérrez on piano.

Background information
- Born: Julio César Gutiérrez Cainas; January 12, 1918; Manzanillo, Oriente, Cuba
- Died: December 15, 1990 (aged 72) New York City, New York, United States
- Genres: Big band, mambo, cha cha cha, descarga
- Occupations: Music director, musician, composer, arranger
- Instruments: Piano, vibraphone, keyboards, organ
- Labels: Panart, Sirena, Montilla, Gema, Neon, Toboga

Julio Gutiérrez (January 12, 1918 – December 15, 1990) was a Cuban music director, pianist, composer and arranger. He was one of the main figures in the music scene of Havana in the 1940s and 1950s, and a pioneer of the descarga (Cuban jam session). As a songwriter, he is remembered for his 1944 bolero "Inolvidable", which has been performed by numerous artists.

== Biography ==
Born in Manzanillo (in the current Granma Province) on January 12, 1918, Julio Gutiérrez learned to play the violin and to sing at a very young age. He was six years old when he learned the piano, and fourteen when he founded a local band and became its director. In 1940, Orquesta Casino de la Playa was touring the east of Cuba and Miguelito Valdés suggested him to go to Havana where he could thrive as a musician. Months later he moved to the capital, where he became the pianist of Casino de la Playa and composed several hit songs such as the bolero "Inolvidable".

In 1948, he formed his own big band with which he toured Latin America and Spain. This group which was RHC-Cadena Azul's resident band, included prominent musicians such as Alejandro "El Negro" Vivar, Edilberto Escrich, Nilo Argudín, Emilio Peñalver, Rogelio Darias, and Óscar Valdés Sr. After returning to Cuba from his long tour in 1950, Gutiérrez began composing bolero-mambos and cha-cha-chas. He was appointed musical director of the Channel 4 television, and he accompanied vocal acts such as Rita Montaner, Rosita Fornés, Lucy Fabery, Olga Rivero, Cuarteto Faxas, Dúo Cabrisas-Farach and Omara Portuondo.

In 1956, Panart commissioned him the recording of a "descarga", a jam session of Cuban popular music. Despite being conceived as a very commercial project, Panart's Cuban Jam Sessions under the direction of Julio Gutiérrez, featuring Peruchín on piano and other well-known Cuban musicians, have received widespread critical acclaim. Following his success, artists such as Chico O'Farrill, Cachao and Niño Rivera recorded their own descargas.

In 1960, Julio Gutiérrez fled to México and shortly after he moved to Miami, where he recorded a few LPs for labels such as Sirena and Montilla as a leader; he also backed singer Blanca Rosa Gil. He then spent over 20 years in New York City, recording numerous sessions as a leader, orchestral director and/or pianist. He also founded his own label, J&G. He traveled several times to Puerto Rico, where he played in hotels and nightclubs. He died in New York on December 15, 1990. Gutiérrez was posthumously inducted into the International Latin Music Hall of Fame in 2000.

== Discography ==
- 1956: Este es el ritmo del cha cha chá (Panart) - with Cuarteto Faxas
- 1956: Cha Cha Cha for Moderns (Fiesta del cha cha cha) (Panart; reissued as This Is The Rhythm) - with Cuarteto Faxas
- 1956: Serenata en cha cha chá (Panart) - with Cuarteto Faxas
- 1956: Cuban Jam Session Vol. 1 (Panart)
- 1957: Cuban Jam Session Vol. 2 (Panart)
- 1957: Luna de miel en Venecia (Panart) - with Pino Baratti
- 1959: Así es La Habana! (Panart)
- 1960: Una noche inolvidable (Panart)
- 1964: Julio Gutiérrez Play the Exciting Sound of Havana B.C. (Sirena)
- 1965: Get to Know Mr. J.G. (Montilla)
- 1968: Instrumentales para ti (Gema)
- 1970: Progressive Latin (Gema)
- 1971: Julio Gutiérrez and Los Guajiros (Gema)
- 1978: Close Encounters of the Latin Kind (Neon)
- 1982: Viva América Latina (Toboga)
