= Areito (record label) =

Cuban record label

- Parent company: EGREM
- Founded: 1964
- Defunct: 1996
- Genre: Cuban music
- Country of origin: Cuba
- Location: Calle San Miguel No. 410, Centro Habana, Havana

Areito is a Cuban record label founded in 1964 as the primary imprint of EGREM, which is based in Havana. Areito is named after the recording studio from which the vast majority of its catalog stems, which in turn was named after the Taíno ritual of the same name. The record studio had been established in 1944, originally named Panart studios and was associated with recording engineer Ramón Sabat's Panart record label.

The 1959 government nationalized the Cuban music industry, including the associated studio and record company in 1961. Since the 1960s, Areito/EGREM has been the main music company in Cuba, managing most of the recording, manufacture and distribution of albums, EPs and singles in the country. Areito's counterpart in eastern Cuba is Siboney.

Both imprints, Areito and Siboney, were discontinued by EGREM in 1996. EGREM's studios in Havana are still called Estudios Areito.

== International distribution ==
During the mid to late 1960s, the international distribution of Areito LPs and EPs was handled by Palma, a short-lived imprint organized by EGREM. In the 1970s, Palma was replaced by Guamá, an imprint launched by EGREM to commercialize Cuban music around the world.
