= Pío Leyva =

Cuban musician

- Born: 5 May 1917; Morón, provincia de Ciego de Ávila, Cuba.
- Died: 22 March 2006 (aged 88); Havana, Cuba

Pío Leiva (May 5, 1917 – March 22, 2006) was a Cuban singer and the author of the guaracha El Mentiroso ("The Liar"). Leyva was part of the Buena Vista Social Club, and composed some of Cuba's best known standards.

== Biography ==
Leyva was born as Wilfredo Leiva Pascual in Morón, Cuba in 1917. He won a bongo contest at the age of six and made his singing debut in 1932. He recorded over 25 albums since he signed his first contract with RCA Victor in 1950. Leyva sang with other Cuban artists such as Benny Moré, Bebo Valdés and Noro Morales and was a member of Estrellas de Areito and "Compay Segundo y Sus Muchachos."

Fellow musician Barbarito Torres said of Leyva: "Pio has always been a famous singer in Cuba. I've always admired him, not just for his talent, but because of his great personality. He's the inspiration."

Leyva took part in the 2004 film Música Cubana, which was marketed as a sequel to Buena Vista Social Club.

== Death ==
Leyva died of a heart attack, on March 22, 2006. He was 88 years old.
