= Niño Rivera =

Cuban musician, songwriter and arranger

- Birth name: Andrés Perfecto Eleuterio Goldino Confesor Echevarría Callava
- Born: April 18, 1919 Pinar del Río, Cuba
- Died: January 27, 1996 (aged 76) Havana, Cuba
- Genres: Son cubano, guaracha, bolero, canción, mambo
- Occupation(s): Musician, bandleader, songwriter
- Instrument: tres
- Years active: 1924–1996
- Labels: Panart, EGREM

Andrés Echevarría Callava (April 18, 1919 – January 27, 1996), better known as Niño Rivera, was a renowned Cuban tres player, songwriter and arranger. Early in his career he played with the Sexteto Boloña and Sexteto Bolero, before forming his own conjunto in the 1940s. His music was based on popular Cuban forms such as the son montuno and the chachachá, often with notable jazz influences.

== Biography ==
=== Early life ===
Niño Rivera was born Andrés Perfecto Eleuterio Goldino Confesor Echevarría Callava on April 18, 1919, in Pinar del Río, Cuba. He started playing the bongo in his uncle's band, Sexteto Caridad, when he was only 5 years old. In 1924 his family moved to Havana, where he took up the tres in Sexteto Boloña, alternating with Sexteto Cárdenas. In 1929 he went back to Pinar del Río, where he reorganized the Sexteto Caridad, before returning to Havana in 1934. He learned to master the tres as a student of the classical guitarist Guyún (Vicente González Rubiera) and the arranger Félix Guerrero. In 1935 he replaced Eliseo Silveira in Tata Gutiérrez's Sexteto Bolero, which he would later direct. He often played in Radio Mil Diez. In 1942 he established the Septeto Rey de Reyes, a son septet featuring a harmonic vocal quartet which he directed. At this time, Rivera became part of the nascent filin movement and started working as a composer/arranger.

=== Success ===
Rivera's career improved due to the success of his compositions, especially "El jamaiquino", which he wrote in 1944. In 1949, Rivera became the arranger for Cuba's most successful conjunto, Roberto Espí's Conjunto Casino. In 1956 he traveled to Mexico, where he worked mainly as an arranger. In 1957 he recorded the third Cuban Jam Session for Panart, which included a series of descargas combining son montuno, swing, guajira, chachachá, guaguancó and conga. In 1958 he founded a new group with a notable horn section called "Niño Rivera y su Conjband" which recorded another album for Panart. In the 1960s, Rivera and his band would record for EGREM due to the nationalization of the music industry.

=== Later years ===
In 1979, Rivera took part in the first series of recordings of Areito's all-star ensemble, Estrellas de Areito, which yielded the album Los héroes. A second album followed in 1981.

=== Death and legacy ===
Niño Rivera died on January 27, 1996, in Havana. His daughter, Gloria Rivera, is also a singer and lives in Minnesota. His son Mario, is an internationally beloved saxophonist living in Havana.

== Compositions ==
- "Amor en el festival"
- "Átomo" (1949; co-written with Luis Yáñez)
- "Azúcar con ají"
- "Carnaval del amor"
- "Cherivón"
- "Concierto para tres y orquesta" (1986)
- "Cubibop" (1949)
- "El jamaiquino" (1944)
- "Eres mi felicidad"
- "Fiesta en el cielo"
- "Juan José"
- "Monte adentro"
- "No sé lo que tienes"
- "Nuevo son"
- "Ritmo de juventud"
- "Tú y mi música"
