= Panart =

Cuban record label

- Artwork from a Panart LP sleeve.
- Parent company: Concord
- Founded: 1944
- Founder: Ramón Sabat
- Defunct: May 29, 1961
- Genre: Cuban music
- Country of origin: Cuba
- Location: Calle San Miguel No. 410, Centro Habana, Havana

Panart was one of the first and most successful independent record labels in Cuba, founded in 1944 by engineer Ramón Sabat. In 1961, its studios were seized by Fidel Castro's communist regime and the label was nationalized, becoming "Panart Nacionalizada", which shortly after was absorbed by EGREM.

Together with RCA Victor's, Panart studios were the main recording studios in Cuba during the 1950s. Since the 1960s, they are known as the Areito studios, owned by EGREM. In addition, Panart acted as a distributor for Odeon, Musart, Sonora and Capitol Records. Its only sublabel, Sonoro, was established in 1949 and signed several trova acts such as Los Compadres.

In 2016, Panart was acquired by Concord Bicycle Music (renamed Concord in 2019) as a part of its purchase of Musart. Within Concord, Panart is operated as an imprint of the historical reissue label Craft Recordings.

== History ==
=== Origins and expansion ===
After studying music, joining the army and obtaining a degree in engineering, Ramón Sabat began working in several music labels in New York City. In 1943, the label he was working in, Musicraft, folded, and he decided to bring the necessary assets to Cuba to fulfill his desire of establishing his own Cuban-based record company. Thus in 1944 Sabat became the founder and president of the Cuban Plastics & Record Corporation. According to Irais Huerta Rubio, the majority stockholder of the company was a Cuban electric company controlled by an American holding company. In 1945, the company sold the whole of its shares to Sabat, becoming the sole owner of the company and launching it under the name Panart (sometimes stylized Pan-Art, short for Panamerican Art). His wife, Julia Sabat, became the vice-president, and millionaire Enrique Gorrín became its treasurer. The company's headquarters and recording studios were at San Miguel 410, between Campanario and Lealtad, in Havana, while the pressing plant was located outside of the city.

The first record released by Panart (cat. no. 1001) was a 10" single by Cascarita with the Julio Cueva Orchestra ("Ampárame" / "En el ñongo"). Eight more singles were released in 1944 and 83 in 1945, starting with Orquesta Hermanos Castro "Cucha el eco del tambó" / "Toda una vida" (cat. no. 1010). Although Panart is frequently mentioned as the first independent record label in Cuba, a small label called Star was established a few years prior, recording four songs by the Septeto Nacional in 1940. In 1949, Panart launched Sonoro, a sublabel dedicated to traditional folk music (mainly son in the trova style), including Trío Servando Díaz, Trío Caney, Los Incógnitos, Los Compadres and Compay Segundo in its initial roster.

In 1952, Panart obtained exclusive rights for the pressing of music licensed by Decca. A few years later this contract was broken as Decca reached an agreement with EMI/Capitol. The expansion of the record label was nonetheless unprecedented for a Caribbean label. After establishing a subsidiary (Panart Recording Corporation) in New York in 1952, the same year it pressed its first LPs, Panart was pressing half a million records a year, 20% of which was exported outside of Cuba (over 50% by 1959). Its dominance over the jukebox business in Cuba and the strategic (geographical) advantage over its main competitor, RCA Victor, explain part of Panart's success. Moreover, Panart was able to secure contracts with some of the most popular and innovative musicians and groups in the country, from Conjunto Casino to Julio Gutiérrez and Cachao.

=== Nationalization and aftermath ===
After the Cuban Revolution, Cuban culture, including the record industry, was to be nationalized. Most Cuban record companies either folded or quickly relocated to Florida or Puerto Rico. Panart's fate was somewhat different, on May 29, 1961, its studios and factory were seized by the government. By that time, Ramón and Julia Sabat were already in the US. For a short period of time, until 1962, Panart's records were sold as "Panart Nacionalizada" to reflect this. Between 1962 and 1964, the Imprenta Nacional the Cuba acted as the only legal Cuban label. In 1964, the EGREM "trumpet" logo began to be used in stickers put over the Panart logo of previously released albums, and by the time Areito was founded as EGREM's main imprint in Panart's former facilities, Panart had disappeared from Cuban record stores.

Thanks to Julia Sabat, who sent the master copies from Havana to New York, around 80% of Panart's catalogue was "saved" before the government took over the company. Julia and her daughters then left Havana shortly after the Revolution, while Ramón remained in Cuba in charge of the company. Finally, in 1961, they managed to get Ramón out of Cuba. He and his wife established themselves in Miami. Julia started working in a record factory in Hialeah with Ramón's brother, Galo. Together they issued 1950s recordings made in Cuba on various imprints, including Adria Records and Puchito Records, all manufactured in Hialeah.

== Competition ==
Besides having to compete with major American record labels, primarily RCA Victor (or its subsidiary, Discuba, between 1959 and 1961), and to a lesser extent, Capitol, Panart had to compete with numerous independent Cuban records labels that were established during the 1950s following the success of Sabat's company. These Cuban labels include Puchito, Kubaney, Suaritos, Gema and Maype amongst others.

== Roster ==
- Fernando Albuerne
- Orquesta Almendra
- Orquesta América
- Orquesta América del 55
- Carlos Barbería
- Guillermo Barreto
- Candita Batista
- Alberto Beltrán
- Lino Borges
- Cachaíto
- Cachao
- Orquesta Hermanos Castro
- Compay Segundo
- Conjunto Casino
- Conjunto Chappottín
- Caridad Cuervo
- Barbarito Díez
- Carlos Embale
- Dúo Cabrisas-Farach
- Mary Esquivel
- José Fajardo
- Roberto Faz
- Joseíto Fernández
- Frank Emilio Flynn
- Neno González
- Bienvenido Granda
- Los Guaracheros de Oriente
- Julio Gutiérrez
- Gina Martin
- Obdulio Morales
- Miguel Matamoros
- Ñico Membiela
- Chico O'Farrill
- Armando Oréfiche
- Orquesta Típica Panart
- Mario Patterson y su Orquesta Oriental
- Peruchín
- Orquesta Revé
- Niño Rivera
- Orquesta Riverside
- Orquesta Antonio María Romeu
- Conjunto Rumbavana
- Filiberto Sánchez
- Luis Santí
- Daniel Santos
- Ñico Saquito
- Orquesta Serenata Española
- Sonora Matancera
- Merceditas Valdés
- Orlando Vallejo
- Ramón Veloz
- Alberto Zayas

== See also ==
- List of record labels
