= Filin (music) =

Cuban song genre

Filin (Spanish: filin) was a Cuban, but US–influenced, popular song fashion of the late 1940s to the early 1960s. The word is derived from feeling, and is sometimes spelled filin or even el filin. It describes a style of post-microphone jazz-influenced romantic song (~crooning).

The Cuban roots of filin were in the bolero and the canción. It was related to the trova: in fact, filin was sometimes regarded as a renewal or reinvigoration, of the old trova. Some Cuban quartets, such as Cuarteto d'Aida and Los Zafiros, modelled themselves on U.S. close-harmony groups. Others were singers who had heard Ella Fitzgerald, Sarah Vaughan and Nat King Cole. Filin singers included César Portillo de la Luz, José Antonio Méndez, who spent a decade in Mexico from 1949 to 1959, Frank Domínguez, the blind pianist Frank Emilio Flynn, and the great singers of boleros Elena Burke and the still-performing Omara Portuondo, who both came from the Cuarteto d'Aida.

A house in Havana, where the trovador Tirso Díaz lived, became a meeting-place for singers and musicians interested in filin such as: Luis Yáñez, César Portillo de la Luz, José Antonio Méndez, Niño Rivera, José Antonio Ñico Rojas, Elena Burke, Froilán, Aida Diestro and Frank Emilio Flynn. Here lyricists and singers could meet arrangers, such as Bebo Valdés, El Niño Rivera (Andrés Hechavarria), Peruchín (Pedro Jústiz), and get help to develop their work.

The filin movement, which originally had a place every afternoon on Radio Mil Diez, survived the first few years of the revolution quite well, but somehow did not suit the new circumstances and gradually withered, leaving its roots in jazz, romantic song and the bolero perfectly healthy. Some of its most prominent singers, such as Pablo Milanés, then took up the banner of the nueva trova.

== See also ==
Music of Cuba
