= A Toda Cuba le Gusta =

1997 first album by Afro-Cuban All Stars

Studio album by Afro-Cuban All Stars
- Released: April 9, 1997
- Recorded: March 1996
- Studio: EGREM, Havana, Cuba
- Genre: Guajira; son montuno; danzón; mozambique; son-afro
- Length: 55:43
- Language: Spanish
- Label: World Circuit
- Producer: Juan de Marcos González; Nick Gold

Afro-Cuban All Stars chronology
A Toda Cuba le Gusta (1997)	Distinto, Diferente (1999)

A Toda Cuba le Gusta is the first studio album by the Afro-Cuban All Stars, produced by Cuban bandleader and musician Juan de Marcos González and Nick Gold, and released on April 9, 1997, on World Circuit Records.

This album was the first in a series of three consecutive recordings that took place in early 1996, the subsequent albums being Buena Vista Social Club and Introducing...Rubén González.

== Recording ==
In March 1996, Nick Gold and Juan de Marcos González (previously the tres player of Sierra Maestra) produced A Toda Cuba le Gusta, the first album by the Afro-Cuban All Stars, recorded at the EGREM Studios in Havana and featuring Rubén González (piano), Orlando "Cachaíto" López (bass), along with a big band of veteran Cuban musicians and singers, most of whom had careers that went back to the 1950s Havana scene: Ibrahim Ferrer, Pío Leyva, Manuel "Puntillita" Licea, Raúl Planas, Félix Baloy, and José Antonio "Maceo" Rodríguez. Ry Cooder played slide guitar on "Alto Songo". In the sleeve notes, Juan de Marcos González, who directed the project and played tres, wrote: "This album is dedicated to Rubén González, genius of Cuban piano".

== Critical reception ==
Professional ratings
Review scores
Source	Rating
AllMusic	4/5 stars

The album was reviewed in Folk Roots magazine, issue 169, in July 1997, and by Gary S. Mattingly at amelor.com on August 24, 1998. In his review at AllMusic, Daniel Gioffre stated: "A lively, spontaneous record that manages to sound both relaxed and forceful at the same time, A Toda Cuba Le Gusta shows off the talents of many of Cuba's elder statesmen of Afro-Cuban jazz. Over gently pulsating conga grooves and low-register ostinatos, such luminaries as pianist Rubén González and singer Manuel "Puntillita" Licea float dramatic melodies, as their solo contributions are answered by brass section chords as thick and sweet as cane syrup." The album was mentioned by Jim Macnie in Artists & Music - Jazz Blue Notes, in Billboard (December 27, 1997 - January 3, 1998), and also during a 2000 interview with Juan de Marcos González.

The album reached #9 in the Top World Music Albums charts (Billboard, January 31, 1998) and was nominated for Best Tropical Latin Performance at the 40th Annual Grammy Awards in 1998, but was overshadowed by the Buena Vista Social Club album. In 2009, it was awarded a gold certification from the Independent Music Companies Association, which indicated sales of at least 100,000 copies throughout Europe. By December 1998, the album has sold 250,000 copies worldwide.

== Overview ==
"Amor Verdadero" is a guajira-son written by José "Cheo" Marquetti and arranged following the classical style of the Afro-Cuban Jazz bands from the 1950s such as Riverside and Casino de la Playa. Manuel "Puntillita" Licea is lead vocalist.

"Alto Songo" is a son montuno composed by Luis "Lilí" Martínez and arranged by de Marcos González, bringing together elements of the son montuno and cha-cha-cha. Four generations of singers are represented in Raúl Planas, Pío Leyva, Manuel "Puntillita" Licea and José Antonio "Maceo" Rodriguez. Rubén González delivers a piano solo and Cooder plays slide guitar.

"Habana del Este" is a danzonete-chá written by de Marcos González in homage to Havana's region along the east coast from Matanzas. The danzonete form was created by Matancero composer Aniceto Díaz as a variation on the danzón. The flute is played by Richard Egües, ex-soloist with the Orquesta Aragón, and de Marcos González plays a tres solo.

"A Toda Cuba le Gusta" is a son composed by Remberto Becquer and arranged by de Marcos González in a new version blending elements of son, mambo and mozambique. Lead vocalist is Raúl Planas, who sang in the 1950s with Sonora Matancera, Conjunto Rumbavana, Celia Cruz, and others.

"Fiesta de la Rumba" is a collage of various traditional Cuban guaguancós with the tres taking the lead as a homage to Arsenio Rodríguez. Lead vocalist is Félix Baloy and backing vocals from all the other singers and musicians.

"Los Sitio' Asere" is a guaguancó-son written by Silvio Pino in homage to Los Sitio', a barrio in Havana famous for its nightlife and fiestas in the 1940s and '50s. The orchestration follows the school of Luis "Lilí" Martínez and Arsenio Rodríguez. Lead vocalist is Félix Baloy, who sang with Cuban son bands such as Conjunto Chappottín, Orquesta Revé, Adalberto Álvarez and Miguelito Cuní. Sharing the lead is José Antonio "Maceo" Rodriguez, lead singer in Sierra Maestra since the 1980s.

"Pío Mentiroso" is a guaracha composed by Miguel Ojeda and re-arranged by de Marcos González, who added new material in the form of two montunos and two mambos, written for three trumpets. Pío Leyva is lead vocalist and Manuel "Guajiro" Mirabal plays a trumpet solo.

"Maria Caracoles" is a new version of the well-known 1950s mozambique, written by Pío Leyva & Pedro "Pello El Afrokán" Izquierdo, and arranged by José Manuel Ceruto. Lead vocals are by Ibrahim Ferrer.

"Clasiqueando con Rubén" was composed by de Marcos González as an experiment mixing baroque with tropical dance music, following the principles of Haydn and Bach and arranged to the canons of son. Rubén González leads on piano, with participation from the brass and rhythm section, and a Cuban crescendo with contributions from trombone and congas.

"Elube Changó" is a son-afro composed by Alberto Rivero as a praise song to the Santería gods. It is sung in the Yoruba language by de Marcos González, who also plays tres solos. Manuel "Guajiro" Mirabal (trumpet), Demetrio Muñiz (trombone) and Miguel "Angá" Díaz (congas) also deliver solos. The tempo is upbeat, within the rhythm known in Cuba as timba.

== Track listing ==
1. "Amor Verdadero" (José "Cheo" Marquetti) – 6:38
2. "Alto Songo" (Luis "Lilí" Martínez) – 6:46
3. "Habana del Este" (Juan de Marcos González) – 6:39
4. "A Toda Cuba le Gusta" (Remberto Becquer/Juan de Marcos González) – 5:48
5. "Fiesta de la Rumba" (Traditional) – 5:53
6. "Los Sitio' Asere" (Silvio Pino, arr. Juan de Marcos González) – 5:20
7. "Pío Mentiroso" (Miguel Ojeda) – 4:37
8. "Maria Caracoles" (Pío Leyva) – 4:48
9. "Clasiqueando con Rubén" (Juan de Marcos González) – 5:12
10. "Elube Changó" (Alberto Rivero) – 4:02

== Personnel ==
=== Musicians ===
- Juan de Marcos González – leader, tres, claves, vocals
- Rubén González – piano
- Orlando "Cachaito" Lopez – bass
- Manuel "Guajiro" Mirabal – trumpet
- Luis Alemañy – trumpet
- Daniel Ramos – trumpet
- Carlos "El Afrokán" Álvarez – trombone
- Demetrio Muñiz – arranger, trombone
- Javier Zalba – flute, sax (baritone)
- Miguel "Angá" Díaz – congas
- Julienne Oviedo Sánchez – timbales
- Carlos González – bongos
- Alberto Virgilio Valdés – chorus, maracas
- Carlos Puisseaux – güiro

=== Guest musicians ===
- Ry Cooder – slide guitar on "Alto Songo"
- Richard Egües – flute on "Habana del Este"
- Barbarito Torres – laúd on "Amor Verdadero"

=== Singers ===
- Ibrahim Ferrer – vocals
- Pío Leyva – composer, vocals
- Manuel "Puntillita" Licea – vocals, chorus
- Raúl Planas – vocals
- Félix Baloy – vocals
- José Antonio "Maceo" Rodríguez – vocals
- Luis Barzaga – chorus

=== Production ===
- Juan de Marcos González – producer, composer, arranger, director, lyrics transcription, song notes
- Nick Gold – producer
- Jerry Boys – engineer, mixing
- Dave Bernez – mastering
- Duncan Cowell – mastering
- Jenny Adlington – translation
- Francesca Clarke – translation
- Cristina Piza – photography
- Kathryn Samson – cover design

== See also ==
- 1997 in Latin music
- Music of Cuba

== Bibliography ==
- Nathan Brackett, Christian Hoard (2004). The New Rolling Stone Album Guide: Completely Revised and Updated 4th Edition. Simon and Schuster. ISBN 0-7432-0169-8.
