= Raúl Planas =

- Born: Enrique Raúl Planas Fernández; September 18, 1920; Camajuaní, Villa Clara, Cuba
- Died: February 28, 2001 (aged 80) Havana, Cuba
- Genres: Son, bolero
- Occupation: Musician
- Years active: 1933–2001
- Labels: EGREM

Enrique Raúl Planas Fernández (September 18, 1920 – February 28, 2001) was a popular Cuban singer and songwriter. He performed and recorded with many bands and musicians, including Carlos Barbería y su Orquesta Kubavana, Sonora Matancera, Celia Cruz, Conjunto Rumbavana, Conjunto Chappottín, Charanga Rubalcaba, Rubén González, and the Afro-Cuban All Stars.

== Early life ==
Raúl Planas was born in Camajuaní, Villa Clara province, Cuba on September 18, 1920. (Note: Raúl Planas's date of birth is disputed. In the sleeve notes from the album Para Todos Los Tiempos (2002), musicologist Gabe Romero wrote that Planas was born on September 18, 1920. Some sources mention an imprecise birth date of "1933" which, if Romero is correct, would be the year when Planas is reputed to have started his singing career at the age of thirteen. Other sources mention a birth date of August 8, 1924 or August 18, 1924.) At thirteen, he joined a number of son groups in his native town, such as Benito De Amas, Cervantes en Remedios and others, and developed into a prominent singer in both son and bolero styles.

== Career ==
During the 1940s, Planas moved to Havana, where he joined the Juanito Roger ensemble, the Ernesto Duarte orchestra, and Carlos Barbería's Kubavana jazz-band as a singer. He toured extensively with Sonora Matancera and Celia Cruz, in both America and Europe, and made several recordings for the Puchito, Panart and RCA Victor record labels, including with Orquesta Ritmo y Melodía, directed by Roberto Puente, in 1959.

In 1966, Planas joined the Rumbavana ensemble (founded in 1955), sharing vocals with Fernando González and Guido Soto. Under the direction of Joseíto González, the Rumbavana ensemble released a series of successful recordings by the EGREM label and a number of radio broadcasting studios. During this period and into the 1970s, Planas sang on many hits, such as "Te invito un momento" and "Te traigo mi son cubano".

In 1982, he joined the Conjunto Tropicuba, sharing vocals at one point with Felix Baloy, and then the Conjunto Chappottín. Later on, he became a member of the Rubalcaba Orchestra. As a solo artist he released his first solo album, Señor del son, in the 1980s through Siboney. In the early 1990s, he formed part of Félix Reina's charanga. After turning independent, he guested on recordings such as the CD entitled Pasaporte (winner of the EGREM Great Award in 1994), with Tata Güines and Miguel "Angá" Díaz.

In 1994, Planas and Radio Progreso announcer Eduardo Rosillo approached retired pianist Rubén González—with whom Planas had already recorded the album Dos Grandes five years earlier—with the idea of recording new versions of ten songs composed by fellow Cuban pianist Lilí Martínez. The resulting album, Son Inconcluso, featured a full band including bassist Orlando "Cachaíto" López and Arturo "Alambre dulce" Harvey (ex-tresero with Conjunto Chappottín), among others, and was released in 1999 by EGREM.

In 1996, Planas joined the Afro-Cuban All Stars project directed by Juan de Marcos González, and participated in the recording of A Toda Cuba le Gusta, which was nominated for the 1997 Grammy Awards. This album again featured Rubén González and Orlando "Cachaíto" López, along with a big band of veteran Cuban musicians and singers such as Ibrahim Ferrer, Pío Leyva, Manuel 'Puntillita' Licea, and Félix Baloy. It was the first album recorded during the consecutive sessions that would also deliver the albums Buena Vista Social Club and Introducing...Rubén González.

Planas was one of the best Cuban son musicians of all time.

— Juan de Marcos González.

Planas also wrote songs such as: "Baila Francisca", "Dicharachos Criollos", "Maria Del Carmen", "Me Voy a Poner Pa' Tí", "Que Buenas Son", "Quiéreme Mucho Caridad", "Se Me Fue Mi Negrita", and "Sola Estás".

Planas died at his home in Pueblo Nuevo, Havana on February 28, 2001.

== Selected discography ==
=== As primary artist ===
- Señor del son (Siboney, 1980s)
- Te Invito Un Momento (EGREM, 1995)
- Para Todos Los Tiempos (Orun, 2002) – Recorded in 2000
- Tumbayaya (EGREM, 2004)
- La Vida Es Un Sueño (Connector, 2009)

=== With Carlos Barbería y su Orquesta Kubavana ===
- Que Tienes Titina? (Panart, 1950s)
- A Toda Cuba Le Gusta (Caney CCD 505, 1995) – Recorded in 1958–1959. Planas sings on tracks 2, 4, 6, 8, 12, 14, 16
- Perlas Cubanas: Yo Soy Caguairán (Vintage Music, 2014)

=== With Orquesta Ritmo y Melodía ===
- Perlas Cubanas: Raúl Planas y Orquesta Ritmo y Melodía (Vintage Music, 2014)

=== With Conjunto Rumbavana ===
- Reencuentro Entre Soneros (EGREM, 1987)

=== With Charanga Rubalcaba ===
- Fundadores Del Sabor (1995) – Planas sings on tracks 1, 3, 5, 7, 10, 12

=== With Tata Güines & Miguel "Angá" Díaz ===
- Pasaporte (Enja, 1994) – Planas sings on "Rumberos Del Ayer"

=== With Rubén González ===
- Dos Grandes: Raúl Planas & Rubén González / Con la Orquesta Jorrín (EGREM, 2000) – Recorded in 1989
- Son Inconcluso (EGREM, 1999) – Recorded in 1994; reissued as Trilogía De Boleros in 2002 on the Exotica label

=== With Afro-Cuban All Stars ===
- A Toda Cuba le Gusta (World Circuit, 1997)

=== Compilations ===
- Son Del Mundo (EGREM, 2000) – Planas sings on "Como Siento Yo" and "Juancito Trucupey"
- De Cuba Son: Roots of Buena Vista (EGREM, 2000) – Planas sings on "Rumberos Del Ayer" and "A Mi Manera"
- Cuban Superstars (Direct Source, 2004) – Planas sings on "Rumberos Del Ayer"
- Cuban All Stars - Volume 2 (Connector, 2010) – Planas sings on "Los Herederos"
- Th'is Cuba: Hot Cuban Music (Promo Sound, 2011) – Planas sings on "Rumberos Del Ayer"
- Best of Buena Vista (Arc Music, 2012) – Planas sings on tracks 5, 9, 12, 17
- El Gran Tesoro de la Musica Cubana, Vol.1 (2013) – Planas sings on "Soy Hijo del Siboney"

== See also ==
- Music of Cuba
