= Rubén González (pianist) =

Cuban musician (1919–2003)

Background information
- Birth name: Rubén González Fontanills
- Born: 26 May 1919; Santa Clara, Cuba
- Died: 8 December 2003 (aged 84); Havana, Cuba
- Genres: Son, danzón, mambo, chachachá, Afro-Cuban jazz, descarga
- Occupation: Musician
- Instrument: Piano
- Years active: 1937–2002
- Labels: RCA Victor; Panart; EGREM; World Circuit
- Formerly of: Paulina Álvarez; Arsenio Rodríguez; Conjunto Kubavana; Ernesto Grenet; Senén Suárez; Orquesta América del 55; Orquesta Riverside; Pucho Escalante; Enrique Jorrín; Estrellas de Areito; Afro-Cuban All Stars; Buena Vista Social Club

Rubén González Fontanills (26 May 1919 – 8 December 2003) was a Cuban pianist. Together with Lilí Martínez and Peruchín he is said to have "forged the style of modern Cuban piano playing in the 1940s".

Between the 1940s and his retirement in the 1980s, he played with Cuba's most successful acts, including Paulina Álvarez, Arsenio Rodríguez, Orquesta América del 55, Orquesta Riverside and Enrique Jorrín. In the 1990s, he came out of retirement to play in the revival ensembles Afro-Cuban All Stars and Buena Vista Social Club, also recording solo material and performing live until 2002.

== Biography ==
=== Early life and career ===
González was born in Santa Clara, Cuba, on 26 May 1919. His family moved to the small village of Encrucijada when he was 6 years old. He took up the piano at age seven and graduated from the Cienfuegos Conservatory at age 15.

He grew up wanting to be a doctor and studied medicine, thinking music would remain a hobby he could pursue by night. However, he abandoned his studies after four years because music was "in his blood" and also because of all the encouragement he received from people around him. Thus, after graduating from high school, he began playing with groups in Cienfuegos and around the country.

=== From Havana to Venezuela ===
In 1941, González moved to Havana where he played in the charanga of danzonete singer Paulina Álvarez, as well as Orquesta Elósegui and the orchestra of the CMQ radio station. He became friends with important pianists such as René Hernández, Anselmo Sacasas, Jesús López and Facundo Rivero. He joined Arsenio Rodríguez's conjunto in 1943, replacing Adolfo "Panacea" O'Reilly. Rodríguez advised him to "just play your own style, whatever it is, but don't imitate anyone". Although González's first confirmed recordings with Arsenio's conjunto are dated to 5 July 1945, earlier recordings might feature him, since Panacea's last confirmed recording session took place on 16 November 1943; these recordings were all released by RCA Victor.

In 1945, he left the conjunto—and was replaced by Lilí Martínez—to go to Panama with the ensemble Estrellas Negras, comprising mostly ex-Rodríguez musicians. With the Estrellas Negras, González toured most of South America—from Mexico City to Buenos Aires—and, on his return to Cuba, he joined the Conjunto Kubavana directed by Alberto Ruiz. He also performed with the Orquesta Los Hermanos Castro which, at one time, featured Mongo Santamaría.

Between 1948 and the mid-1950s, González played with Ernesto Grenet and Senén Suárez at the Cabaret Tropicana. At the same time, he became a member of René Álvarez y Los Astros and he often played with Orquesta Gris, Orquesta Ideal de Joseíto Valdés, Orquesta Siboney de Armando Pidre, and Los Hermanos Lebatard. In 1954, he backed Rolando Laserie at the Cabaret San Souci.

In the mid-1950s, he toured Venezuela with the charanga Orquesta América del 55. He established himself in Venezuela between 1957 and 1962, in the orchestra directed by Luis Alfonso Larraín. He also briefly resided in Argentina, where he played with tango musicians. By the late 1950s, Rubén González was widely known in Cuba and other parts of Latin America.

=== Back in Havana ===
González returned to Cuba in 1961, joining the famous big band Orquesta Riverside. In 1962, he became the pianist for the Orquesta de Enrique Jorrín, and would continue to play for him for the next 25 years. In 1964, González joined Pucho Escalante's Noneto Cubano de Jazz.

In 1975, he recorded his eponymous solo album backed by members of Jorrín's orchestra; the album was released by Areíto as LD-3582. In 1979, he recorded the album Los héroes as part of the Estrellas de Areito all-star ensemble. After Jorrín's death in 1987, González briefly took over the role of bandleader, but retired soon after.

=== Career revival ===
In 1994, Raúl Planas and Radio Progreso announcer Eduardo Rosillo approached González with the idea of recording new versions of ten songs composed by fellow Cuban pianist Lilí Martínez. The resulting album, Son Inconcluso, featured a full band including bassist Orlando "Cachaíto" López and Arturo "Alambre dulce" Harvey (ex-tresero with Conjunto Chappottín), among others, and was released in 1999 by EGREM.

In 1995, Nick Gold (head of World Circuit Records) and Juan de Marcos González (director and tres player of Sierra Maestra) decided to record a series of descarga sessions featuring classic Cuban musicians, including Rubén González on piano, together with African virtuosos Toumani Diabate (kora player) and Djelimady Tounkara (guitarist). By early 1996, the Cuban musicians had already been selected and the African musicians were about to leave for Cuba, but could not travel because of difficulties in obtaining visas. (Note: The project became a reality in 2010 with the recording of Afrocubism.) Gold then invited Ry Cooder and his son Joachim to participate in the sessions; Ry would play guitar and Joachim African percussion.

The sessions, all of which featured Rubén González on piano, took place in March 1996 in Havana's EGREM studios. The first set of recordings was meant to revive the 1950s Cuban big band sound. This material yielded the album A Toda Cuba le Gusta credited to the Afro-Cuban All Stars and produced by Gold and Juan de Marcos, who also played tres. It again featured Orlando "Cachaíto" López on bass along with vocalists Ibrahim Ferrer, Pío Leyva, Manuel "Puntillita" Licea, Raúl Planas, Félix Baloy and José Antonio "Maceo" Rodríguez. Cooder also played slide guitar on Lilí Martínez's famous son "Alto Songo". In the sleeve notes, Juan de Marcos wrote: "This album is dedicated to Rubén González, genius of Cuban piano".

The second set of recordings were meant to revive the acoustic sound of the 1940s Cuban trova and filin movements. It yielded the critically acclaimed Buena Vista Social Club album. Gold was credited as executive producer, Juan de Marcos as A & R consultant and Cooder as producer. Here Rubén González on piano and Cachaíto on bass accompanied singers Compay Segundo, Ibrahim Ferrer, Omara Portuondo and Eliades Ochoa. Cooder played guitar on all but one track.

In April 1996, and using left over studio time after the sessions that had produced the previous two albums, the solo album Introducing...Rubén González was recorded in just two days, live with no overdubs. All three albums were released on Nick Gold's World Circuit Records in 1997. In early 1998, Wim Wenders filmed a documentary entitled Buena Vista Social Club, and González and his colleagues became famous worldwide.

=== Later years and death ===
"If I can't take a piano with me to heaven, then I don't want to go."

— Rubén González

Between 1997 and 2000, González recorded his next album, Chanchullo, at EGREM Studios in Havana and Angel Recording Studios in London. Some recordings he made in September 1999 at EGREM studios were released by EGREM as Rubén González and Friends in 2000. His last public appearances took place in Mexico and Cuba in 2002.

In the morning of 8 December 2003, Rubén González died at his home in Havana after a long illness which had prevented him from walking and eventually led to renal and respiratory problems. He was survived by his wife, Eneida Lima, and is buried in Havana's Cristóbal Colón Cemetery.

== Style and legacy ==
"[González is] the greatest piano soloist I have ever heard in my entire life. A Cuban cross between Thelonious Monk and Felix the Cat."

— Ry Cooder

Rubén González is considered an innovator of the son cubano piano style. The genre's early ensembles (sextetos and septetos) lacked pianos, and these were introduced in the late 1930s by the first three conjuntos: Arsenio Rodríguez's conjunto, Alberto Ruiz's Conjunto Kubavana, and Conjunto Casino. González played in the former two, which made him a pioneer in the genre. Apart from the son, González had a profound knowledge of the danzón and his improvisations are characterized by harmonic subtleties. His style has been described as "romantic and angular", possessing "strong lyricism" with characteristic "swirling arpeggios".

Like his contemporary Peruchín, González was influenced by jazz, particularly by Bud Powell and Thelonious Monk, which made him one of the grandfathers of Afro-Cuban jazz. His style has influenced Eddie Palmieri, amongst others.

== Discography ==
=== As principal artist ===
- Rubén González (Areito, 1975) (Note: Reissued in 1997 under a new title, Indestructible, on CD (EGREM) and LP (Areito).)
- Introducing...Rubén González (World Circuit, 1997)
- Chanchullo (World Circuit, 2000)

=== As sideman ===
With Noneto Cubano de Jazz

- Jazz Cuba (Areito/Palma, 1964) (Note: Reissued in 2000 as Sentimiento on CD (EGREM).)

With Estrellas de Areito

- Los héroes (Areito, 1979)

With Afro-Cuban All Stars

- A Toda Cuba le Gusta (World Circuit, 1997)

With Buena Vista Social Club

- Buena Vista Social Club (World Circuit, 1997)
- Buena Vista Social Club at Carnegie Hall (World Circuit, 2008)
- Lost and Found (World Circuit, 2015)

With Raúl Planas

- Son Inconcluso (EGREM, 1999) – Recorded in 1994; reissued as Trilogía De Boleros in 2002 on the Exotica label
- Dos Grandes – Con la Orquesta Jorrín (EGREM, 2000) – Recorded in 1989

=== Compilations ===
- Rubén González and Friends (EGREM, 2000)
- Todo sentimiento (Yemayá, 2004)
- The Essential Rubén González (Manteca, 2006)

== Filmography ==
With Buena Vista Social Club

- Buena Vista Social Club DVD (Road Movies/Sony VCD0040, 1999) – Directed by Wim Wenders

With Afro-Cuban All Stars

- Afro-Cuban Legends DVD (Warner Music Vision 8573-88531-2, 2001) – Directed by Tony Knox
