= Rubén González =

Rubén González may refer to:

== Arts and entertainment ==
- Rubén González (pianist) (1919–2003), Cuban pianist
  - Rubén González (album), his first studio album
  - Introducing... Rubén González, his second studio album

== Politics ==
- Rubén González Cárdenas (1875–1939), Venezuelan politician

== Religion ==
- Rubén González Medina (born 1949), bishop for the Roman Catholic Diocese of Caguas, Puerto Rico

== Sports ==
=== Association football ===
- Rubén González (Chilean footballer) (born 1927), Chilean football
- Rubén González (Uruguayan footballer) (born 1939), Uruguayan football defender
- Rubén González (footballer, born 1982), Spanish football centre-back
- Rubén González Alves (born 1994), Spanish football centre-back

=== Other sports ===
- Rubén González (luger) (born 1962), Argentine luger
- Ruben Gonzales (tennis) (born 1985), Filipino tennis player
