= Bruca maniguá =

Single by Orquesta Casino de la Playa
- B-side: "Dolor cobarde"
- Released: 1937
- Recorded: June 17, 1937
- Genre: Afro-son
- Length: 3:13
- Label: RCA Victor
- Songwriter: Arsenio Rodríguez

Orquesta Casino de la Playa singles chronology
"Cachita" (1937)	"Bruca maniguá" (1937)	"Ben acá Tomá" (1937)

"Bruca maniguá" is an afro-son composed by Arsenio Rodríguez in 1937. It was first recorded by Orquesta Casino de la Playa featuring the arrangement of Anselmo Sacasas and Miguelito Valdés on vocals in June 1937. Ever since it has become a Cuban son standard, with famous versions by Abelardo Barroso, Sierra Maestra, Buena Vista Social Club and Ibrahim Ferrer. The song, which has been called "a landmark in the development of Cuban popular music" by Ned Sublette, was Arsenio Rodríguez's first hit and an example of his Afro-Cuban style of son within the afrocubanismo movement.

== History ==
Both the lyrics and the music of the song were written in 1937 by Arsenio Rodríguez, who at the time was 25 years old and the de facto musical director of the Septeto Bellamar, which he had joined in 1934. The popularity of the group made him become acquainted with important musicians such as Antonio Arcaño, Anselmo Sacasas and Miguelito Valdés. The latter two musicians were respectively the director/arranger for and the singer of the famous big band Orquesta Casino de la Playa. In June 1937, Sacasas and Valdés decided to record two of Rodríguez's songs. One was "Bruca maniguá" and the other one was "Ben acá Tomá". Both songs were released as A-sides of their respective singles, but only "Bruca maniguá" (with the bolero son "Dolor cobarde" as B-side) achieved international success, marking the start of Rodríguez's rise to fame.

== Music ==
Although the song was labeled as a "conga" on the original 78 rpm single by RCA Victor, it is in fact an afro-son, i.e. a son montuno combined with African motifs. The song, notable for its complex harmonies, is divided into two parts; the first part is slow and includes three verses, whereas the second part is faster, with repeated chorus lines such as "Yényere bruca maniguá" and "Chéchere bruca maniguá, ae". The tango-congo rhythmic cell is featured prominently in the song.

== Lyrics ==
The lyrics of the song are written in the first person. The first verse of the song makes a statement about the freedom of African slaves and their descendants in Cuba: "Yo soy carabalí, negro de nación; sin la libertad, no puedo vivir" (Note: The actual spelling of the lyrics is "Africanized", thus: "Yo son carabalí, nego de nación; sin la libetá, no pueo viví".) ("I am carabalí, black of nation; without freedom, I can't live"). The term "carabalí" refers to a Cuban ethnic group comprising descendants of inhabitants of the Calabar region in Nigeria. "Negro de nación" was a common term in Cuba to refer to black slaves.

The song is written in a form of creolized Spanish known as "bozal" (a term equivalent to "negro de nación"), combining Spanish with "lengua palera", the Kikongo dialect used in Palo Monte. In a 1964 interview, Rodríguez explained that the lyrics were written in the "Congo" language of his ancestors. Both the usage of bozal (or "neobozal", according to Ned Sublette) and the thematic elements of the song fall within the context of the afrocubanismo movement which had started in the 1920s as an attempt to acknowledge and preserve Afro-Cuban culture.

== Other versions ==
The earliest versions recorded after Casino de la Playa's were done also in 1937. Cuarteto Caney recorded a version for Columbia featuring Panchito Riset on vocals. Another recording, by Xavier Cugat and his orchestra featuring Alfredo Valdés on vocals, is also very similar to the original and was directed at the American market. In 1938, Alfredo Valdés recorded another version, this time with Nilo Menéndez. Both versions with Alfredo Valdés on vocals were released by RCA Victor.

In the 1950s, "Bruca maniguá" became the title track of an LP recorded by Abelardo Barroso and his band, Orquesta Sensación, for Puchito.

Arsenio Rodríguez himself recorded a version of the song for his 1963 album Quindembo · Afro Magic · La Magia de Arsenio Rodríguez.

In 1998, revivalist band Sierra Maestra recorded the song for the album Coco mai mai. Similarly, "Bruca maniguá" was one of the classic Cuban songs in the repertoire of Buena Vista Social Club, including it in Ibrahim Ferrer's 1999 album Buena Vista Social Club Presents Ibrahim Ferrer, as well as their archival album Lost and Found, released in 2015.

== See also ==
- Arsenio Rodríguez discography
