= Babalú =

Cuban song

Song
- Language: Spanish creole
- Published: 1939 (USA)
- Genre: Afro
- Songwriter: Margarita Lecuona

"Babalú" is an international popular Afro Cuban song written by Margarita Lecuona, the cousin of composers Ernestina and Ernesto Lecuona. The song title is a reference to the Santería deity (Yoruba: òrìṣà) Babalú Ayé (Yoruba: Obalúayé).

== Lyrics ==
In the song's lyrics, originally written in Spanish creole, the singer wonders aloud what to do with a statue of Babalú Ayé, now that a Santería rite had been invoked by others. He suggests that seventeen candles be lit up, in the shape of a cross, and that a cigar and aguardiente be brought to him, as to pay homage to the deity. He then requests good luck, love from his beloved woman, and safety and protection to both.

== History ==
The song was first published in the United States in 1939 by Peer International. The first publication with an English translation (by Sydney King Russell) was in 1941.

"Babalú" was the signature song of the fictional television character Ricky Ricardo, played by Desi Arnaz in the television comedy series I Love Lucy, though it was already an established musical number for Arnaz in the 1940s as evidenced in the 1946 film short Desi Arnaz and His Orchestra. By the time Arnaz had adopted the song, it had become a Latin American music standard, arranged by Anselmo Sacasas for and originally recorded by the renowned Cuban jazz band, Orquesta Casino de la Playa in 1938. It was associated mainly with the band’s Cuban singer Miguelito Valdés, who subsequently recorded one of its many versions with Xavier Cugat and his Waldorf-Astoria Orchestra. Arnaz made the song a rather popular cultural reference in the United States.

Whenever Arnaz and his band played the song live, he would finish it with an extended conga solo and chorus-refrain section, mimicking Cuban comparsas (a popular genre usually associated with the city of Santiago de Cuba). This section has been quoted by other Cuban artists, most notably by Miami Sound Machine in their live presentations.

Yma Sumac sang it in 1952 in her second single "Wimoweh"/"Babalú" with Capitol Records. It was an introduction for Sumac into traditional pop music. Johnny Mathis recorded the song twice. It was included on his album Johnny Mathis (1956) and his album Olé (1964). Billy Eckstine recorded the song on his album Billy's Best! (Mercury, 1958, with Billy May's Orchestra).

In Hanna-Barbera's "Quick Draw McGraw", the title character's Mexican burro sidekick, who was based on Desi Arnaz, was named Baba Looey in a nod to the song.

The song is performed by Maria Andipa in the 1962 "Death's Dispatch" episode of The Avengers. A Ska rendition was recorded and performed by Ska Cubano a Mambo-Ska band from Britain made up of musicians and singers from many diverse countries.

In the early fifties, the song was recorded by Brazilian singer Angela Maria, and it became her biggest hit.
