= Afro-Cuban All Stars =

Cuban musical band

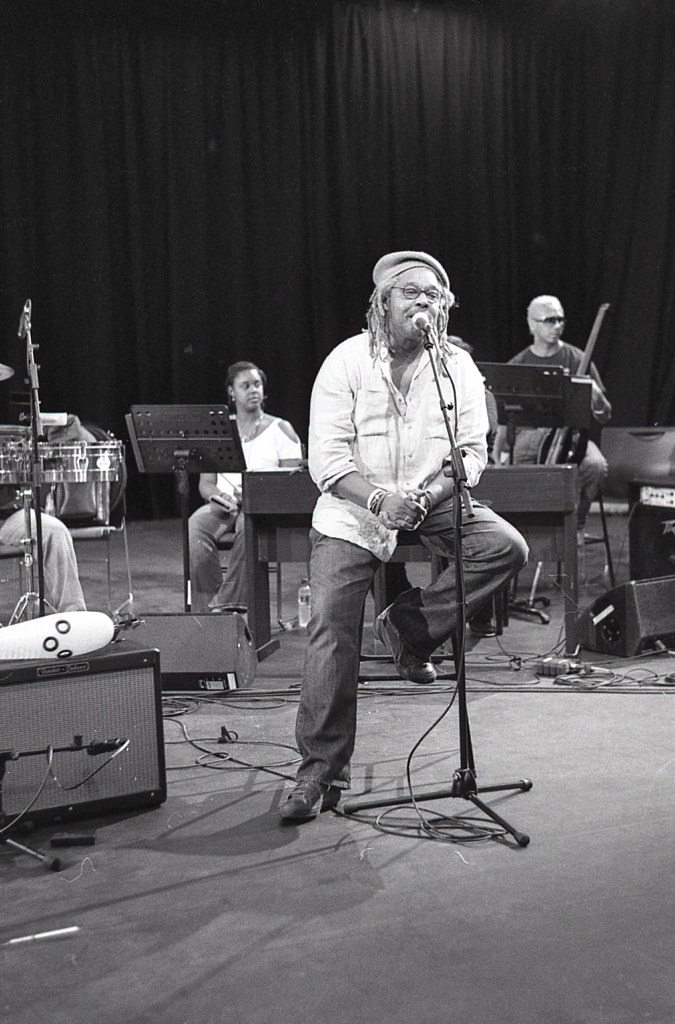
- Juan de Marcos Gonzalez, leader

Background information
- Genres: Cuban music
- Members: Félix Baloy; Pedro Calvo
- Past members: Rubén González; Orlando "Cachaito" Lopez; Ibrahim Ferrer; Caridad Hierrezuelo; Raul Planas; Pío Leyva; Manuel "Puntillita" Licea; José Antonio "Maceo" Rodríguez; Yanko Pisaco
- Website: afrocubanallstarsonline.com

Afro-Cuban All Stars is a Cuban band led by Juan de Marcos González. Their music is a mix of all the styles of Cuban music, including bolero, chachachá, salsa, son montuno, timba, guajira, danzón, rumba and abakua.

They are known internationally for their 1997 album A Toda Cuba le Gusta, which was recorded at the Buena Vista Social Club sessions. Members have included Rubén González, Orlando "Cachaíto" López, Ibrahim Ferrer, Raúl Planas, Pío Leyva, Manuel "Puntillita" Licea, Félix Baloy, Yanko Pisaco and more recently Caridad Hierrezuelo and Pedro Calvo.

== History ==
In early 1996 Nick Gold, head of World Circuit Records, invited Ry Cooder to participate in an experiment combining Cuban and African musicians. A group of Cuban musicians had already been assembled, including Rubén González as the pianist. However, since the African musicians had experienced difficulties in obtaining visas, the focus changed to recording Cuban music instead.

In March 1996, Gold and Juan de Marcos González (previously the tres player of Sierra Maestra) produced A Toda Cuba le Gusta, the first album by the Afro-Cuban All Stars. It was recorded at the EGREM Studios in Havana and featured Rubén González (piano), Orlando "Cachaíto" López (bass), and a big band of veteran Cuban musicians and singers, most of whom had careers that went back to the 1950s Havana scene: Ibrahim Ferrer, Pío Leyva, Manuel 'Puntillita' Licea, Raúl Planas, Félix Baloy, and José Antonio "Maceo" Rodríguez. Cooder also played slide guitar on one track, "Alto Songo". In the sleeve notes, de Marcos González, who directed the project and played tres, wrote: "This album is dedicated to Rubén González, genius of Cuban piano".

During follow-on sessions also held at EGREM Studios in March 1996, Cooder then produced the Grammy winning Buena Vista Social Club, featuring Rubén González (piano), Compay Segundo, Ibrahim Ferrer, Omara Portuondo and Eliades Ochoa, supported by much of the same band that had recorded the Afro-Cuban All Stars album, and with Juan de Marcos González now acting as A & R Consultant. Cooder played guitars on all but one track.

Finally, in April 1996 and using left over studio time after the sessions that had produced the previous two albums, the solo album Introducing...Rubén González was recorded in just two days, live with no overdubs. On the album's outer cover, Cooder is quoted as saying: "The greatest piano soloist I have ever heard in my entire life. A Cuban cross between Thelonious Monk and Felix the Cat".

All three albums were released on Nick Gold's World Circuit Records in 1997. In early 1998, Wim Wenders filmed a documentary entitled Buena Vista Social Club, and the entire group of Cuban artists became famous worldwide.

== Discography ==
- A Toda Cuba le Gusta (1997)
- Distinto, Diferente (1999)
- Baila mi Son (Featuring Felix Baloy) (2000)
- Bajando Gervasio (Featuring Amadito Valdes) (2002)
- Live in Japan (2005)
- Step Forward (2005)
- Absolutely Live (2009)
- Absolutely Live II (2017)
