= Tibiri Tabara =

Studio album by Sierra Maestra
- Released: 1997
- Genre: Son
- Label: World Circuit; Nonesuch
- Producer: Nick Gold, Alejandro Suárez, Eduardo Himely

Sierra Maestra chronology
El Guanajo Relleno (1995)	Tibiri Tabara (1997)	Rumbero Soy (2002)

Tibiri Tabara is an album by the Cuban band Sierra Maestra, released in 1997. It was the band's second album for a major label. The band supported the album with a North American tour.

== Production ==
Recorded in London, the album was produced by Nick Gold, Alejandro Suárez, and Eduardo Himely. Unlike some traditional Cuban bands, Sierra Maestra incorporated modern musical styles into its sound, including descarga. Juan de Marcos González helped to arrange the songs. Bernardo Sassetti played piano. Five vocalists sang on Tibiri Tabara. "Yo soy Tiburón" was written by Arsenio Rodríguez.

== Critical reception ==
Professional ratings
Review scores
Source	Rating
AllMusic	4/5 stars
The Baltimore Sun	4/4 stars
The Encyclopedia of Popular Music	3/5 stars
Los Angeles Times	3.5/4 stars
MusicHound World: The Essential Album Guide	4/5 stars
The Sydney Morning Herald	4/5 stars

The Sydney Morning Herald called the album "traditional, no-frills music done very well... And the mixture of danceable tunes, son montunos and more melodic sones is just right." The Globe and Mail wrote: "Star soloist piano player Bernardo Sassetti corners the band's jazz market with hard-driving (if occasionally lick-heavy) flights, but the real star is the whole Sierra Maestra galaxy—the nine-piece band's collective propulsion and flawless vocal ensemble work."

Newsday noted that "this Cuban nonet swings son music like nobody's business." The Baltimore Sun concluded that "it's one thing to know that Cuba has the richest musical heritage of any nation in the Caribbean, quite another to have the depth and breadth of that tradition demonstrated by a single band."

AllMusic wrote that "this large band creates a bright testament to the glories of Cuban music, from son to changui."

== Track listing ==
No.	Title	Length
1.	"Tibiri Tábara"
2.	"¿Dónde va Chichi?"
3.	"Yo soy Tiburón"
4.	"Marieta"
5.	"Son para tí"
6.	"Felipe Blanco"
7.	"En el Silencio de la Noche"
8.	"El Guararey de Pastora"
9.	"Con la Espuela"
10.	"Anabacoa"
