= Carlos Barbería y su Orquesta Kubavana =

Cuban musician

Carlos Barbería began his career in Havana, Cuba in the 1950s playing night clubs such as Monmatre and Tropicana. An early album titled "Carlos Barbería and his Orquesta "Kubavana" featured singer Yvette De La Fuente who performed with the band during the mid-1950s in Havana. "Bésame Mucho", Consuelo Velazquez' classic bolero, sung and recorded internationally by many artists and which was later recorded by The Beatles and the 2008 recording by Luis Miguel of another old classic "La Gloria Eres Tu" by Jose Antonio Mendez, were two of the songs on the album. During the 1950s Barberia also directed a smaller ensemble or combo, which featured Regino Tellechea and also Ivette de la Fuente as singers. His jazz band in Havana also featured famous sonero/bolerista singers like Raúl Planas, Juan Antonio Jo "El Fantasmita" and sometimes Rudy Calzado and Carlos Embale. In his day Barberia was very talented and a great host. In Havana he met the famous Ava Gardner. That same night the actress invited him out; she loved the way he conducted his orchestra, the way he would wear the "habanera", a typical Cuban shirt. Barberia with his band and combo steadily recorded for various Cuban labels. He was featured in Cuba's foremost TV and radio stations as well as featured in Havana's top night clubs and theatres. During the 1970s and 1980s Barbería led a Cuban big band, Orquesta Kubavana, in New York. Artists who performed with him included Paquito D'Rivera, Willy 'El Baby' Rodríguez (who also sang with Sonora Matancera), and Meñique (who also sang with Charlie Palmieri). as well as a featured performance by Yvette De La Fuente.

Chevere, the 1975 "Discolando" label release from Carlos Barbería y su Orquesta Kubavana, Rodolfo Manzano, Leonardo Rubino, and Miguel Menedez on trumpets, Al Cobb on trombone, Vicente Prado, Roberto Perez, Howard Johnson, and Max Lucas on saxes, Elio "Pepsi-Cola" Martinez on piano, Bobby Rodríguez on bass, Sammy Leon on congas, Julio Perez on bongos and timbales, and the voices of Juan Coronel and Tito Contreras.

In 1980, Carlos Barbería y su Orquesta Kubavana recorded the Lp Rarezas del Siglo, later re-edited on CD format, featuring Rolando 'Ruso' Aguilo, Ike Acometa, E. Suarez 'Jaruco,' Jesús Silva, and Mario Bonafede on trumpets, Marco Katz on trombone, Vicente Prado, Mitchel Endick, and Maxwell Lucas on saxes, Elio "Pepsi Cola" Martínez on piano, Cucho Martínez on bass, Rolando Diaz on conga, Marcelino Valdés on bongos and timbales, and the vocalists Tito Contreras, Meñique, and Willy "El Baby" Rodríguez.
