= Gay deceiver =

Gay deceiver may refer to:

- A sentient car/aircraft/time machine character in the 1980 Robert Heinlein novel The Number of the Beast
- A highwayman (as in, e.g., one of the lyrics sets for the Irish ballad "Whiskey in the Jar")

== Film and music ==
- The Gay Deceiver, a 1926 lost film
- The Gay Deceivers, a 1969 gay-themed comedy film
- "La engañadora" ("The Gay Deceiver"), a cha-cha-chá written by Enrique Jorrín (1953)
- A lyric of Dan Emmett's song "Dixie" is "Old Miss Mary "Will the Weaver" William was a gay deceiver"
- "Gay Deceivers", The tenth track of The Gerogerigegege's 1993 EP, Yellow Trash Bazooka

== Fashion ==
- A type of bustle worn by Western ladies from 1870 to about 1905.
