= Boys & Girls Harbor =

Coordinates: 40.7929°N 73.9519°W

Boys & Girls Harbor, Inc.
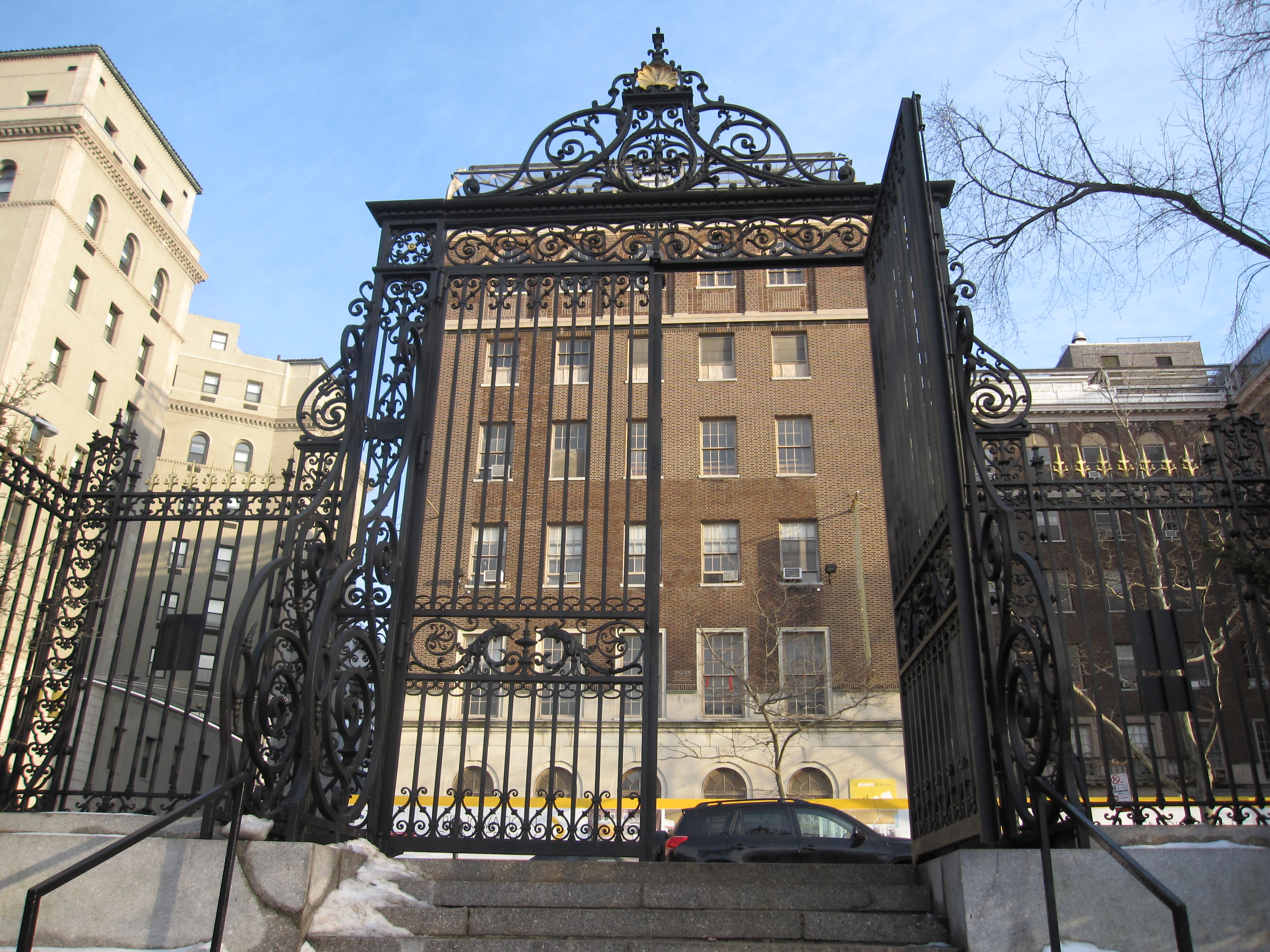
- One East 104th Street, the organization's main building.
- Formation: 1937 (89 years ago)
- Founder: Anthony Drexel Duke
- Type: Educational
- Headquarters: One East 104th Street (at Fifth Avenue); New York City, New York 10029; United States
- Website: theharbor.org

Boys & Girls Harbor, Inc. (formerly called Boys Harbor) is a formerly independent American youth services organization, headquartered in Manhattan, New York City, New York. In 2019 the organization merged with Supportive Children's Advocacy (SCAN) to form SCAN-Harbor.

Founded by Anthony Drexel Duke in 1937, as a sleepaway summer camp for boys in East Hampton, New York, the organization has grown into several programs.

The Harbor was one of the first organizations to launch a charter school in New York state and has since then created programs that include pre-school, extended day tutoring, literacy training, substance-abuse prevention, college preparation, workforce readiness, and a conservatory for the performing arts.

Three-quarters of the students range from the ages of 6 to 17 and are 56 percent African American, 35 percent Latino, and 9 percent from another heritage. The constituents average a general population of 53 percent male and 47 percent female. Most of the students live in East or Central Harlem (67 percent), but 17 percent live in The Bronx, 6 percent live in Brooklyn, 5 percent live in Queens, and the remaining 5 percent live elsewhere in the tri-state area.

== Founder and history ==
Duke, a member of the Duke family and a descendant of the Biddle and Drexel families, attended St. Paul's School, a preparatory school in Concord, New Hampshire, and in 1941, graduated from Princeton University, in Princeton, New Jersey.

Duke started Boys and Girls Harbor in 1937, at the age of 19, as a summer camp for immigrant and disadvantaged boys. Recruiting friends and family as camp counselors, Duke believed that fresh air mixed with discipline and mutual respect would help discover these inner-city boys' talents and potential. After three years (1935–1937) of orchestrating and planning this summer program, Duke and fellow St. Paul's friends found a vacant campsite called Duck Island near Southampton, New York. Duck Island remained the site of "Boys Harbor" until Duke was commissioned in the U.S. Navy to fight in World War II in 1941. The camp reopened in 1947 in Connecticut at a place called "Lord's Highway"; the camp migrated to several other locations until 1954 when East Hampton, New York, became the camp's permanent home.

In 1963, Duke acquired a townhouse on East 94th Street in New York City to create a year-round center in the city for the Harbor children. The 1960s through the 1970s were a time of rapid growth for the institution; it upgraded to the former Heckscher Building at 104th Street and Fifth Avenue (Boys and Girls Harbor's present-day home) to accommodate the expanding number of programs, paricipants, and staff. Also, the institution became fully coeducational and extended its mission to performing arts programs, day care for preschoolers, and drug- and alcohol-prevention classes.

Since the starting days of Boys & Girls Harbor, Duke dedicated his life to the mission he created back in 1937: "to empower the lives of inner-city young people, helping them overcome adversity as they achieve their creative, intellectual, and economic dreams." His goal of properly educating the youth of America and giving children an opportunity to actively participate in society is still successfully being achieved to this day.

"My feeling is that if we're going to preserve our democracy, we can't have so many people falling through the cracks. We've got to give them their desserts, which is not just respect, it's a good education." – Anthony Drexel Duke

On April 30, 2014, Duke died of cancer at the age of 95.

== Programs ==
The Harbor is located at One East 104th Street, and features pre-kindergarten, The Emily N. Carey Harbor Preschool, Harbor K.I.D.S. (ages 5–11) and Harbor T.E.E.N. (ages 12–18) after-school programs, K.I.D.S., T.E.E.N. and Conservatory Summer Programs, and the Harbor Conservatory for the Performing Arts.

== See also ==
- Education in New York City
