= Marco Katz =

American musician

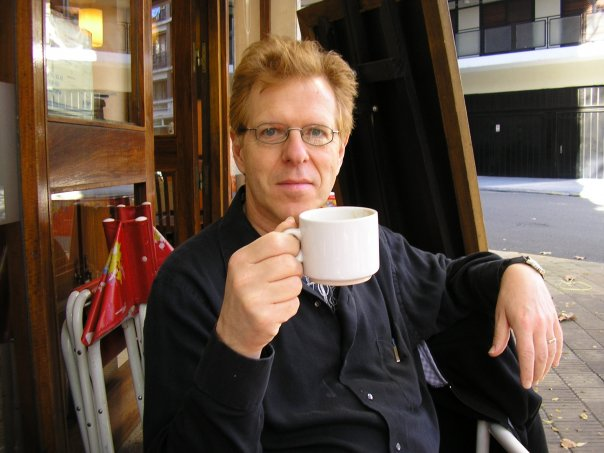
- Marco Katz in Buenos Aires 2009

Background information
- Born: March 16, 1957 (age 68)
- Origin: New York City, New York
- Genres: American music, jazz, salsa
- Instrument(s): Vocal, guitar, trombone
- Years active: 1970-

Marco Katz (born March 16, 1952, in New York City, USA) serves as an editor for a series that brings together music and literature at Palgrave Macmillan. He plays trombone and arranges and composes music for band, brass quintet and other musical ensembles. The reviewer Adam Gaines, in a review of the Bundee Brothers Bone Band album, wrote that "Katz's compositions are a real highlight of the disc. His trombone writing is expertly idiomatic, and his music is harmonically interesting without being obtuse." Mundo Universitario, a program televised by the University of Valle, featured "Marco Katz, master of literature and a professional musician, who was the last trombonist with the legends Charlie Palmieri and Mon Rivera."

== Biography ==
As a jazz and salsa trombonist in New York City, Katz became known for his unique use of the plunger mute. Katz performed as a featured soloist with Mon Rivera and recorded with the Lebron Brothers and Carlos Barbería y su Orquesta Kubavana. In 1978, he was nominated “Trombonist of the Year” by Latin NY magazine for his recording work with the Alegre All-Stars director Charlie Palmieri. Writing in Herencia Latina, the music critic Jairo Grijalba Ruiz noted that "The Heavyweight" by Palmieri included "a solo with mute by Marco Katz, which is truly extraordinary and at the same time brief demonstration of his style."

In 1994, he recorded "Tubby the Tuba Meets a Jazz Band" for Tubby the Tuba and Friends, an Angel Records release with narrations by Paul Tripp and performances by Bob Stewart on tuba, Jimmy Owens on trumpet, Paquito D'Rivera on clarinet, Katz on trombone, Chuck Folds on piano, John Thomas on percussion and Oliver Jackson on drums. This track was re-released as part of Tubby the Tuba Presents Play it Happy, on the Koch Records, now E1 Music, catalog with Meredith Vieira as narrator.

Katz's score for Zoey's Zoo (Oh Yeah! Cartoons on the Nickelodeon channel) helped the Nickelodeon production win first place at the 31st Annual International Animated Film Association (ASIFA) East Animation Festival on May 7, 2000. Katz’s compositions have been performed by the New York All-City High School band at Carnegie Hall and Avery Fisher Hall, his "Love Songs Theme" was broadcast nationally on VH1, and his arrangement of "Good Old Mountain Dew" was performed by Erich Kunzel and the Cincinnati Pops Orchestra. In 2013, Centaur Records released his song cycle for voice and piano based on Piedras del cielo by Pablo Neruda.

Katz's arrangements and compositions are published by Bourne Co. Music Publishers, International Music Co. and Carl Fischer Music. The arrangements for the International Music Company often employ classical compositions in settings for trombones and brass quintets. Although some of these works, especially the trombone trios and quartets, have been well received by educators, a reviewer in the International Trumpet Guild Journal finds fault with Katz's brass quintet arrangements of music by Juan Morel Campos. The reviewer objects to Katz's positing of Morel Campos as an important composer, noting "he does not merit a mention in The New Grove Dictionary of Music and Musicians." As for the works themselves, the reviewer finds them "rhythmically interesting but rather simple melodically."

Katz earned a Performing-Artists-in-the-Schools certification from Teachers College, Columbia University, in 1987. Five years later, he studied gamelan music in Bali. From 2001 to 2002, he lived in Spain and studied art, politics and literature at the Complutense University of Madrid, textual training that helped him formulate critical views on the place of musicians in contemporary society. He later earned his BA and MA at Humboldt State University and a PhD at the University of Alberta. Following those studies, he began to perform music and teach literature at MacEwan University. In the twenty-first century, Katz has turned to writing on music and other cultural topics. Palgrave Macmillan published his academic study of novels, Music and Identity in Twentieth Century Literature from Our America: Noteworthy Protagonists, a book that considers links between music and literature in works by Gabriel García Márquez, Alejo Carpentier, Zora Neale Hurston, John Okada, Joy Kogawa, and Tomson Highway. His article on "Popular Music Genres" appears in A Companion to Popular Culture, published in 2016 by Wiley-Blackwell.

Katz's English and Spanish language articles appear in the Routledge journal Popular Music and Society, Comparative American Studies, Atlantic Studies, Espéculo (Complutense University of Madrid), La Guagua, and Culturas Populares Revista Electrónica 5 (University of Alcalá) (July–December 2007). His article, "José Watanabe y el huso de la palabra" appears in Kaikan, a publication of the Asociación Peruano Japonesa in Lima, Peru that recognizes Katz's work on Peruvian Nikkei. An interview in Discover Nikkei, published by the Japanese American National Museum, further explores Katz's work in this area. His essay on Peruvian Dekasegi, “Whose Diaspora is This Anyway?: Peruvians, Japanese Perhaps, and Dekasegi, appears in Narratives of Citizenship: Indigenous and Diasporic Communities Unsettle the Nation-State (University of Alberta Press). Katz has also presented papers on music and literature at conferences of JALLA [Jornadas Andinas de Literatura Latino Americana], the National Association for Ethnic Studies, the Society for Ethnomusicology, the Modern Language Association, the Latin American Studies Association, and the American Comparative Literature Association.

Katz is the son of thespians Kip Gaylor (Sheldon F. Katz) and Ginny Gaylor (Virginia Montiel), the latter known as the "Lost Star of Vintage Paperbacks." In addition to appearing on the covers of numerous Vintage Books, his mother also modeled for early television commercials, magazine advertisements, and vinyl record albums. Fans of Duke Ellington have seen Ginny Gaylor on the cover of A Drum Is a Woman. His father, Kip Gaylor, acted as an extra in films and had speaking roles in early television shows, including Mister Peepers, with Wally Cox and Tony Randall. Katz is married to art historian M. Elizabeth "Betsy" Boone.

== Published works of fiction ==
- "Bobby Discovers Salsa" English Studies in Latin America (ESLA)
- "El disco 45" in the anthology Cartas de desamor y otras adicciones published by the Universidad de Alcalá - audio version at
- "Correo electrónico entre Eduardo Oso y Sancho Panza," a bilingual story in the journal White Rabbit published at the Pontificia Universidad Católica de Chile available at

== Discography ==
As trombonist:

- 1976 Distanto y Differente, Lebron Brothers, Cotique CS 1088 (Fania), 1976
- 1978 The Heavyweight, Charlie Palmieri, Alegre Records (Fania / Emusica - Remastered edition 130 065) Re-issued 2006
- 1980 Rarezas del siglo Carlos, Carlos Barbería y su Orquesta Kubavana, Lasonic, CD (CB 1994), Re-issued 1994
- 1993 A Mass for Mass Trombones, Wendy Mae Chambers, Centaur Records CD CRC 2263
- 1996 Tubby the Tuba and Friends, Paul Tripp, Angel Records
- 2009 Tubby the Tuba Presents Play it Happy, Meredith Vieira, Koch Records E1 Music
- 2012 In New Orleans, Dan Andersen Music, EP

As composer:

- 2003 Miscellanea Quintessential Brass Quintet
- 2009 Bundee Brothers Bone Band Featuring the Music of Marco Katz, Dragon Lady Records DL2501
- 2013 Las piedras del cielo, Centaur Records

== Music publications ==
Compositions:

- Montuno for Brass Quintet for brass quintet, Almitra (Kendor)
- Refresco for band, Bourne Co. Music Publishers
- Sunset Time on Broadway for trombone duet, Sneaky Yellow Dog Music
- L'Etoile for brass quintet, Sneaky Yellow Dog Music
- Casey Dog Blues for brass quintet, Sneaky Yellow Dog Music

Arrangements:

- Four Danzas by Juan Morel Campos for brass quintet, International Music Co.
- Bull Trombone for brass quintet, Carl Fischer Music
- Shoutin' Liza Trombone for brass quintet, Carl Fischer Music
- Miss Trombone for brass quintet, Carl Fischer Music
- Album of Renaissance Music for Three Trombones, International Music Co.
- Album of Renaissance Music for Four Trombones, International Music Co.
- And the Glory of the Lord for four trombones, International Music Co.
- Lassus Trombone for brass quintet, Carl Fischer Music
- Sally Trombone for brass quintet, Carl Fischer Music

== Books ==
- Music and Identity in Twentieth-Century Literature from Our America: Noteworthy Protagonists. Literatures of the Americas Series. New York: Palgrave Macmillan, 2014.
- Anthology chapter: "Popular Music Genres." A Companion to Popular Culture. Gary Burns, ed. Oxford: Wiley-Blackwell, 2016.
- Anthology chapter: “Whose Diaspora is This Anyway?: Peruvians, Japanese Perhaps, and Dekasegi.” Narratives of Citizenship: Indigenous and Diasporic Communities Unsettle the Nation-State. Aloys Fleischmann, Nancy Van Styvendale, and Cody McCarroll, eds. Edmonton: University of Alberta Press, 2011.

== Published articles ==
In English

- “As the Sun Set on Europe: Marvelous Realism and a New Place for America.” Atlantic Studies Journal: Literary, Cultural and Historical Perspectives. 9.2 (2012): 127-41.
- “Sounds from Nowhere: Musical Protagonists by Alejo Carpentier and Zora Neale Hurston.” Comparative American Studies. 10.1 (2012): 30-44.
- “Hearing through Our Eyes: Musical Archives and Authentic Performance.” Popular Music and Society. Routledge 31.4. (2008): 511-527.
- “Salsa Criticism at the Turn of the Century: Identity Politics and Authenticity.” Popular Music and Society. Routledge. 28:1 (2005): 35-54.
- “Whirled Music While U Wait.” Forum contribution. Popular Music and Society. Routledge. 30:5 (2007): 631-38.
- “Milton and Religious Violence.” Contribution to the PMLA Forum. March 2006.

In Spanish

- “José Watanabe y la palabra del huso.” Kaikan. 78. Lima, Peru. June 2013.
- “Tiras, timbres y estereotipos: el negro Memín Pinguín y la manipulación de la cultura popular con representaciones étnicas.” Culturas Populares. No. 5. Universidad de Alcalá de Henares (July–December 2007) ISSN 1886-5623.
- “Che y Teddy: el desarrollo de imágenes populares en la pantalla grande.” Espéculo: Revista de estudios literarios. Universidad Complutense de Madrid. No. 32 (March 2006) ISSN 1139-3637.
