= Afro (genre) =

Genre of Cuban popular music

- Stylistic origins: Cuban musical theatre; Santería music; Palo music
- Cultural origins: Late 19th century Cuban blackface theatre
- Typical instruments: Mainly vocal with additional percussion; may include guitar, horn section and/or full rhythm section

Subgenres
- Afro-son, canción afro, Afro-Cuban lullaby

Afro is a genre of Cuban popular music with African themes which gained prominence during the afrocubanismo movement in the early 20th century. It originated in the late 19th century Cuban blackface theatre, where some elements from Afro-Cuban music traditions such as Santería and Palo were incorporated into a secular context. As a result, black themes were occasionally portrayed in a stereotypical and derogatory manner. Nonetheless, many afros accurately depicted the working-class life of black communities in Cuba.

Afros are sung in a creolized form of Spanish, often similar to bozal. In the 1940s and 1950s, the genre reached its peak of popularity often mixing with son cubano giving rise to the hybrid style known as afro-son (or son-afro). Compositions not based on the son structure were often labelled as canción afro (afro-song) or canción de cuna afro (afro-lullaby); the latter became a popular form, especially due to the popularity of Ernesto Grenet's "Drume negrita". Among the most notable singers of afro were Rita Montaner, Bola de Nieve, Desi Arnaz and Merceditas Valdés.

== Influence ==
According to George Torres, "the infectious rhythm of the Afro was used by American artists" such as Duke Ellington and Chuck Berry (in his song "Havana Moon"). According to Ned Sublette, the genre was particularly innovative, asserting that "Babalú" was a forerunner of the kind of record Elvis Presley would make fifteen years later".

== Notable examples ==
The following afro compositions are often cited as the most representative of the genre.

- "Babalú" (Margarita Lecuona)
- "Tabú" (Margarita Lecuona)
- "Bruca maniguá" (Arsenio Rodríguez)
- "Drume negrita" (Ernesto Grenet)
- "Drumi mobila" (Bola de Nieve)
- "Ogguere" (Gilberto Valdés)
- "Lacho" (Facundo Rivero)
- "La culebra" (Obdulio Morales)
- "Mata siguaraya" (Tío Tom)
- "Rinkinkalla" (Juan Bruno Tarraza)

== See also ==
- Afro-Cuban music
