= Alfonso Joseph =

Alfonso "El Panameno" Joseph was born in the Republic of Panama, and immigrated to New York City at 11 years of age, where he studied music and became one of the forefront bassists of the Cuban bandleader Arsenio Rodríguez. Joseph is a featured guest in a major television production about the era of Afro-Cuban music at The Palladium in New York La Epoca.

Joseph's musical career began in the mid-1950s, learning and playing guitar with many Puerto Rican groups, "conjuntos", and playing diverse rhythmic variations of Puerto Rican music. He replaced the guitar strings with electronic strings and used the guitar as a bass, playing only the last four strings. With this convention, he became a bass player. Soon after, he graduated to Fender bass guitar and an Ampeg bass amplifier. Joseph was one of handful of bass players at that time, who introduced and popularized the bass guitar in the Latin, Jazz, Latin/Jazz and R&B venue.

Throughout the 1960s, Joseph performed at the Palladium and in the late Sixties and early Seventies, he performed at the Roseland Ballroom in New York. During the same era, he also played bass at Birdland, a club with regular jazz and Latin Jazz performances.

As a bass player and vocalist, Joseph accompanied several bandleaders and musicians during the main era of Latin music and Latin Jazz, including Arsenio Rodríguez and Candido. Arsenio Rodríguez was a Cuban tres guitarist, regarded as the originator of a Latin style called the son montuno. He taught Joseph the techniques of Cuban bass rhythms and syncopation. Joseph performed with Rodríguez at Carnegie Hall and recorded with him on Ansonia Records Arsenio Rodríguez y Su Conjunto, (Vol.2) and on Tico Records (Arsenio Dice... Arsenio Says). Candido, a Cuban Latin-Jazz percussionist, also coached and trained Joseph on Cuban bass rhythms and syncopation. Joseph recorded with Candido as vocalist, with Tito Puente conducting and playing vibes and timbales and he often substituted with Cachao on bass, (Tico Records, Candido's Latin McGuffas Dust).

After the death of his mentor, Arsenio Rodríguez, Joseph partially retreated from performing and relocated to the Litchfield Hills of northwestern Connecticut, dedicating most of his time to composing and orchestrating. Joseph has since relocated to Richmond, Virginia and has been working with his son - film director, producer, and international instructor Josue Joseph on the international project called "La Epoca", which is about the Palladium-era in New York, and Afro-Cuban music and rhythms, as well as Mambo and Salsa as dances.
