= Introducing...Rubén González =

Introducing... Rubén González

Studio album by Rubén González
- Released: September 16, 1997
- Recorded: April 1996
- Studio: EGREM, Havana, Cuba
- Genre: Danzón; cha-cha-chá; canción; guaracha; son; bolero
- Length: 45:54
- Label: World Circuit; Nonesuch
- Producer: Nick Gold

Rubén González chronology
Rubén González (1975)	Introducing... Rubén González (1997)	Chanchullo (2000)

Professional ratings
Review scores
Source	Rating
Allmusic	link

Introducing... Rubén González is the second studio album by Cuban pianist Rubén González. It was recorded at EGREM studios in Havana, Cuba, during April 1996, as the last of the sessions that also yielded the albums A Toda Cuba le Gusta and Buena Vista Social Club. It was released on September 16, 1997, through World Circuit, thus becoming González's international debut. The album reached number seventeen on Billboard Top Latin Albums. In 2014 it was awarded a diamond certification from the Independent Music Companies Association, which indicated sales of at least 200,000 copies throughout Europe.

== Recording ==
This album was made at the end of World Circuit's three week recording session at EGREM Studios in Havana that had started in March 1996. Every morning during the recording of A Toda Cuba le Gusta (produced by Juan de Marcos González), Rubén would wait for the studio's doors to open and would rush to the piano and play. The same would happen throughout the recording of Buena Vista Social Club (produced by Ry Cooder). After these two albums were completed, Rubén was still at the piano.

It was such a beautiful piano and I had to play it. They were all my friends around so I went and started playing a tumbao. Then, Cachaíto joined me on the bass, then the rhythm started to play and it was good. But then someone turned up the lights. I thought they wanted me to stop because I was interrupting. Then I saw Nick put his thumb up and they asked me to stay.

— Rubén González, in Rubén González by Nigel Williamson.

Not only was he asked to stay, but he was invited to record his own album, to choose his own repertoire and to play for as long as he wanted. With virtually no rehearsals, the band played this collection of classic Cuban tunes, as a series of descargas (Cuban jam sessions).

== Track listing ==
1. "La engañadora" (Enrique Jorrín) – 2:32
2. "Cumbanchero" (Rafael Hernández) – 4:35
3. "Tres lindas cubanas" (Guillermo Castillo) – 5:22
4. "Melodía del río" (Rubén González) – 4:42
5. "Mandinga" (Guillermo Rodríguez Fiffe) – 8:28
6. "Siboney" (Ernesto Lecuona) – 2:32
7. "Almendra" (Abelardo Valdés) – 9:52
8. "Tumbao" (Rubén González) – 5:11
9. "Como siento yo" (Rubén González) – 2:40

== Personnel ==
=== Musicians ===
- Rubén González – piano
- Orlando "Cachaíto" López – bass
- Manuel "Guajiro" Mirabal – trumpet (1, 2, 4, 5)
- Manuel "Puntillita" Licea – vocals, background vocals
- Richard Egües – flute (3)
- Roberto García – congas, güiro, cowbell
- Carlos González – congas
- Carlos Puisseaux – güiro
- José Antonio "Maceo" Rodríguez – background vocals
- Alberto Valdés – maracas
- Amadito Valdés – timbales

=== Production ===
- Juan de Marcos González – arranger, conductor, background vocals
- Nick Gold – producer
- Jerry Boys – engineer, mixing
- Duncan Cowell – mastering
- Lucy Durán – photography, interviewer
- Cristina Piza – photography
- Kathryn Samson – cover design, sleeve design
- Nigel Williamson – liner notes

== Charts ==
Chart (1999–2000)	Peak position
Australian Albums (ARIA)	100
German Albums (Offizielle Top 100)	68

== Certifications and sales ==
Region	Certification	Certified units/sales
United Kingdom (BPI)	Silver	60,000^{^}
United States	—	228,000
Summaries
Europe	—	200,000
^{^} Shipments figures based on certification alone.
