= Joseíto González =

- Born: November 1, 1940; Matanzas, Cuba
- Died: April 3, 1997 (aged 56) Havana, Cuba
- Genres: Son cubano, bolero, guaracha
- Occupations: Musician, arranger, composer, music director
- Instrument: Piano
- Years active: 1958 – 1997
- Label: EGREM

Joseíto González (November 1, 1940 – April 3, 1997) was a Cuban pianist and director of Conjunto Rumbavana. He was a teacher of Adalberto Álvarez and a member of the late Orquesta Riverside.

== Biography ==
Born in Matanzas on November 1, 1940, his family moved to Marianao (Havana) when he was four years old. He started learning music when he was six years old, taking up the trumpet and the saxophone; in 1950 he began his piano studies at the Marianao Municipal Conservatory. After graduating, he joined the Conjunto Ritmo y Melodía, which played at the Cabaret Pennsylvania.

In the early 1960s, he started collaborating with the Conjunto Rumbavana, for which he did some arrangements. He soon became the band's pianist and director. His arrangements and Raúl Planas' vocals made the Rumbavana one of Cuba's most successful conjuntos of the 1960s and 1970s. After playing with Orquesta Riverside in the late 1980s, he toured with Omara Portuondo, Los Papines and Havana Son. He died in Havana on April 3, 1997.
