= Rubén González (album) =

- Rubén González vinyl LP cover

Studio album by Rubén González
- Released: 1975
- Recorded: 1975
- Studio: EGREM, Havana, Cuba
- Genre: Canción, cha-cha-chá, bolero, mambo, descarga, guaracha
- Length: 37:48
- Label: Areito, EGREM
- Producer: Luis Yáñez

Rubén González chronology
Rubén González (1975)	Introducing...Rubén González (1997)

Alternative cover
- Rubén González Indestructible CD cover

Professional ratings
Review scores
Source	Rating
AllMusic	link

Rubén González is the first studio album by Cuban pianist Rubén González. It was recorded and released in 1975, on Areito. The original LP was released with two different designs, one by Hipólito Cabrera featuring González on the cover, and one by Amaury Febles featuring a beach on the cover with the title Piano. It was reissued on CD by EGREM in 1997, titled Indestructible.

The album features González on piano, accompanied by a rhythm section comprising members of Enrique Jorrín's orchestra.

== Critical reception ==
In his review at AllMusic, Michael G. Nastos stated:

- "Well into his eighties before finally being discovered by the American public (via the sponsorship of Ry Cooder), Rubén González was hailed as the undisputed king of Afro-Cuban jazz piano." (…)
- "Indestructible is a series of small-group efforts with the sparest rhythm section backed by only upright bass and hand percussion. This allows his natural and organic sound to be fully heard and realized in a varied program of works from several different authors." (…)
- "On three tracks there is an unidentified organist, not credited to González but possibly overdubbed, which ups the cheese factor. Though the sound is downplayed in the mix during "Climax," some may find it annoying." (…)
- "Overall, this fine effort is one to seek and keep alongside his breakthrough CD, Introducing...Rubén González. It is a strong testament to the vitality and vision of a pianist—among a great lineage—who the world should have known much earlier in his storied career."

In his review at All About Jazz, Javier Ortiz stated:

- "If there is a music lounge in heaven, Rubén González, could perform as an Indestructible figure right up there. Wasn't this the guy that recorded in Buena Vista Social Club, and has other solo albums? Yep, but this is not quite the same thing; albeit, everything that was there is also in here, although in a different sabroso, economical and pensive mood." (…)
- "What a great way to live, and leave life... Their collective sound weaves a comfortable spiritual hammock in which to rest with ease and ponder the future, while dreaming of dancing its torrid moments with that jeva caliente you met at "El Nuevo Palladium Habanero" the other night...".

== Track listing ==
1. "Nuestra canción" (César Portillo de la Luz) – 2:32
2. "Indestructible" (Jesús Valdés, Luis Yáñez) – 2:56
3. "Mil congojas" (Juan Pablo Miranda) – 2:50
4. "Date una vueltecita" (Jorge Mazón) – 4:12
5. "Clímax" (Rubén González) – 2:43
6. "Fabiando" (Fabián García, Rubén González) – 3:52
7. "La gloria eres tú" (José Antonio Méndez) – 3:28
8. "Tu corazón otra vez" (José Antonio Pinares) – 3:16
9. "Préstame la bicicleta" (José Slater Badán) – 2:45
10. "Todo aquel ayer" (Armando Guerrero) – 3:02
11. "Yo te enseño Lola" (Emilio Cavailhón) – 3:20
12. "Como siento yo" (Rubén González) – 2:58

== Personnel ==
=== Musicians ===
- Rubén González – piano
- Fabián García – bass
- Roberto García – bongos
- Guillermo García – congas
- Gustavo Tamayo – güiro

=== Production ===
- Luis Yáñez – producer
- Ramón Alom – recording engineer (listed in original issue)
- Medardo Montero – recording engineer (listed in reissue)
- Hipólito Cabrera – design (Rubén González LP)
- Amaury Febles – design (Piano LP)
- Niurka Lecusay Guerra – CD mastering
- Bladimir Zamora Céspedes – reissue liner notes
