= Charlie Palmieri =

American musician (1927–1988)

- Also known as: "The Giant of the Keyboards"
- Born: Carlos Manuel Palmieri; November 21, 1927; South Bronx, New York, U.S.
- Died: September 12, 1988 (aged 60) South Bronx, New York, U.S.
- Genre: Salsa
- Occupations: Bandleader, musical director
- Instrument: piano
- Label: Coco

Carlos Manuel "Charlie" Palmieri (November 21, 1927 – September 12, 1988) was an American bandleader and musical director of salsa music. He was known as the "Giant of the Keyboards".

== Early years ==
Palmieri's parents migrated to New York from Ponce, Puerto Rico in 1926, and settled down in the South Bronx where Palmieri was born. As a child, Palmieri taught himself to play the piano by ear. He attended the public school system. At age seven, his father enrolled him at The Juilliard School, where he took piano lessons. By the time Palmieri was 14 years old, he and his five-year-old brother, Eddie, participated in many talent contests, often winning prizes. It was at this time that his godfather introduced him to the music of the Latin bands, an experience which inspired him to become a musician.

In 1943, when still only 16 years old and still in high school, he made his professional debut as a piano player for the Osario Selasie Band. He graduated from high school in 1946, and immediately went to play for various bands. He made his recording debut with the song "Se Va La Rumba" as a member of the Rafael Muñiz Band.

== Musical career ==
In October 1947, Tito Puente, the musical director of the Fernando Álvarez Band, was impressed with Palmieri and hired him to play for his band at the Copacabana Club; here he played with Puente until 1953 and, during the 1950s, he played with various bands. Besides having played with Tito Puente, he played with Pupi Campo's Band, and worked on Jack Paar's CBS daytime television show. Palmieri also formed a couple of bands that performed at the Palladium Ballroom. These were however short-lived because of a lack of work. During this time, he also worked as an accompanist for other bands.

Palmieri worked for several years in Chicago, but returned to New York and formed a band called Charanga La Duboney. While performing at the Monte Carlo Ballroom, Palmieri heard Johnny Pacheco playing the flute - the playing so impressed him that he hired him on the spot. The mixture of Pacheco's flute with the strings of the violins in Palmieri's band led to the 1960s Charanga craze in the United States. Palmieri was signed by the United Artists Record company and had several Latino hits. Palmieri did however suffer various setbacks - first Pacheco left the band and then United Artists cancelled his contract because of a conflict of interest with their other recording star, Tito Rodríguez. This led to Palmieri's signing with the Alegre Records label and with whom he had two best selling "hits" with "Como Bailan La Pachanga" and "La Pachanga Se Baila Así".

When the Charanga craze declined in popularity, Palmieri switched to the new trend, the boogaloo, by replacing the flute and violins with three trumpets and two trombones, he also dropped the word "Charanga" from his band's name and it became known simply as "La Duboney". In 1965, he scored a hit with Tengo Máquina y Voy a 60 (Going like 60) and in 1967 with Hay Que Estar En Algo/Either You Have It or You Don't. In 1968, Palmieri recorded Latin Bugalú under the Atlantic Records label, which was also released in the United Kingdom.

In the 1970s, Palmieri worked as the musical director for Tito Puente's television show, El Mundo de Tito Puente (Tito Puente's World). He also taught and lectured about Latin music and culture at various educational institutions. After reorganizing his band, Palmieri played the organ and recorded La Hija de Lola (Lola's Daughter) and La Vecina (The Neighbor). In 1971, he provided his organ playing talents to some of his brother's recordings. In 1978, he added the melodica to his recording The Heavyweight, an LP recorded for Alegre Records that also featured Bobby Rodríguez on bass, Quique Dávila on timbales, Papiro Allende on congas, Willie Rodríguez on bongoes, Roy Román y Lou Laurita on trumpets, Bobby Nelson on sax, Marco Katz on trombone, Harry Viggiano on tres, and the vocalists Meñique, Julito Villot, and Adalberto Santiago.

Among the artists Palmieri worked with at one time or another were his brother Eddie, Celia Cruz, Tito Puente, Herbie Mann, Ismael Rivera, Rafael Cortijo, Ismael Quintana, Bobby Capó, Mongo Santamaría, Cal Tjader, and Ray Barretto.

== Later years ==
In 1980, Palmieri moved to Puerto Rico but returned to New York for business - on one trip there he suffered a massive heart attack and stroke. He soon recovered and returned to the music world as the member of various bands. In June 1988, he debuted in the United Kingdom accompanied by London's Robin "King Salsa" Jones.

Palmieri gave private piano lessons to students at the Schuylerville Music Center in the Throggs Neck section of the Bronx in New York City. During this time he also appeared in the 1988 movie Salsa.

Four days before his death, Palmieri gave a private show at La Fortaleza in San Juan, Puerto Rico, where he performed solo at the piano for the Governor of Puerto Rico (at the time, Rafael Hernández Colón) and his guests. On September 12, 1988, Charlie Palmieri suffered another heart attack upon his arrival at New York where, as the musical director of the Joe Cuba Sextet, he was to arrange a concert. He died later that day at Jacobi Hospital in the Bronx.

== Tributes ==
External audio
- You may listen to Charlie Palmieri's "Louie's Boogaloo" on YouTube

On November 6, 2004, a Big Band Tribute to Charlie Palmieri was held at Avery Fisher Hall at the Lincoln Center for the Performing Arts. The Harbor Conservatory for the Performing Arts hosts an annual competition for the Charlie Palmieri Memorial Piano Scholarship. The winner of the competition receives a scholarship to study Latin piano music at the Conservatory. The scholarship was started by Palmieri's lifetime friend, the late Tito Puente.

Another notable friend and colleague of Palmieri's, as well as a great admirer, was the late Clare Fischer, who chose to kick off his 1989 album, Lembranças (Remembrances), with "C.P.", a piece dedicated to the composer's recently departed role model. In Fischer's words:

"C.P. - Charlie Palmieri - is dedicated to the wonderfully exciting pianist whom I have idolized for years! Charlie left us last year and the sadness I felt shows itself in some of the segments interspersed among the more spirited sections. We will miss him!"

== Discography ==
Albums

- Easy Does It (1959)
- El Gigante (1962) (aka Ravel's Bolero in Mambo) (1995)
- Cuban Rhythms (1948) (tracks by Peruchin recorded in 1951)
- Charanga (1959) (aka Let's Dance the Charanga) (1960) (featuring Johnny Pacheco)
- Pachanga at the Caravana Club (1960) Performed at the Bronx Opera House
- Viva Palmieri (1961)
- Salsa Na' Ma', Vol. 3 (1963)
- Salsa y Charanga
- Tengo Máquina y Voy a 60 (1965)
- Either You Have It Or You Don't (1966)
- Hay Que Estar En Algo / Either You Have It Or You Don't (1967)
- Latin Bugalú (1968)
- Adelante Gigante (1973)
- El Gigante del Teclado (1974)
- Electro Duro (1974)
- Impulsos (Coco Records, 1975)
- Vuelve el Gigante (1975)
- The Heavyweight (1978)
- Con Salsa y Sabor (1977)
- A Giant Step (1984)
- Mambo Show (1990) (aka The Ensemble of Latin Music Legends)
- Alegre All-Stars Vol. 1 (1961)
- Alegre All-Stars Vol. 2 - El Manicero (1964)
- Alegre All-Stars Vol. 3 - Lost and Found (1965)
- Alegre All-Stars Vol. 4 - Way Out (1966)
- Alegre All-Stars Vol. 5 - They Don't Make 'Em Like Us Anymore (1976)
- Alegre All-Stars Vol. 6 - Perdido/Te Invita (1977) (2008)
- Cesta All Stars Vol. 1 - (1975)
- Cesta All Stars Vol. 2 - (1976)

Contributing artist

- The Rough Guide to Salsa (1997, World Music Network)

With Ray Barretto

- La Cuna (CTI Records, 1979)

With Herbie Mann

- The Family of Mann (Atlantic, 1961)
- Latin Mann (Columbia, 1965)

' With Cal Tjader'

- Primo (Fantasy, 1973)

With Israel "Cachao" López

- Cachao y Su Descarga '77' (Salsoul, 1977)

With Machito Orchestra

- Fireworks (Coco Records, 1977)

With Tito Puente

- Para Los Rumberos (Tico, 1972)

With Mon Rivera

- Que Gente Averigua (Alegre, 1963)

With Celia Cruz

- Son Con Guaguanco (Tico, 1966)

With Tico Alegre All Stars

- Descargas Live at the Village Gate (Tico, 1966)

With Eddie Palmieri

- Harlem River Drive (Rhino, 1971)
- Vamonos Pal' Monte (Tico, 1971)
- Live at Sing Sing with the Harlem River Drive (Tico, 1972)
- Live in Concert at the University of Puerto Rico (Coco Records, 1973)
- Lucumi, Macumba, Voodoo (Sony, 1978)

== See also ==
- List of Puerto Ricans
- Corsican immigration to Puerto Rico
- Eddie Palmieri
