= Margarita Lecuona =

Cuban singer and composer

Margarita Lecuona

Margarita Lecuona (1910–1981) was a Cuban singer and composer who is remembered for composing afro songs such as "Babalú" and "Tabú".

== Biography ==
Born in Havana on 18 April 1910, Lecuona was the daughter of Eugenio Lecuona, the Cuban consul in New York. She attended the Colegio Nuestra Señora de las Mercedes and the Colegio Sepúlveda in Havana before embarking on her secondary education at the Instituto de La Habana which she left after her first two years. She studied singing under Julia Lucignani and the piano under Eulalia Santana before attending the Escuela de Guitarra de Pro-Arte Musical to study the guitar under Clara Romero de Nicola. She studied dance at the Escuela de Ballet under the ballet master Nikolai Yavorsky, performing in a number of his works.

In 1930, while still studying, she wrote "Soñadora" which she sang playing the guitar. After performing in a number of stage productions, in 1942, she first created a duo with Olga Luque and then a group called the Lecuona Cuban Girls, performing on stage and on the radio. Among her many compositions in the early 1940s were "Tabú" and "Babalú". "Tabú" gained popularity when performed by the percussionist Arthur Lyman and the conductor Les Baxter (both of whom recorded it under the title "Taboo", the English translation of "Tabú") while "Babalú" proved successful with the singer Desi Arnaz.

She went on to marry the Argentine actor Pepe Armil in 1947 and moved to Buenos Aires where she settled in 1957. From there she travelled to Chile, Uruguay, Bolivia, Peru, Brazil and Mexico, performing on radio as well as on the stage.

In 1969, she joined her family in the United States. She died in Bergenfield, New Jersey in 1981.
