= Harbor Conservatory for the Performing Arts =

Performing arts center in New York City

The Harbor Conservatory for the Performing Arts is a performing arts center in Spanish Harlem, New York City, USA. It provides performance space and instruction in the disciplines of theatre, music, and dance. It has been profiled in People Magazine, The New York Times, New York Daily News and in the public television documentary, Mi Mambo!.

The Conservatory hosts the annual competition to award the Charlie Palmieri Memorial Piano Scholarship, a scholarship established in Palmieri's memory by Latin musician Tito Puente for the benefit of intermediate and advanced young (12–25) pianists' study of Latin-style piano.
