= Tío Tom =

Afro-Cuban musician

Gonzalo Ascencio Hernández Kessel (5 April 1919 – 10 February 1991), known as Tío Tom (Uncle Tom), was an Afro-Cuban musician who specialized in the rumba and its variant, the guaguancó. Asencio was the author of hundreds of pieces that for decades were sung and danced by Cubans without knowing who created them, except among circles of rumba musicians. Among his most famous compositions are Changó ta veni, Mata siguaraya and Mal de yerba.

Asencio's uncertain and bohemian lifestyle was exploited by certain “professional” musicians who registered his compositions as their own, stripping him of his author's rights. Only in 1982 did musicians, writers, and disc jockeys manage to organize a tribute to him, in Havana's Plaza of the Revolution Cultural Center. Other tributes have followed ever since.

== Life and career ==
Asencio was born on 5 April 1919 in Cayo Hueso, Havana. His father, Nicanor, was a stevedore on the La Machina dock; his mother, Carmelina, a great pastry cook. Gonzalo as a child worked as shoeshine boy, newspaper peddler, bricklayer's assistant, and day laborer, while he studied in primary school. In the 1920s, the family moved to several neighborhoods, from 10 de Octubre to Carraguao (in El Cerro) and Atarés, and in the 1950s to the town of Güines. Finally, Tío settled in neighboring Guanabacoa.

Asencio was fifteen years old when he began composing. He knew by heart rumbas “from the time of Spain,” such as Tú ves, yo no lloro ("You See, I Do Not Cry"), Coco mangurria ("Mangurria Coconut"), and the one that goes: En la puerta de presidio yo vi cantar un gorrión ("At the door of a prison, I saw a sparrow sing"). The last of these would presage the sentences that awaited him, especially after he wrote ¿Dónde están los cubanos? (Where Are the Cubans?) during the administration of President Carlos Prío Socarrás (1948–1952), the time of the incident provoked by two drunken North American sailors who defaced the statue of José Martí.

He composed other controversial rumbas, such as his satire of the prevailing racism, which he titled A la fiesta de los caramelos no pueden ir los bombones ("Chocolates Cannot Go to the Caramels’ Party"). Tío earned a “bad name” for himself, and endured prison sentences for any street or backyard quarrel, up until the 1960s, when “Mongo Familia” was able once and for all to spring him from the El Príncipe prison, which the rumberos facetiously called “The Principal in the Comedy,” in reference to an historical theater in Havana. Later on, “Mongo Familia” managed to register Tío's works in Tío's own name, with the assistance of the pianist Enriqueta Almanza, who transcribed them in music notation so that Asencio could claim his composer's rights and avoid the repeated ripoffs of which he had been a victim.

In his youth, Tío Tom met many of the rumberos of the time, among them those known as Roncona, Mario Alan, Alberto Noa, Carburo, el Güinero, el Checa, and those who came along later. His voice, his dance steps, his drumstrokes, and his talent were found throughout the solares “El Palimar” (in La Víbora), “La Siguanea” (El Cerro), “El África” (Cayo Hueso), and the like in Atarés, Belén, Jesús María, Los Sitios, Pueblo Nuevo, Guanabacoa, and the rumbero neighborhoods of metropolitan Havana.

The first of Tío Tom's guaguancós to attain popularity was Mal de yerba, in which he mixed a theme of love with the titles of the most well-known Hollywood films of the time.

== Discography ==
- A Tribute to Gonzalo Asencio, "Tío Tom" by Orlando "Puntilla" Rios y El Conjunto Todo Rumbero on Smithsonian Folkways Recordings
