= Orquesta Casino de la Playa =

Orquesta Casino de la Playa, founded in 1937 in Havana, Cuba, was a band that bridged Cuban popular music, including Afro-Cuban jazz, and the big band sound of American jazz bands. The star figures until their departure for the United States in 1940 were Anselmo Sacasas (director, pianist and arranger) and Miguelito Valdés (vocals). It included collaborations with legendary tres player Arsenio Rodríguez, and launched the career of many important musicians in Cuban music. The group took its name from the name of the Havana night club where they worked. In 1948, it relocated to Mexico City.

== History ==
In the middle of 1937, RCA Victor made a variety of recordings in Havana with more than 20 groups with different formats. The recently formed Orquesta Casino de la Playa recorded six numbers, including a performance of a version of Arsenio Rodríguez' "Bruca maniguá". With these recordings, they began their growth in and outside of Cuba. Between 1937 and 1939, the band recorded over 60 songs and made several tours all along América.

In 1940, the director and pianist of the orchestra Anselmo Sacasas and the singer Miguelito Valdés left the band and traveled to the United States to develop their own projects. Sacasas was substituted by Julio Gutiérrez.

The Casino de la Playa used several singers until 1945, when the popular Cascarita joined the band. Further, Dámaso Pérez Prado played piano and arranged for the band for a short time until he left Cuba and settled in Mexico, where he developed his own vision of mambo.

== Relevance ==
The Casino de la Playa orchestra can be considered as one of the first Cuban jazz bands. This kind of band played a repertoire of Cuban songs with the characteristic sound of an American jazz band but with an emphasis on high quality singers.
