= Miguelito Valdés =

Cuban singer (1912–1978)

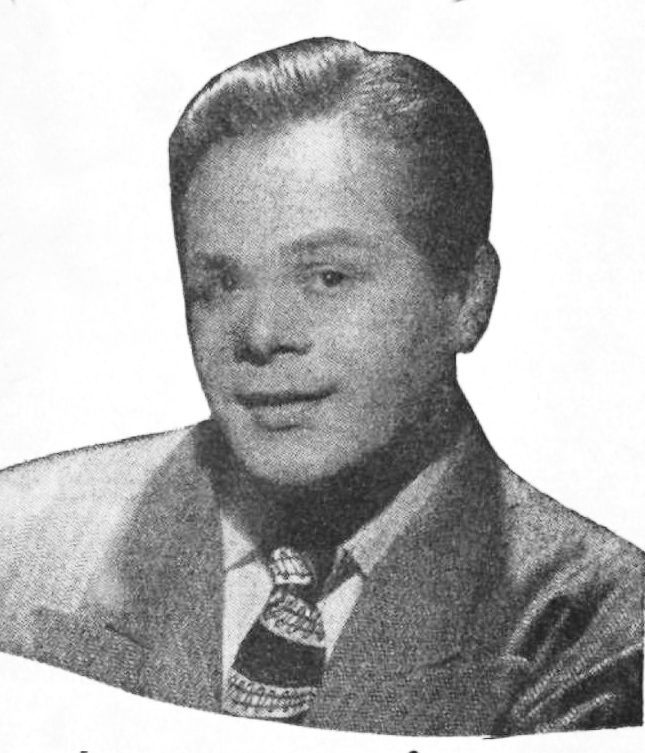
- Valdés in 1945

Background information
- Also known as: Mr. Babalú
- Born: Miguel Ángel Eugenio Lázaro Zacarías Izquierdo Valdés Hernández; September 6, 1912; Havana, Cuba
- Died: November 9, 1978 (aged 66) Bogotá, Colombia
- Genres: Son cubano, guaracha, bolero
- Occupation: Singer
- Instruments: Vocals, guitar, percussion
- Years active: 1920s–1978
- Labels: RCA Victor
- Formerly of: Orquesta Casino de la Playa, Orquesta Riverside

Miguelito Valdés (September 6, 1912 – November 9, 1978), also known as Mr. Babalú, was a renowned Cuban singer. His performances were characterized by a strong voice and a particular sense of cubanismo.

== Life ==
Miguelito Valdés was born as Miguel Ángel Eugenio Lázaro Zacarías Izquierdo Valdés Hernández on September 6, 1912 in Havana. His father was Spanish and his mother was Mexican from Yucatán. He was born in Belén (in Old Havana), and moved to another barrio, Cayo Hueso (in Centro Habana), when his father died. In his youth he worked as an auto mechanic and was a good amateur boxer. In 1934 he won the Amateur Championship of Cuba at his weight. One of his closest friends from his days in the barrio was Chano Pozo, and in his singing style he has been called "as black a white guy as you would meet in Havana". In 1936 he married Vera Eskildsen, an aristocrat from Panama City with whom he had a son, Juan Miguel Valdés Eskildsen. In 1968 he lived in Palm Springs, California.

== Career ==
He got his start in the night clubs of Havana, and first attracted renown as vocalist at the Havana-Riverside Casino. Valdés began his musical career in the Sexteto Habanero Infantil, where he played, variously, the guitar, tres, double bass, timbal and sometimes sang. Soon, his capability as a singer was realized, and from that moment he was constantly in demand. After a brief spell with María Teresa Vera's Sexteto Occidente, he was one of the founding members of the Septeto Jóvenes del Cayo in 1929. In 1933 he moved to the charanga of Ismael Díaz, and then to the Charanga Gris, directed by the pianist and composer Armando Valdés Torres, and to the Orquesta Habana, directed by Estanislao Serviá.

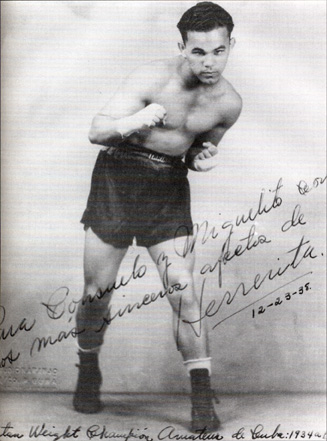
Valdés as a boxer

In 1934, he made his first journey abroad, to Panama, and on his return joined the Orquesta Hermanos Castro, which was a leading band of the day. He was their lead singer until 1936. In 1937, he joined a group of top musicians who formed the Orquesta Casino de la Playa. In June 1937 Valdés and Casino de la Playa began recording for RCA-Victor, making their debut with Bruca maniguá, a song composed by Arsenio Rodríguez. He was now perhaps the top singer in Cuba, on the verge of international fame. In 1939, La Playa toured South America and Central America. By that time, their records were highly successful all around Latin America.

In 1940, Valdés briefly joined the Orquesta Riverside (another of the big Cuban bands) before emigrating to New York City, which became his home base for the rest of his career. In New York City he worked for Orquesta Siboney de Alberto Iznaga, Xavier Cugat, Noro Morales, Tito Rodríguez and Machito. He directed his own orchestra for a few years, and made some successful recordings with it in 1949 and 1950. He appeared with Brazilian singer Delora Bueno (1925–2012) in her DuMont Television Network program Flight to Rhythm (March to September 1949).

In 1947, Valdés and his Orchestra played at the third Cavalcade of Jazz concert held at Wrigley Field in Los Angeles which was produced by Leon Hefflin, Sr. on September 7. Other performers were Woody Herman, The Blenders, T-Bone Walker, Slim Gaillard, The Honeydrippers, Johnny Otis and his Orchestra, Toni Harper, Sarah Vaughn, and the Three Blazers.

He appeared in a number of films such as You Were Never Lovelier with Fred Astaire and Rita Hayworth, and was known as "Mr. Babalú" after his performance of Margarita Lecuona's "Babalú". Valdés recorded this number with three top orchestras: Casino de la Playa in Havana, and Xavier Cugat and Machito in New York. He recorded with the renowned band Sonora Matancera in 1951 and 1977. Valdés was regarded as one of the greatest soneros and guaracheros of his time. Although non-African, his interpretation of Afro-Cuban lyrics was remarkable. In 1960, he organized a revue "Mr. Babalu", which performed in Reno, Nevada and Lake Tahoe, California. Billed were singers Loraine Barry, Marguerita Monteil and Josie Powell.

Apart from being a famous singer, he was a notable songwriter as well. Numbers he composed include "Mondongo", "Rumba rumbero", "Loco de amor", "Los tambores", "Oh, mi tambó", "Bongó", "Dolor cobarde". Films he appeared in include Mi reino por un torero, Suspense (1946), Panamericana, Imprudencia, Acapulqueña (with María Antonieta Pons), Copacabana, Mientras el cuerpo aguante, Canción para recordar and Nacido para amarte. Also listed is Bailando nace el amor (with Fred Astaire and Rita Hayworth) in 1942, which may be the Spanish-language version of You Were Never Lovelier.

He suffered a fatal heart attack on stage while singing at Hotel Tequendama, Bogota, Colombia on November 9, 1978.
