= Pedro Calvo =

Cuban singer

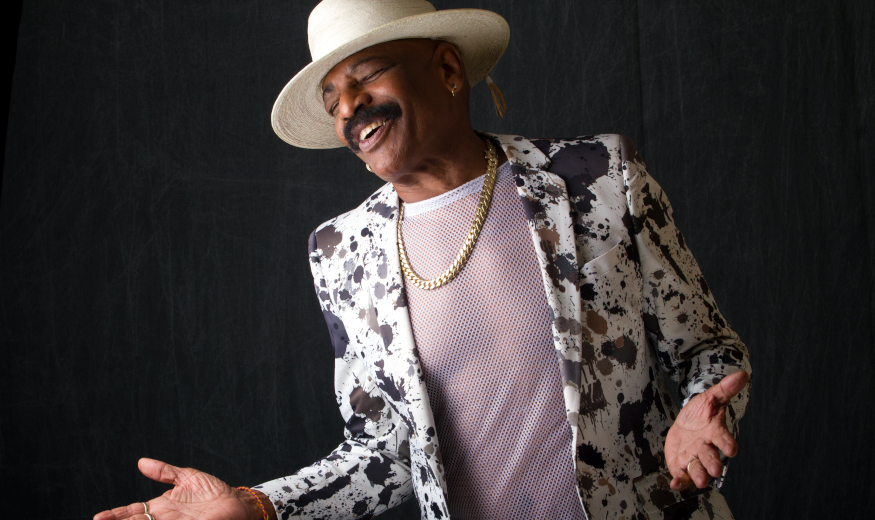

Pedro Calvo is a popular Cuban singer sometimes affectionately nicknamed Pedrito, meaning "little Pedro". He is most famous for his time with Los Van Van, one of Cuba's premier dance bands, which he joined in 1974. During the late 1990s, Calvo formed part of the famous lead singing trio of Los Van Van along with Mayito Rivera and Roberto Hernández. These three singers alternated singing the lead and backing parts on Los Van Van tracks. Some of the more notable tracks that Calvo sang the lead part on during this period are El Negro Está Cocinando, Mi Chocolate and La Fruta. Calvo was also the lead singer on Que le den Candela and Sandunguera, two famous Los Van Van tracks from an earlier period. Calvo's trademark look is a thick black moustache and wide-brimmed white hat.

In 2001, Calvo left Los Van Van to pursue his own musical career. At the time many people speculated that his departure was due to personality clashes between him and other members of the band. Calvo has since formed his own band called Pedro Calvo y La Justicia. So far the band has released three albums which have mostly been made up of remakes of some of the famous songs which Calvo sang with Los Van Van. These albums have received a mixed response from critics and have not received the same acclaim and popularity that the new albums of Los Van Van and Cesar Pedroso (another former Los Van Van musician) have had during this period.
