= La engañadora =

Single by Orquesta América de Ninón Mondéjar
- B-side: "Silver Star"
- Released: 1953
- Recorded: March 1953
- Genre: Cha-cha-cha
- Label: Panart
- Songwriter(s): Enrique Jorrín

Orquesta América de Ninón Mondéjar singles chronology
"La engañadora" (1953)	"El alardoso" (1953)

"La engañadora" (translated in the US as "Anything Can Happen When You're in Havana", "The Gay Deceiver" or simply "The Deceiver") is a song written by violinist Enrique Jorrín and first recorded by Orquesta América in March 1953. Shortly after its release it became Panart's biggest-selling single. It is widely considered the first cha-cha-cha and one of the most influential Cuban songs.

== Background and composition ==
Born in 1926 in Pinar del Río, Enrique Jorrín took up the violin at age 12. He later attended the Municipal Conservatory of Havana and by 1943 he was a member of Arcaño y sus Maravillas, Cuba's most important charanga. The band, directed by Antonio Arcaño and featuring brothers Israel López "Cachao" and Orestes López, who wrote most of the group's repertoire, was the main exponent of the danzón, a popular style of ballroom music. At the time, the López brothers were experimenting with the last section of the danzón, in which they incorporated a montuno, giving rise to the so-called danzón nuevo ritmo, the origin of the mambo. During his time with Arcaño, Jorrín grew as a danzón composer, and by the time he left the band to join Orquesta América, in the late 1940s, he was a well-respected musician.

Jorrín realized that mambo was very difficult to dance compared to other ballroom styles due to its high syncopation. Thus, he decided to alter its melody to make it more danceable and accessible. Jorrín applied this principles to "La engañadora", a song he composed in Havana sometime in 1951, the year it was first performed before an audience.

The lyrics of "La engañadora" talk about an attractive, voluptuous woman who passes through the streets of Prado and Neptuno in Havana and who captivates all men who see her; however, once it's discovered that the woman in question is actually wearing cushions under her clothes to appear curvier, all the men lose interest in her, and the lyrics state: "How foolish are the women who try to deceive us!". The song is apparently based on the real experiences of Jorrín and his friends, who used to see many women pass by the streets of Prado and Neptuno.

== Success ==
Between 1953 and 1954 it is estimated that Panart sold 13,000 copies of the single, something completely unprecedented for Cuba's first independent record label. On June 30, 1953 a cover was recorded by singer Miguelito Valdés backed by pianist René Hernández's conjunto, and billed by Seeco as a ritmo de cha cha chá. The name "cha-cha-chá" actually came from the refrain of its original B-side, "Silver Star", which also became a hit. In the original Panart issue, "La engañadora" is billed as a "mambo-rumba" and "Silver Star" as a danzón. Miguelito Valdés' cover was followed by many other versions recorded in Cuba, Mexico and the US, by artists such as René Touzet, Tito Rodríguez and Pérez Prado, establishing the song as a Cuban standard.

== Aftermath ==
After the success of "La engañadora", the popularity of Orquesta América grew as Jorrín kept writing one hit after another: "El alardoso", "Nada para ti", "El túnel"... Cha-cha-cha had eclipsed both mambo and danzón as the most popular dance style in Cuba. Jorrín claimed to be responsible for the success of Orquesta América and was uncomfortable with the band's credits, which always stated "Orquesta América de Ninón Mondéjar". He was named the orchestra's music director in 1954, but Mondéjar still insisted on receiving credit. This led to the departure of Jorrín in August 1954, forming his own band in Mexico City. In November, Mondéjar also moved along with Orquesta América to Mexico City. At this point, the only hit-making charanga in Cuba was Orquesta Aragón, which had briefly collaborated with Jorrín before his departure from Orquesta América. However, in December 1955, some members of Orquesta América returned to Havana and in January 1955 founded Orquesta América del 55.

== Personnel ==
The following musicians recorded the song during the March 1953 recording session at Panart Studios, Havana:

- Ninón Mondéjar: musical director, vocals
- Enrique Jorrín: first violin
- Antonio Sánchez Reyes "Musiquita": second violin
- Juanito Ramos: flute
- Álex Sosa: piano
- Manuel Montejo "Camagüey": double bass
- Julio Salas: tumbadora
- Augusto Barcía: timbales
- Gustavo Tamayo: güiro
