= Enrique Jorrín =

Cuban charanga violinist, composer and music director (1926–1987)

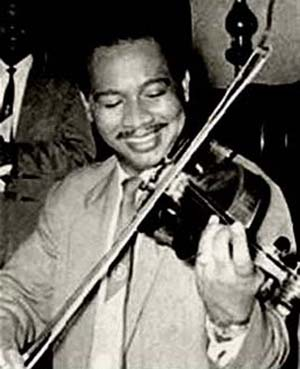
Enrique Jorrín in the 1950s.

Enrique Jorrín (December 25, 1926 – December 12, 1987) was a Cuban charanga violinist, composer and music director. He is considered the inventor of the cha-cha-chá, a popular style of ballroom music derived from danzón.

== Biography ==
Jorrín was born in Candelaria, Pinar del Río in 1926. At an early age, his family moved to the El Cerro neighborhood of Havana, where Jorrín was to live for the rest of his life. At the age of 12, he began to show a particular interest in music and decided to learn the violin. He then pursued musical studies at the Municipal Conservatory of Havana.

He started out as a violinist in the orchestra of Cuba's National Institute of Music, under the direction of González Mántici. In 1941, he became a member of the danzonera Hermanos Contreras. It was here that he became interested in popular music. Next, he joined the renowned charanga Antonio Arcaño y sus Maravillas.

In the early 1950s, while a member of Ninón Mondéjar's Orquesta América, he created a new genre of dance music which became known as the cha-cha-chá.

He lived in Mexico from 1954 to 1958 after a tour with the América. He and Félix Reina, the other violinist in the group, decided to stay. In 1964, he toured Africa and Europe with his orchestra- Orquesta de Enrique Jorrín. From 1964 onwards, he recorded extensively for the Cuban record label EGREM.

In 1974, he organized a new charanga, which included singer Tito Gómez and pianist Rubén González. This orchestra is still active in Havana and includes many songs by Jorrín in their active repertoire.

All his accomplishments were all fulfilled while raising his nephew Omar Jorrin Pineda, who grew up playing the piano for the orchestra as he got older. Omar Jorrin Pineda currently resides in a small Cuban community in New Jersey known to be Union City.

Jorrín died in Havana in 1987.

== Works ==
Among his numerous compositions are:

Danzones:

- Hilda
- Liceo del Pilar
- Central constancia
- Doña Olga
- Silver Star

Cha-cha-chás:

- Arpeando el Cha-cha-chá with Miriam de Cinca on harp
- La engañadora
- El alardoso
- El túnel
- Nada para ti
- Osiris
- Me muero

== Discography ==
- Orquesta de Enrique Jorrín; "Todo Chachacha"; Egrem CD-0044
- Orquesta Enrique Jorrín; "Por Siempre Jorrín"; Egrem CD-0644
