= Anselmo Sacasas =

Anselmo Sacasas (23 November 1912 – 22 January 1998) was a Cuban jazz pianist, bandleader, composer, and arranger. As a pianist he took inspiration from Cuban tres players like Arsenio Rodríguez, adapting their techniques to his own style as a soloist in orchestras playing Cuban music.

He began to learn piano at the age of 6 from a female cousin, and 10 years later graduated from the music conservatory in Manzanillo. He later moved to Havana, where he composed piano pieces for silent films and developed an interest in the danzón style. In the early 1930s he was a member of Tata Pereira's orchestra.

In 1936 he met the singer Miguelito Valdés, with whom he would work in the Orquesta de los Hermanos Castro. Shortly after they established the Orquesta Casino de la Playa. This band, propelled by Sacasas’s signature jazz arrangements and piano improvisations, revolutionized the Cuban music scene. Performing live daily on Cuban national radio station CMQ, they quickly became the most renowned and respected orchestra in Cuba and the Caribbean. The orchestra toured Central and South America and appeared on film in both Cuba and the United States.

In 1940, Sacasas left Cuba for the United States, where after some brief difficulty he was able to establish his own orchestra in 1941. During the 1940’s Sacasas and his orchestra performed at the Colony Club in Chicago and the cabarets La Conga Club, the iconic La Martinique as well as the renowned Havana Madrid in Manhattan, from which they were featured live on a weekly radio program transmitted nationally by the Mutual Broadcast System.

Sacasas moved to Miami in 1949 when he became the musical director of the Sans Souci Hotel and performed in the Blue Sails Room. In 1954 he became the musical director of the Fountainbleu Hotel in Miami and performed in the Club La Ronde. In 1963 he became the musical director of the El San Juan Hotel in San Juan, Puerto Rico and the Tropicoro nightclub where he performed for thirteen years. In 1976 Sacasas retired from performing and settled in Miami where he continued to compose music until his death in 1998.

== Personal life ==
Anselmo Sacasas was married to Orlanda Soto (1919-2003) from 1937 until his death in 1998. They were the parents of a daughter, Rosario Sacasas (1938-1990) and a son, René Sacasas (1947 - ).

== Discography ==
- In the Hall of the Mambo King (2002 CD)
- 1942-1944 (1996 CD)
- Sol Tropical "1945-1949"
- Anselmo Sacasas "1942-44" (Harlequin, 1996)
- Anselmo Sacasas "Poco Loco: 1945-1949" (Tumbao, 1995)
