= Conjunto Rumbavana =

Cuban band

Conjunto Rumbavana is a Cuban band founded in 1955, directed by pianist Joseíto González. Its repertoire included popular music like bolero, guaracha, chachachá, son montuno, conga, and danzón. Singers have included Guido Soto, Oreste Macias, Fernando Alvarez, Raul Plana, Onelio, Ricardito, and Lino Borge.

The band's album, Dejale Que Baile Sola, received a three-star rating from AllMusic.
