= Puntillita =

Cuban musician

Manuel "Puntillita" Licea (Manuel Licea Lamouth; December 4, 1921 in Yareyal, Holguín – December 4, 2000 in Havana) was a Cuban popular singer. Puntillita was active in the 1940s and 1950s, and later gained notice when he joined other elderly Cuban musicians to form the Afro-Cuban All Stars and the associated group of singers who recorded the Buena Vista Social Club with American guitarist Ry Cooder.

== Career ==
Puntillita was a member of the Hermanos Licea in the 1940s in Camagüey. He began singing with the Orquesta Escorcia, and played percussion in the Orquesta Tentación. In 1945 he went to Havana to sing in trumpeter Julio Cueva's band. He got his nickname from Son de la puntillita, which he sang with this band. He went on to achieve huge popularity in the 1950s as a soloist on Radio Cadena Habana. In Mexico City he performed at El Patio, singing with Celia Cruz and Beny Moré. With the conjunto Gloria Matancera he played at the Cabaret Antillano.

In the 1990s, Juan de Marcos González approached Puntillita to join the Afro-Cuban All Stars, which featured many musicians from Havana's pre-revolutionary era. He toured Colombia and Europe with the group. Puntillita was also later asked by Gonzalez to appear with Ry Cooder in the Buena Vista Social Club. Puntillita sang with Ibrahim Ferrer and guitarist Eliades Ochoa on Cuarto de Tula and sang lead on La Bayamesa, the Cuban national anthem. The record won a Grammy in 1998. He died in 2000, aged 79.

== See also ==
- Ibrahim Ferrer
- Rubén González
- Compay Segundo
