= Félix Baloy =

Cuban musician

Félix Baloy (born November 12, 1944 in Mayari, Holguín, Cuba) is a Cuban singer, sonero, and percussionist.

He has a Havana urban accent. He has been a vocalist with many groups, including Chappotin y Sus Estrellas, Revé, and Adalberto Alvarez y su Son, and most recently, the Afro-Cuban All Stars. He was one of the original members of the Afro-Cuban All Stars.

He also sang on the compilation album Café Cubano, produced through Putumayo World Music.

He has at least three solo albums, Baila Mi Son (2000), Un Poquito de Fé (2005), and Un Solo Amor (2008).

One reviewer described him as famous in Cuba but virtually unknown elsewhere, although he had hits in the 1970s. Another reviewer described him as one of the most important soneros of the 1970s and 1980s.

His music has a message of standing up and speaking out for freedom and one's rights, a message which has been hailed as a response to colonialism.
