= Sierra Maestra (band) =

Band

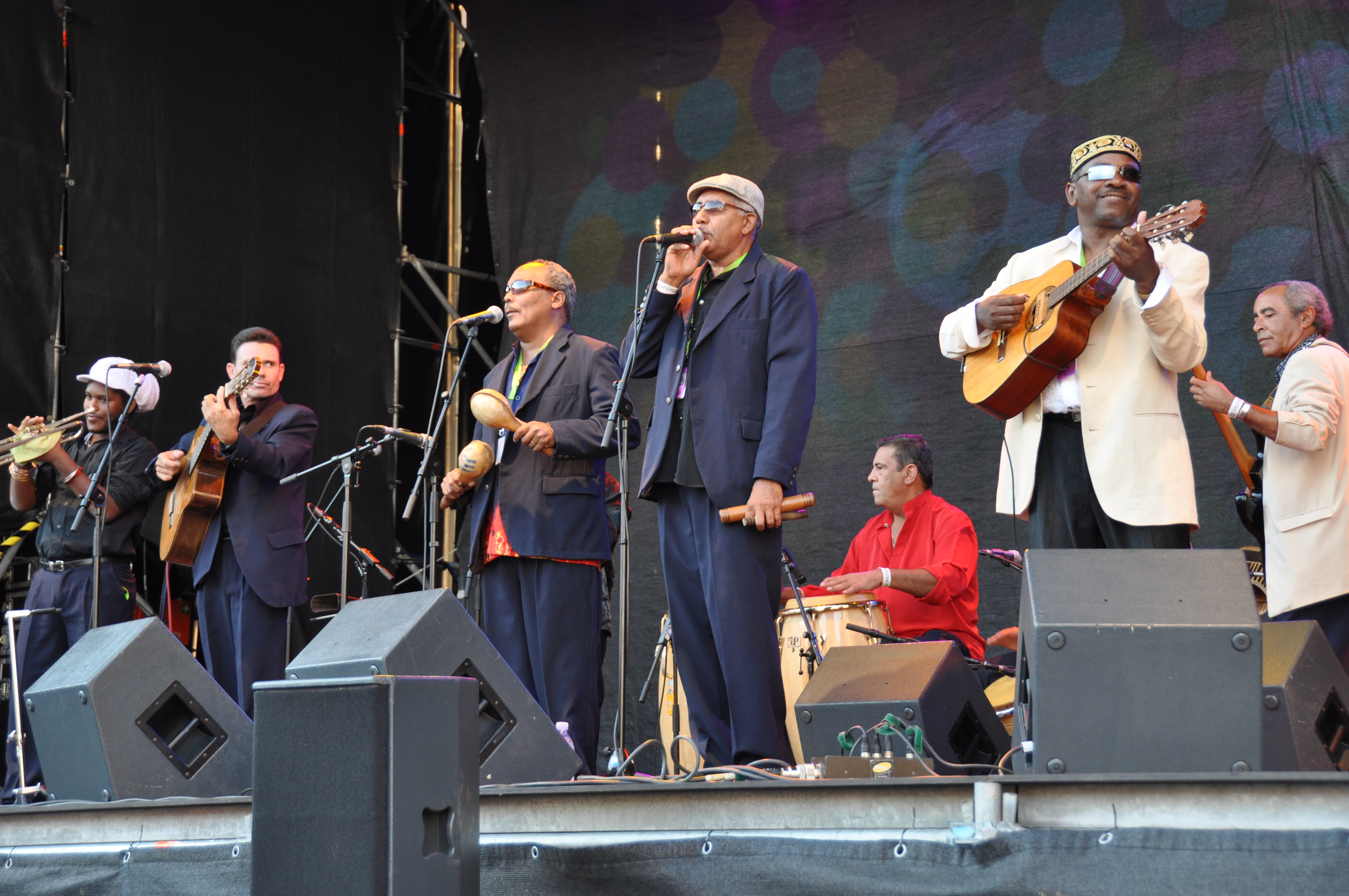
- In concert at Nuremberg, Germany, in 2010

Background information
- Genres: Son
- Years active: 1976–present
- Past members: Juan de Marcos González; Jesús Alemañy; José Antonio "Maceo" Rodríguez

Sierra Maestra are a Cuban band started in 1976. They sought to revive 1920s classic son, which came from the mountain range on the east of Cuba, after which the band was named.

Their members included Juan de Marcos Gonzalez—before he left to create the Afro-Cuban All Stars in 1996—José Antonio "Maceo" Rodríguez, and Jesús Alemañy, who would go on to form the band ¡Cubanismo!, also in 1996.

Sierra Maestra performed at the Glastonbury Festival (UK) in 2008.

== Discography ==
- Con Sabor a Cuba (1994)
- ¡dundunbanza! (1994)
- El Guanajo Relleno (1995)
- Tibiri Tabara (1997)
- Rumbero Soy (2002)
- Son: Soul Of A Nation (2005)

Contributing artist

- The Rough Guide to the Music of Cuba (1998, World Music Network)
