= Arsenio Rodríguez =

Cuban musician, composer and bandleader (1911–1970)

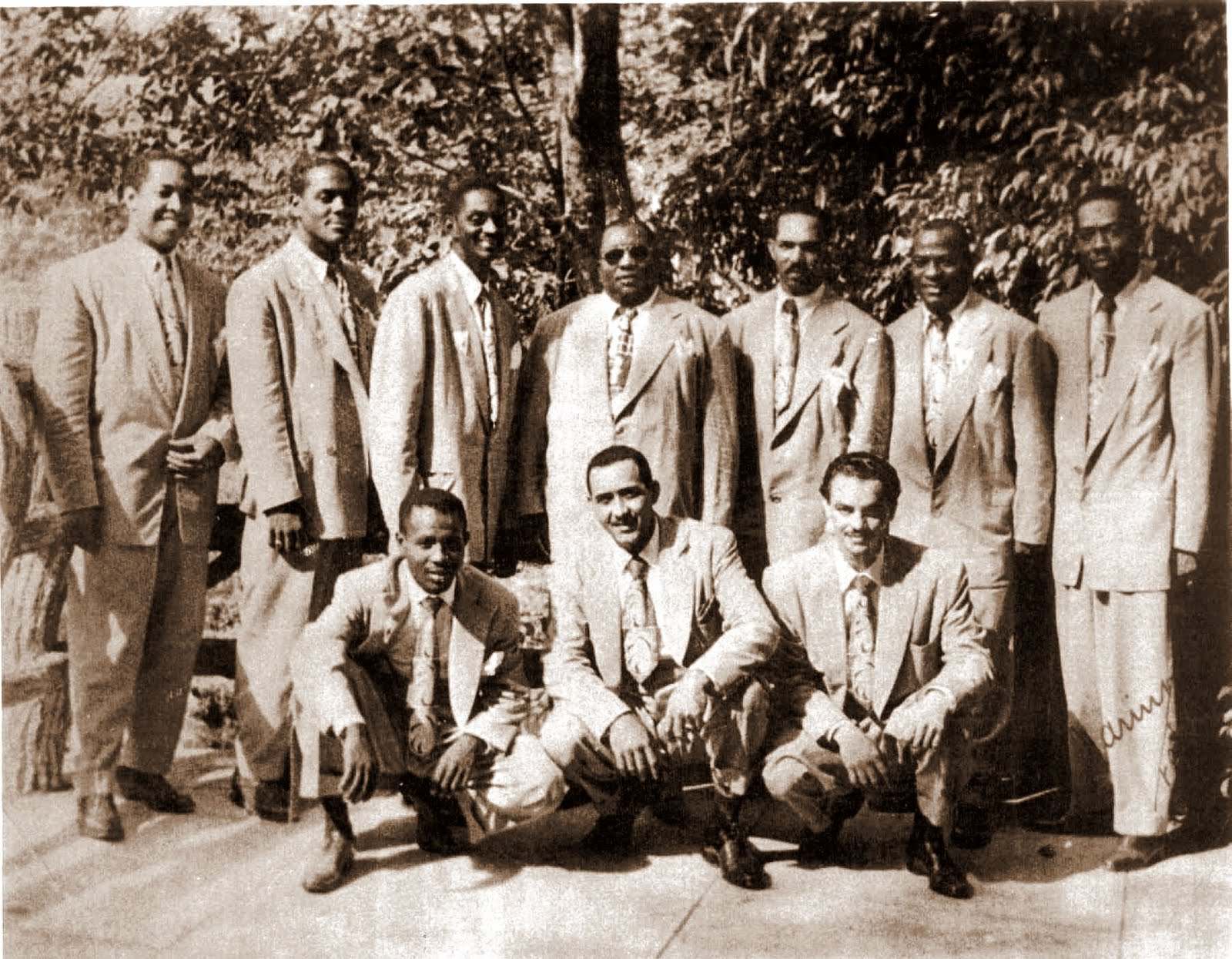
- Arsenio Rodríguez (center, standing) and his conjunto in the 1940s.

Background information
- Also known as: El Ciego Maravilloso
- Born: Ignacio Arsenio Travieso Scull; August 31, 1911; Güira de Macurijes, Matanzas, Cuba
- Origin: Havana, Cuba
- Died: December 30, 1970 (aged 59) Los Angeles, California, United States
- Genres: Son montuno; guaguancó; guaracha; bolero; afro
- Occupations: Musician; bandleader; composer
- Instruments: Tres; tumbadora
- Years active: 1929-1970
- Labels: Victor; SMC Pro-Arte; Puchito; Seeco; Ansonia; Tico; Epic

Arsenio Rodríguez (born Ignacio Arsenio Travieso Scull; August 31, 1911 – December 30, 1970) was a Cuban musician, composer and bandleader. He played the tres, as well as the tumbadora, and he specialized in son, rumba and other Afro-Cuban music styles. In the 1940s and 1950s Rodríguez established the conjunto format and contributed to the development of the son montuno, the basic template of modern-day salsa. He claimed to be the true creator of the mambo and was an important as well as a prolific composer who wrote nearly two hundred songs.

Despite being blind since the age of seven, Rodríguez quickly managed to become one of Cuba's foremost treseros. His first hit, "Bruca maniguá" by Orquesta Casino de la Playa, came as a songwriter in 1937. For the following two years Rodríguez worked as composer and guest guitarist for the Casino de la Playa. In 1940 he formed his conjunto, one of the first of its kind. After recording over a hundred songs for RCA Victor over the course of twelve years, Rodríguez moved to New York in 1952, where he remained active, releasing several albums. In 1970, Rodríguez moved to Los Angeles, where he died of pneumonia.

== Life and career ==
=== Early life ===
Ignacio Arsenio Travieso Scull was born on August 31, 1911, in Güira de Macurijes in Bolondrón (Pedro Betancourt), Matanzas Province. He was the third of fifteen children, fourteen boys and one girl, to Bonifacio Travieso, a farmer and veteran of the Cuban War of Independence, and Dorotea Rodríguez Scull. His family had Kongo origins, and both his grandfather and great-grandfather were practitioners of Palo Monte. By the time Arsenio was four, in 1915, his family moved to the town of Güines, where his three younger siblings (Estela, Israel "Kike" and Raúl) were born. In 1918, at around seven years of age, Arsenio was blinded when a horse kicked him in the head after he accidentally hit the animal with a broom. This tragic event prompted Arsenio to become very close with his brother Kike, and to become interested in writing and performing songs.

The young brothers began playing the tumbadora at rumba performances in Matanzas and Güines, and became also immersed in the traditions of Palo Monte and its secular counterpart, yuka. Furthermore, their neighbour in the neighbourhood of Leguina, Güines, was a Santería practitioner who hosted celebrations for Changó, exposing Arsenio and Kike to West African drumming and chanting. In rural parties such as guateques, they also learned the son, a genre of music that originated in the eastern region of the island. Arsenio learned how to play the marímbula and the botija, two rudimentary instruments used in the rhythm section, and more importantly he took up the tres, a small guitar, now considered Cuba's national instrument. He received classes from Víctor González, a renowned tresero from Güines.

Following the destruction of their home by a Category 4 hurricane in 1926, Arsenio and his family moved from Güines to Havana, where he started playing in local groups around Marianao (his older brother Julio had already been living and working there). By 1928 he had formed the Septeto Boston which often performed in third-tier, working-class cabarets in the area. His father died in 1933 and sometime in the early 1930s, Arsenio changed his stage name from Travieso (which means "mischievous" or "naughty") to his mother's maiden name, Rodríguez, a fairly common Spanish surname. After dissolving the unsuccessful Septeto Boston in 1934, Rodríguez joined the Septeto Bellamar, directed by his uncle-in-law José Interián and featuring his cousin Elizardo Scull on vocals. The group often played at dance academies such as Sport Antillano.

=== Rise to fame ===
By 1938, Rodríguez was the de facto musical director of the Septeto Bellamar and his name had become familiar to important figures such as Antonio Arcaño and Miguelito Valdés. His acquaintance with the latter made it possible for one of his songs, "Bruca maniguá", to be recorded by the famous Orquesta Casino de la Playa in June 1937. The song, featuring Valdés on vocals, became an international hit and Rodríguez's breakthrough composition. The band also recorded Rodríguez's "Ben acá Tomá" in the same recording session, becoming their next A-side. In 1938 they recorded "Yo son macuá", "Funfuñando" (also a hit) and "Se va el caramelero", which included Rodríguez's first recorded performance, a remarkable solo on the tres.

In 1940, on the wave of his success with Casino de la Playa, Rodríguez formed his own conjunto, which featured three singers (playing claves, maracas and guitar), two trumpets, tres, piano, bass, tumbadora and bongo. At the time, only two other conjuntos existed: Conjunto Casino and Alberto Ruiz's Conjunto Kubavana. This type of ensemble would replace the former septetos, although some such as the Septeto Nacional would perform on and off for years. Of all the conjuntos, Arsenio Rodríguez's became the most successful and critically acclaimed one during the 1940s. His popularity earned him the nickname El Ciego Maravilloso (The Blind Marvel). The first single by his conjunto was "El pirulero no vuelve más", a pregón which tried to capitalize on the success of "Se va el caramelero".

In 1947, Rodríguez went to New York for the first time. There, he hoped to get cured of his blindness but eye specialist Ramón Castroviejo was told that his optic nerves had been completely destroyed. This experience led him to compose the bolero "La vida es un sueño" (Life is a dream). He returned to New York in 1948 and 1950 before establishing himself in the city in 1952. He played with influential artists such as Chano Pozo, Machito, Dizzy Gillespie and Mario Bauzá. On March 18, 1952, Rodríguez made his final recordings with his band for RCA Victor in Cuba. He finally left Havana on March 22, 1952, having handed the direction of the conjunto to trumpeter Félix Chappottín. Chappottín and the other remaining members, including pianist Lilí Martínez and singer Miguelito Cuní, formed Conjunto Chappottín. He would return to Havana for the last time in 1956.

=== Later life and death ===
During the 1960s, the mambo craze petered out, and Rodríguez continued to play in his typical style, although he did record some boogaloo numbers, without much success. As times changed, the popularity of his group declined. He tried a new start in Los Angeles. He invited his friend Alfonso Joseph to fly out to Los Angeles with him but died there only a week later, on December 30, 1970, from pneumonia. His body was returned for burial to New York. There is much speculation about his financial status during his last years, but Mario Bauzá denied that he died in poverty, arguing that Rodríguez had a modest income from royalties.

== Innovations ==
Rodríguez's chief innovation, his interpretation of the son montuno, established the basic template for Cuban popular dance music and salsa that continues to this day. "It took fifty years for Latin music to catch up with what Arsenio was doing in the 1940s"—Kevin Moore (2007: web).

=== Clave-based structure and offbeat emphasis ===
The decades of the 1920s and 1930s were a period which produced some of the most beautiful and memorable melodies of the son genre. At the same time, the rhythmic component had become increasingly deemphasized, or in the opinion of some, "watered-down". Rodríguez brought a strong rhythmic emphasis back into the son. His compositions are clearly based on the key pattern known in Cuba as clave, a Spanish word for 'key', or 'code'.

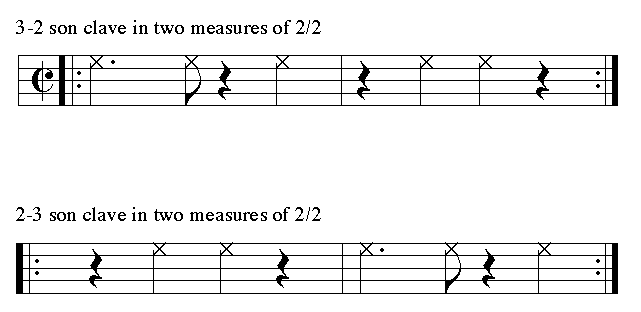
3-2 clave and 2-3 clave written in cut-time.

When clave is written in two measures, as shown above, the measure with three strokes is referred to as the three-side, and the measure with two strokes—the two-side. When the chord progression begins on the three-side, the song, or phrase is said to be in 3-2 clave. When it begins on the two-side, it's in 2-3 clave. The 2-3 bass line of "Dame un cachito pa' huele" (1946) coincides with the three-side of the clave's five-note pattern. David García identifies the accents of "and-of-two" (in cut-time) on the three-side, and the "and-of-four" (in cut-time) on the two-side of the clave, as crucial contributions of Rodríguez's music. The two offbeats are present in the following 2-3 bass line from Rodríguez's "Mi chinita me botó" (1944).

The two offbeats are especially important because they coincide with the two syncopated steps in the son's basic footwork. The conjunto's collective and consistent accentuation of these two important offbeats gave the son montuno texture its unique groove and, hence, played a significant part in the dancer's feeling the music and dancing to it, as Bebo Valdés noted "in contratiempo" ['offbeat timing']

— García (2006: 43).

Moore points out that Rodríguez's conjunto introduced the two-celled bass tumbaos, that moved beyond the simpler, single-cell tresillo structure. This type of bass line has a specific alignment to clave, and contributes melodically to the composition. Rodríguez's brother Raúl Travieso recounted, Rodríguez insisted that his bass players make the bass "sing." Moore states: "This idea of a bass tumbao with a melodic identity unique to a specific arrangement was critical not only to timba, but also to Motown, rock, funk, and other important genres." In other words, Rodríguez is a creator of the bass riff.

Breaks ('cierres')

Rodríguez's "Juventud amaliana" (1946) contains an example of one of his rhythmically dynamic unison breaks, strongly rooted in clave.

Most of Arsenio's classic tracks from the golden period of 1946-1951 feature a virtuousic and highly-polyrhythmic solo by either Luis "Lilí" Martínez Griñán on piano, Arsenio himself on tres, or occasionally Félix Chappottín or one of the other trumpeters. The solo usually ends with Arsenio's signature [break] lead-in phrase: . X X X X . . . [first measure in the example above]. The figure is usually played on the two-side in 3-2 clave and on the three-side in 2-3 clave, and leads directly to what most timba musicians call a bloque but which in Arsenio's day was called a cierre. It consists of everyone in the band playing the same series of punches, creating extreme rhythmic tension with a combination of cross-rhythms and deceptive harmonies. As [David] García points out, the first four beats of the actual [break] have a rhythm [below] which was used repeatedly in the subsequent decades, most famously by Tito Puente and later Carlos Santana in "Oye Como Va

— Moore (2007).

Moore is referring to the second and third measures of the break in the previous example. Here is that figure in relation to 2-3 clave. When the pattern is used as a type of block chord guajeo, as in "Oye Como Va", it's referred to as ponchando.

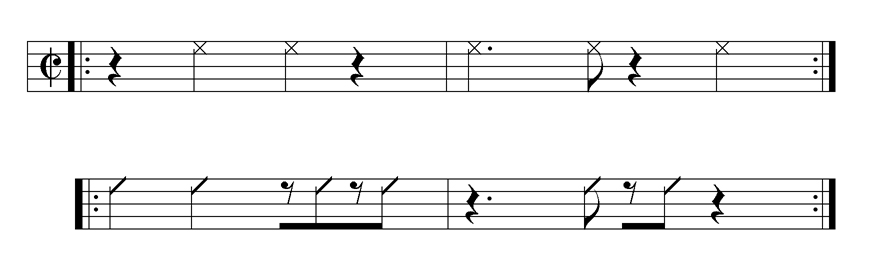
2-3 clave (top) with ponchando figure (bottom).

=== Layered guajeos ===
Rodríguez introduced the idea of layered guajeos (typical Cuban ostinato melodies)—an interlocking structure consisting of multiple contrapuntal parts. This aspect of the son's modernization can be thought of as a matter of "re-Africanizing" the music. Helio Orovio recalls: "Arsenio once said his trumpets played figurations the 'Oriente' tres-guitarists played during the improvisational part of el son" (1992: 11). Oriente is the easternmost province of Cuba, where the son was born. It is common practice for treseros to play a series of guajeo variations during their solos. Perhaps it was only natural then that it was Rodríguez, the tres master, who conceived of the idea of layering these variations on top of each other. The following example is from the "diablo" section of Rodríguez's "Kila, Quique y Chocolate" (1950). The excerpt consists of four interlocking guajeos: piano (bottom line), tres (second line), 2nd and 3rd trumpets (third line), and 1st trumpet (fourth line). 2-3 Clave is shown for reference (top line). Notice that the piano plays a single celled (single measure) guajeo, while the other guajeos are two-celled. It's common practice to combine single and double-celled ostinatos in Afro-Cuban music.

During the 1940s, the conjunto instrumentation was in full swing, as were the groups who incorporated the jazz band (or big band) instrumentation in the ensemble, guajeos (vamp-like lines) could be divided among each instrument section, such as saxes and brass; this became even more subdivided, featuring three or more independent riffs for smaller sections within the ensemble. By adopting polyrhythmic elements from the son, the horns took on a vamp-like role similar to the piano montuno and tres (or string) guajeo

— Mauleón (1993: 155).

=== Expansion of the son conjunto ===
The denser rhythmic weave of Rodríguez's music required the addition of more instruments. Rodríguez added a second, and then, third trumpet—the birth of the Latin horn section. He made the bold move of adding the conga drum, the quintessential Afro-Cuban instrument. Today, we are so used to seeing conga drums in Latin bands, and that practice began with Rodríguez. His bongo player used a large, hand-held cencerro ('cowbell') during montunos (call-and-response chorus sections). Rodríguez also added a variety of rhythms and harmonic concepts to enrich the son, the bolero, the guaracha and some fusions, such as the bolero-son. Similar changes had been made somewhat earlier by the Lecuona Cuban Boys, who (because they were mainly a touring band) had less influence in Cuba. The overall 'feel' of the Rodríguez conjunto was more African than other Cuban conjuntos.

=== Piano guajeos ===
Rodríguez took the pivotal step of replacing the guitar with the piano, which greatly expanded the contrapuntal and harmonic possibilities of Cuban popular music.

"Como traigo la yuca", popularly called "Dile a Catalina", recorded in 1941 and Arsenio's first big hit, may be his most famous composition. The first half uses the changüí/son method of paraphrasing the vocal melody but the second half strikes out into bold new territory – using contrapuntal material not based on the song's melody and employing a cross-rhythm based on sequences of three ascending notes

— Moore (2011: 39).

The piano guajeo for "Dame un cachito pa' huele" (1946) completely departs from both the generic son guajeo and the song's melody. The pattern marks the clave by accenting the backbeat on the two-side. Moore observes: "Like so many aspects of Arsenio's music, this miniature composition is decades ahead of its time. It would be forty years before groups began to consistently apply this much creative variation at the guajeo level of the arranging process" (2009: 41).

"No me llores más" [1948] stands out for its beautiful melodies and the incredible amount of emotional intensity it packs into its ultra‐slow 58 bpm groove. The guajeo is based on the vocal melody and marks the clave relentlessly

— Moore (2009: 48).

The piano guajeo for "Jumba" (a.k.a. "Zumba") (1951) is firmly aligned with clave, but also has a very strong nengón flavor — something which had rarely, or never, been used in Havana popular music. While Rodríguez was not from Oriente province (where nengón and changüí are played), he had a thorough knowledge of many folkloric styles and his creative partner, the pianist/composer Luis "Lilí" Martínez Griñán, in fact came from that part of the island.

Arsenio's use of modal harmonies pre-echoes not only songo, salsa, and timba, but rock and soul as well. "Guaragüí" [1951] has not one but two shockingly original chord progressions. [The guajeo] is in D, but the chord progression is in the Mixolydian mode: I – bVII – IV (D – C – G). This virulently addictive little sequence would remain dormant for fifteen years until becoming a pop juggernaut in songs such as "Hey Jude" and "Sympathy for the Devil". In the early 70s, when Juan Formell of Los Van Van reintroduced it to Latin pop, it sounded like a clear borrowing from rock & roll, but here it is in Arsenio's music when rock and rollers were limited to I – IV – V and I – vimi – IV – V, and even Tin Pan Alley had yet to incorporate modal harmonies. Equally interesting from a harmonic standpoint, is "Guaragüí'"s opening progression: imi – IV – bVII – imi (Ami – D – G – Ami). It's the same progression, but in minor, with the IV and bVII inverted

— Moore (2009: 53).

=== Diablo, the proto-mambo? ===
Leonardo Acosta is not convinced by Rodríguez's claim to have invented the mambo, if by mambo Rodríguez meant the big-band arrangements of Dámaso Pérez Prado. Rodríguez was not an arranger: his lyrics and musical ideas were worked over by the group's arranger. The compositions were published with just the minimal bass and treble piano lines. To achieve the big-band mambo such as by Pérez Prado, Machito, Tito Puente or Tito Rodríguez requires a full orchestration where the trumpets play counterpoint to the rhythm of the saxophones. This, a fusion of Cuban with big-band jazz ideas, is not found in Rodríguez, whose musical forms are set in the traditional categories of Cuban music.

While it is true that the mambo of the 1940s, and 1950s contains elements not present in Rodríguez's music, there is considerable evidence that the contrapuntal structure of the mambo began in the conjunto of Arsenio Rodríguez. While working in the charanga Arcaño y Sus Maravillas, Orestes López "Macho" and his brother Israel López "Cachao" composed "Mambo" (1938), the first piece to use the term. A prevalent theory is that the López brothers were influenced by Rodríguez's use of layered guajeos (called diablo), and introduced the concept into the charanga's string section with their historical composition.

As Ned Sublette observes: "Arsenio maintained till the end of his life that the mambo — the big band style that exploded in 1949 — came out of his diablo, the repeating figures that the trumpets in the band played. Arsenio claimed to have already been doing that in the late 1930s" (2004: 508). As Rodríguez himself asserts: "In 1934, I was experimenting with a new sound which I fully developed in 1938." Max Salazar concurs: "It was Arsenio Rodríguez's band that used for the first time the rhythms which today are typical for every mambo" (1992: 10). In an early article on mambo, published in 1948, the writer Manuel Cuéllar Vizcaíno suggests that Rodríguez and Arcaño's styles emerged concurrently, which might account for the decades-long argument concerning the identity of the "true" inventor of the mambo. In the late 1940s Pérez Prado codified the contrapuntal structure of the mambo within a horn-based big band format.

Throughout the 1940s Arsenio's son montuno style was never referred to as mambo, even though central principles and procedures of his style, such as playing in contratiempo (against the beat), are to be found in mambo. What had made the conjunto and son montuno style so innovative was in fact Arsenio's and his musicians' deep knowledge and utilization of aesthetic principles and performance procedures rooted in Afro-Cuban traditional music in which Arsenio had been immersed as a youngster in rural areas of Matanzas and La Habana. Drawing from these principles and procedures, Arsenio and his colleagues formulated new ways of performing Cuban son and danzón music that arrangers for big bands soon after adapted and popularized internationally as mambo

— García (2006: 42).

== Style ==
Rodríguez's style was characterized by a strong Afro-Cuban basis, his son compositions being much more africanized than those by his contemporaries. This emphasis is observed in the high number of rumba and afro numbers in his catalogue, most notably his first famous composition, "Bruca maniguá". This is also exemplified by the inclusion of musical and linguistic elements from Abakuá, Lucumí (Santería), and Palo Monte traditions into his music.

Arsenio uses proverbs associated with Palo Monte and other traditional passages with Congo lexical passages... Arsenio's afrocubanos demonstrate not only the extent of his knowledge of Palo Monte spirituality but also his critique of the discourse on African inferiority and atavismas (1) manifested in racist representational tropes in Cuban popular culture and (2) implied in the ideology of mestizaje (read: racial and cultural "progress"). As he countered in his afrocubanos, these traditions of his youth, through representing a "primitive" era for most of the white Cuban elite as well as black intellectuals, continued to be a vital and powerful aspect of his music and life

— García (1006: 21).

On Palo Congo by Sabú Martínez (1957) Rodríguez sings and plays a traditional palo song and rhythm, a Lucumí song for Eleggua, and a rumba and a conga de comparsa accompanied by tres. Rodríguez's 1963 landmark album Quindembo features an abakuá tune, a columbia, and several band adaptations of traditional palo songs, accompanied by the bona fide rhythms.

Rodríguez was an authentic rumbero; he both played the tumbadora and composed songs within the rumba genre, especially guaguancós. Rodríguez recorded folkloric rumbas and also fused rumba with son montuno. His "Timbilla" (1945) and "Anabacoa" (1950) are examples of the guaguancó rhythm used by a son conjunto. On "Timbilla", the bongós fulfill the role of the quinto (lead drum). In "Yambú en serenata" (1964) a yambú using a quinto is augmented by a tres, bass, and horns.

In 1956, Rodríguez released the folkloric rumbas "Con flores del matadero" and "Adiós Roncona" in Havana. The tracks consist of voice and percussion only. One of the last recordings Rodríguez performed on was the rumba album Patato y Totico by the conguero Carlos "Patato" Valdés and vocalist Eugenio "Totico" Arango (1967). The tracks are purely folkloric, except for the unconventional addition of Rodríguez on tres and Israel López "Cachao" on bass. Additional personnel included Papaíto and Virgilio Martí. Also released in the 1960s, the album Primitivo, featuring Monguito el Único and Baby González alternating on lead vocals, is an evocation of the music played in the solares.

== Tributes ==
There have been numerous tributes to Arsenio Rodríguez, especially in the form of LPs. In 1972, Larry Harlow recorded Tribute to Arsenio Rodríguez (Fania 404) with his band Orchestra Harlow. On this LP, five of the numbers had been recorded earlier by Rodríguez' conjunto. In 1994, the Cuban revivalist band Sierra Maestra recorded Dundunbanza! (World Circuit WCD 041), an album containing four Rodríguez numbers, including the title track.

Arsenio Rodríguez is mentioned in a national television production called La época, about the Palladium era in New York, and Afro-Cuban music. The film discusses Arsenio's contributions, and features some of the musicians he recorded with. Others interviewed in the movie include the daughter of legendary Cuban percussionist Mongo Santamaría – Ileana Santamaría, bongocero Luis Mangual and others.

Rodríguez's close friend and bassist for eight years Alfonso "El Panameño" Joseph, as well as other members of Rodríguez's band, such as Julián Lianos, who performed with Rodríguez at the Palladium Ballroom in New York during the 1960s, have had their legacies documented in a national television production called La Época, released in theaters in the US in September 2008, and in Latin America in 2009. He had much success in the US and migrated there in 1952, one of the reasons being the better pay of musicians.

Starting in the late 1990s, jazz guitarist Marc Ribot recorded two albums mostly of Rodríguez' compositions or songs in his repertoire:Marc Ribot y los Cubanos Postizos (or Marc Ribot and the Prosthetic/Fake Cubans) and Muy Divertido!. In 1999, Rodríguez was posthumously inducted into the International Latin Music Hall of Fame.

Belatedly, the borough of the Bronx officially had the intersection of Intervale Ave. and Dawson St. in the area known as Longwood renamed "Arsenio Rodríguez Way" in a dedication and unveiling ceremony on Thursday, June 6, 2013.

"That intersection was the center of his universe," said José Rafael Méndez, a community historian. "He lived in that area. And all the clubs he played, like the Hunts Point Palace, were practically a stone's throw away."

The street designation serves as the crowning jewel after an arduous series of collaborative efforts and events produced last year that rendered tribute to the band leader and resident performer of the Longwood community.

== Notable compositions ==
The following songs composed by Arsenio Rodríguez are considered Cuban standards:

- "Bruca maniguá"
- "El reloj de Pastora"
- "Monte adentro"
- "Dundunbanza"
- "Como traigo la yuca" (also known as "La yuca de Catalina" or "Dile a Catalina")
- "Fuego en el 23"
- "Meta y guaguancó"
- "Kila, Kike y Chocolate"
- "Los sitios acere"
- "La fonda de el bienvenido"
- "Mami me gustó"
- "Papa Upa"
- "El divorcio"
- "Anabacoa"
- "Adiós Roncona"
- "Dame un cachito pa' huelé"
- "Yo no como corazón de chivo"
- "Juégame limpio"
