= Stephen Ujlaki =

American documentary filmmaker and producer (born 1943)

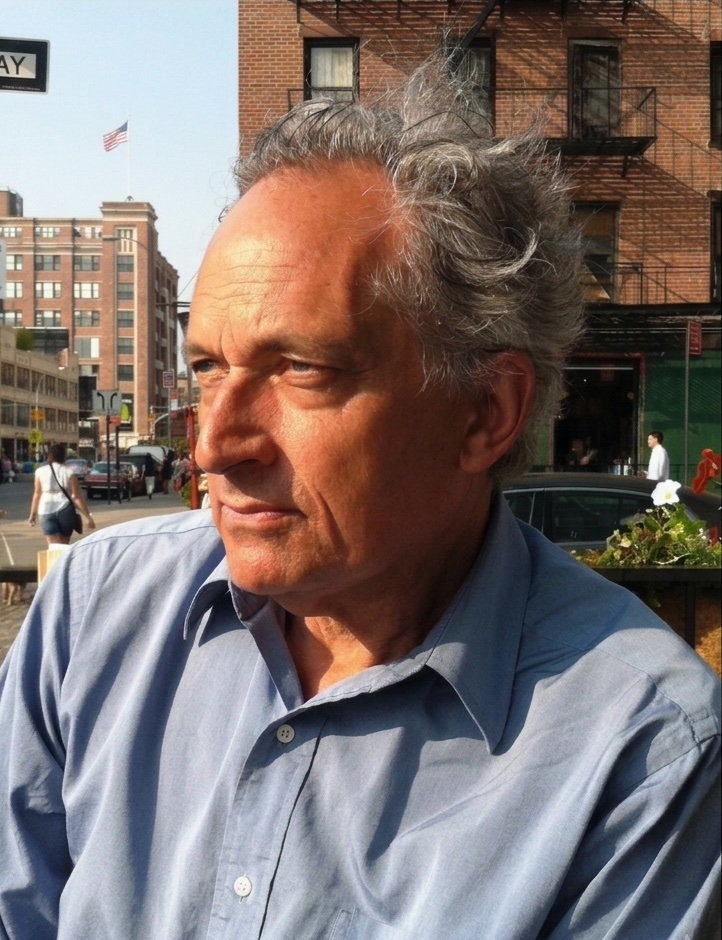
- Born: 16 June 1943 (age 83)
- Education: Harvard University; IDHEC
- Occupations: Documentary filmmaker; producer; professor
- Years active: 1968–present
- Spouses: Silvia Formenti (m. 1984; div. 2012); Jackie Clark Mancuso (m. 2014)

Stephen Ujlaki (born 16 June 1943) is an American documentary filmmaker, producer, and professor, known for the documentary Bad Faith (2024). He served as Dean of the Loyola Marymount University School of Film and Television from 2010 to 2018, and previously chaired the Cinema Department at San Francisco State University, where he founded the Doc Film Institute.

== Early life and education ==
Stephen George Bela Vladimir Ujlaki was born on 16 June 1943, in Washington, D.C., to Marina de Staël and György Újlaki. His mother, born Baroness Marina Vladimirovna Staël von Holstein (Russian: Марина Владимировна Шталь фон Гольштейн), and her two younger siblings, the future painter Nicolas de Staël and Olga, were exiled from St. Petersburg and soon orphaned following the Russian Revolution. His father György, a hyperpolyglot, emigrated from Budapest to the United States during the White Terror and later served in intelligence as a translator during World War II.

Ujlaki grew up in Rochester, New York, and graduated cum laude from Harvard University in 1965 with a Bachelor of Arts in French and English History and Literature. While at Harvard, he participated in Timothy Leary's LSD experiments on multiple occasions as part of the Harvard Psilocybin Project. He subsequently trained at the Institut des Hautes Études Cinématographiques (IDHEC) in Paris, the French national film school later reorganized as La Fémis.

== Early career ==
While studying at IDHEC, Ujlaki landed an informal internship with director Jean-Luc Godard. He produced Wheel of Ashes (1968), a feature directed by Peter Emanuel Goldman and starring Pierre Clémenti, which premiered in competition at the 29th Venice International Film Festival in 1968, and was later presented at the inaugural Quinzaine des Réalisateurs at the 1969 Cannes Film Festival. In the wake of the student uprisings of May 1968, Ujlaki was arrested and held at La Santé Prison before being deported from France. He relocated to Stockholm, where he attended rehearsals of Ingmar Bergman's production of Woyzeck. While working part-time as a dockworker, he directed Tunnelbana (1969), a 15-minute documentary about the Stockholm subway sponsored by the Swedish Film Institute.

Returning to the United States, Ujlaki taught film for one term at Brandeis University before being hired at the age of twenty-eight by president Leon Botstein to start the film program at the now-defunct Franconia College. During this period he made a series of documentaries on prison reform, anti-war activism, and the environment. These included Patriotism, Inc. (1971), an anti-Vietnam War film about patriotic indoctrination of youth through Revolutionary War reenactment, and Three Thousand Years and Life (1973), filmed inside Walpole State Prison during the prisoner takeover. Its companion film, With Intent to Harm (1973), shot inside four Massachusetts state prisons, was called "the best prison documentary ever made" by ABC News. With Hands and Hearts (1975), a dramatized history of the Kentucky Shakers narrated by Helen Hayes, was called "the best local historical documentary in some time" by the critic Howard Rosenberg. A Watersnake in Coney Valley (1974), a 15-minute animated satire on Nixon, his advisors, and the impeachment process, premiered in competition at the 10th Chicago International Film Festival in 1974, and was later distributed to universities and community libraries by Carousel Films. Ujlaki also organized a documentary film symposium at Brandeis that became the model for the later Doc Film Institute at SFSU.

== Hollywood career ==
Ujlaki began his Hollywood career as a writer before being hired as an executive at Mace Neufeld Productions in 1981. He later joined HBO, where he served as Vice President of Development and Production (1983–88). He subsequently became Head of European Feature and Television Production for The Stone Group (1988–1991), a production company founded by Michael Douglas.

He has produced more than thirty feature films, television films, and documentaries. His feature credits include Courage Mountain, The Hot Spot, Loch Ness, Ripley Under Ground, and The Cry of the Owl.

He is a member of the Academy of Motion Picture Arts and Sciences.

== Academic career ==
=== San Francisco State University (2001–2010) ===
Ujlaki joined San Francisco State University in 2001 as Chair of the Cinema Department. During his nine-year tenure, he founded the Doc Film Institute, which sponsors documentary film festivals and honors leading documentary filmmakers, with advisory board members including Martin Scorsese and Errol Morris. He also established a California State University-wide internship program for film students and launched a Visiting Fellows Program bringing industry professionals into the classroom.

=== Cachao: Uno Más (2008) ===
Ujlaki produced the Doc Film Institute's inaugural film, the bilingual documentary Cachao: Uno Más (2008), with actor Andy García and Tom Luddy. The film profiles Cuban musician Israel "Cachao" López and aired on PBS's American Masters series.

=== Loyola Marymount University (2010–present) ===
In 2010, Ujlaki was appointed Dean of the School of Film and Television (SFTV) at Loyola Marymount University. While dean, SFTV rose to rank among the top film schools in the United States, placing fifth on USA Today's list of America's top film schools and eighth in The Hollywood Reporter.

In 2013, he launched The Hollywood Masters, a student interview series produced in partnership with Stephen Galloway of The Hollywood Reporter, The student interviews were subsequently produced as a Netflix series. Guests have included Alfonso Cuarón, Clint Eastwood, Sean Penn, Helen Mirren, Amy Adams, Michael Caine, Pedro Almodóvar, Willem Dafoe, Jordan Peele, and Ava DuVernay.

He also organized international film series at SFTV, including Il Cinema Ritrovato on Tour, an annual festival of restored films from the Cineteca di Bologna, and Caméras d'Afrique: The Films of West Africa, a series of 21 West African films co-presented with Film Independent at LACMA and curated by Elvis Mitchell. Caméras d'Afrique was the first film festival in the United States dedicated solely to African films by African directors. As dean, he developed diversity initiatives through partnerships with Big Brothers Big Sisters of America and Ghetto Film School, for which LMU received the Big Brothers Big Sisters Innovator Award in 2016. He also established SFTV exchange programs in Bologna, with the University of Bologna, and in Budapest, with Eötvös Loránd University.

After stepping down as Dean of SFTV in 2018, he has continued at LMU as a Professor of Film.

=== Bad Faith (2024) ===
Ujlaki wrote, produced, and directed Bad Faith: Christian Nationalism's Unholy War on Democracy (2024). The film traces the history of the Christian nationalist movement in the United States from the Moral Majority through the 2021 United States Capitol attack and Project 2025. It premiered at the Palm Springs International Film Festival, where it was named an audience favorite. Documentary filmmaker Ken Burns called it a "powerful and timely film, filled with the dread this moment engenders; the cynical misuse of religion to advance aims diametrically the opposite of Christianity's mission," and Variety's Owen Gleiberman named it among the best films of 2024. In a review for The Christian Post, Jerry Newcombe cites film critic Ted Baehr's dismissal of the film as "propaganda [...] from the Religious Left," urging readers to avoid the film and arguing that America was founded as a Christian nation.

Ujlaki has continued to screen and promote the film through an ongoing national tour of university and community screenings.

== Personal life ==
Ujlaki has three children from his first marriage to Silvia Formenti. He lives in France with his second wife, artist Jackie Clark Mancuso.

== Selected filmography ==
Year	Title	Role
2024	Bad Faith	Director, Producer, Writer
2017	The Hollywood Masters	Executive Producer
2009	The Cry of the Owl	Executive Producer
2008	Cachao: Uno Más	Producer
2005	Ripley Under Ground	Producer
1996	Loch Ness	Producer
1990	The Hot Spot	Executive Producer
1989	Courage Mountain	Producer
1974	A Watersnake in Coney Valley	Director, Producer, Writer
1973	Three Thousand Years and Life	Director, Producer, Writer
1973	With Intent to Harm	Director, Producer, Writer
1971	Patriotism, Inc.	Director, Producer, Writer
1968	Wheel of Ashes	Producer

== Accolades ==
Year	Festival	Category	Work	Result
1968	Venice International Film Festival	Golden Lion	Wheel of Ashes	In competition
1974	Chicago International Film Festival	Gold Hugo	A Watersnake in Coney Valley	In competition
1996	Oulu International Children's Film Festival	Best Film	Loch Ness	Won
2024	Palm Springs International Film Festival	Best Documentary	Bad Faith	In competition
2024	Rhode Island International Film Festival	Best Documentary	Bad Faith	Won
2024	Washington, DC International Film Festival	Justice Matters Award	Bad Faith	Won
