= Branch Queens Prison rebellion =

1971 prisoner rebellion in New York

Branch Queens Uprising
- Part of 1970s Prison Rebellions
- Date: October 2nd, 1970 - October 6th, 1970
- Location: 25-10 Court Sq., Long Island City, New York; 40°44′44″N 73°56′34″W
- Caused by: inhumane living conditions, Severe prison overcrowding, poor sanitation, lengthy pre-trial detention, and low bail-review access
- Goals: Humane conditions, speedier trials, decreased bail amounts, religious freedom for Muslims, access to educational and political media
- Methods: seizure of jail facility, Press Conference, hostage-taking (five corrections officers), On-site bail hearings
- Result: Resolved through legal compromise; extraordinary on-site judicial bail hearings held

Parties
Inmate Governing Committee, Black Panther Party, Young Lords	New York City Department of Correction

Lead figures
Kuwasi Balagoon; Lumumba Shakur; Kwando Kinshasa; Victor Martinez	Mayor John Lindsay

The Branch Queens Prison Rebellion was an inmate-led rebellion that began on October 1, 1970 and took place at the Long Island City branch of the Queens House of Detention, known commonly as “Branch Queens". Driven by overcrowding, judicial delays, and political mobilization by groups like the Black Panther Party and the Young Lords, prisoners seized control of the facility and held five corrections officers hostage.

The rebellion occurred after the capture of Panther 21 and the Panthers that were held at the prison at the time included Kuwasi Balagoon, Lumumba Shakur, and Kwando Kinshasa.

The Branch Queens Rebellion began on October 1st, 1970 and was a precursor to the more well known Attica Prison riot that has been described as a historic event in the prisoners' rights movement.

Prisoners revolted to seek better living conditions and political rights. Law enforcement subjected many of the survivors to various forms of torture, including sexual violence.

== Background and Causes ==
Many of the prisoners participated in the riot because they desired better living conditions. Overcrowding contributed to the poor conditions as the facility held nearly double its intended capacity.

The political climate of the era heavily influenced the inmate population. Members of the Black Panther Party (BPP) and the Young Lords Party (YLP); many detained under high bails on politically charged indictments - organized the prisoners to demand systemic reforms.

Racist treatment by prison guards fueled prisoners' anger. Ongoing cultural movements of the time, such as the Black Power Movement and New Left, helped prisoners to understand and critique the conditions of their imprisonment.

During this period, there was a growing culture of activism in which prisoners not only demanded better treatment but sought to participate in broader movements for radical social transformation within and beyond the United States. Multiple rebellions occurred throughout the New York City Jail system, including the Manhattan House of Detention, the Brooklyn House of Detention, The Queens Branch House of Detention at Kew Gardens, and the Adolescent Remand Shelter on Rikers Island.

== Precursor events ==
- April 2, 1969: The NYPD executed coordinated predawn raids, capturing several members of New York’s BPP. Each of the Panther 21, as they came to be known, were held on $100,000 bail and indicted on a range of fabricated charges, including conspiring to assassinate police officers and bomb police stations, the subway system, department stores, and other public places
- August 10,1970: Manhattan House of Detention, commonly known at the time as the Tombs, prisoners captured five hostages and demanded an audience with the authorities
- August 17, 1970: 87/100 (Branch Queens) captives refuse to come to court hearings
- August 20, 1970: Eighty state agents stormed the Tombs and violently reasserted control. DOC Commissioner George F. McGrath then authorized a mass transfer in which two-thirds of the Tombs’ population, including Martinez, were transferred to Branch Queens.

== Timeline ==
- On October 1st, 1970: inmates overcame guards and took control of the facility, seizing five corrections officers as hostages. They then uncaged the entire population, including nine members of the Panther 21, who DOC had been holding in political quarantine in an isolated wing of the jail.
- October 2nd, 1970: Rebels hold a press conference. They released two hostages as a show of good faith and promised to release two more if New York State Supreme Court judges were brought to the jail to review their cases. If this did not happen, how- ever, the rebels announced their readiness to carry out executions.
- October 3rd, 1970: a three-judge panel held court on the grounds of a jail to review prisoner's cases. thirteen men, many of whom had been in jail for more than a year, were set free
- October 5th, 1970: Tombs rebels given one hour ultimatum and a faction release the hostages and surrender. The rebellion ends except for 39 holdouts who demanded their lawyers to be able to ensure their safety. The question of violence was put to a vote, resulting in the non-warriors winning by a margin of one. However, thirty-nine of the rebels, including the Panthers and Victor Martinez, refused to willingly enter into police custody where they knew they would be abused.
- October 6th, 1970: The holdouts allowed themselves to be lowered to the ground in groups of three in a fire department cherry picker, with their fists raised triumphantly. Lumumba Shakur was the last to exit the jail. As he descended, a crowd of over two hundred supporters cheered him on. He responded with a symbolic gesture of liberation. He raised his arm, revealed the keys to the jail, and tossed them into the crowd.

== Simultaneous and Related Prison Uprisings ==
Upon catching live news coverage of the Branch Queens rebellion, captives in the Tombs (Manhattan House of Detention) decided to expand the struggle to a second site.

Later that night, captives in another jail, the Queens House of Detention at Kew Gardens (QHD), rebelled as well; 900 rebels seized six of the jail’s eight floors.

The New York Times described the situation as “one of the most serious crises in the history of the city prisons. More than 1,400 inmates in three jails were in command of scores of cellblocks and were holding a total of 23 hostages— including three guard captains, 14 guards and six civilian employees.” And the crisis continued to deepen. On October 3, nearly 1,500 rebels in the Brooklyn House of Detention (BHD) seized three more hostages and gained control of seven out of the institution’s nine floors.

=== Queens House of Detention at Kew Gardens (QHD) Surrender ===
Upon cutting their way into the fourth floor of QHD, a guard captain reportedly announced, “The war is over . . . You have lost, this is now a concentration camp.”

A lawsuit filed on behalf of those who survived the QHD rebellion offers a glimpse of what recaptured rebels across the jail system endured.

Despite John Lindsey, the mayor of New York’s promise of no-reprisals, captives were stripped naked and made to stand at attention, only to be sprayed with fire extinguishers, shot at point-blank range with tear gas canisters, and savagely beaten with clubs, chains, and ax handles.

At the street level, in front of QHD’s lower C gate, spectators observed uniformed men dragging their captives out of the jail and collecting their beaten and bloodied bodies into a writhing pile, estimated by various witnesses to number between twenty-five and sixty people. Guards then jumped on the pile, kicking and clubbing the defenseless men in full view of the media. Offering a glimpse into the violent processes of psychological conditioning through which the killing of white authority figures becomes unfathomable, the guards forced the recaptured rebels to chant “Power to the Correction Officer,” “the Correction Officer is our God,” and other affirmations of their mastery and deification.

At least one captive, a Black man named Thomas “Shorty” Hines, was beaten to death, his lifeless body left lying in a cage for over twenty-four hours. At least fifty-nine QHD captives were hospitalized for serious injuries, including broken bones, lacerations, and skull fractures. In the weeks following the rebellion four captives, all of whom were Black/Puerto Rican men, were found hanged in New York City jail cages.

== Open Letter to Weatherman Underground ==
In an Open Letter written by Panthers that were participants the rebellion is referenced:

When we were in the Long Island City (Branch Queens) jail rebellion—we felt that the people outside could have supported us in the fullest revolutionary manner in two or three simultaneous ways.

1. Mass demonstrations at each of the prisons involved.
2. While the pigs—quite a large percentage— were surrounding the prisons—and if there had been mass demonstrations— while leaving the city vulnerable—in this case for five days—for some righteous urban guerrilla military actions, and
3. if the chance occurred—to liberate the prisoners at any jail that the opportunity presents itself.

Thus you see—the best tactics in revolution is in CONTINUOUS CONFRONTATION AND STRUGGLE

== Aftermath and related events ==
Incarcerated people and state authorities in Auburn Correctional Facility engaged in an ongoing conflict and confrontation between November 2, 1970, and June 9, 1971.

In July 1971, a group of Attica inmates presented a list of 27 demands regarding improvements in living conditions in Attica to state Commissioner of Corrections Russell Oswald and Governor Nelson Rockefeller. These demands included improvements in multiple areas such as diet, the quality of guards, rehabilitation programs, and, in particular, education programs. The inmates also demanded increased religious freedom, the ability to engage in political activity, and an end to censorship, which they argued were all vital to a proper education within the prison. The commissioner did not take any actions on the list of demands. Attica warden Vincent Mancusi responded by adding additional restrictions to inmates' reading materials and personal belongings.

In August 1971, George Jackson, an author and prominent member of the Black Panther Party, was shot and killed during an escape attempt in which three prison guards and two white inmates were murdered at San Quentin State Prison in California. Through his writings, Jackson had encouraged imprisoned people throughout the United States to become politically active. As a result, Jackson became one of the first targets of the FBI's Black Extremist Activities in Penal institutions program, which later evolved into the Prison Activists Surveillance Program (PRISACTS). Many incarcerated people in Attica had read Jackson's books and cited Jackson's death as a major catalyst for the riot. The day after Jackson's death, at least 700 Attica inmates participated in a hunger strike in his honor.

== See also ==
- List of notable prison riots – Organized act of defiance by prisoners against each other or the prison administration
- Prison Abolition – Movement to end incarceration
- Prisoner abuse in the United States
- Tip of the Spear – 2023 book by Orisanmi Burton
- Walpole prison strike – 1973 Boston-area prison officer strike and period of inmate self-governance
