= Bad faith (disambiguation) =

Bad faith is a sustained form of deception which consists of entertaining or pretending to entertain one set of feelings while acting as if influenced by another.

Bad faith may also refer to:

- Insurance bad faith, a legal term of art
- Bad faith (existentialism), a philosophical concept used by existentialist philosophers Jean-Paul Sartre and Simone de Beauvoir
- Bad Faith (film), a 2024 documentary film by Stephen Ujlaki and Chris Jones
- "Bad Faith" (Law & Order), a 1995 television episode
- "Bad Faith" (Suits), a 2013 television episode
- Bad Faith, a fictional rock band in the New Tricks TV series episode "Loyalties and Royalties"
- Bad Faith, a political podcast hosted by Briahna Joy Gray and Virgil Texas
- Bad Faith: Race and the Rise of the Religious Right, a 2021 book by Randall Balmer
