= Wheel of Ashes =

- Roue de cendres
- Directed by: Peter Emanuel Goldman
- Written by: Peter Emanuel Goldman
- Produced by: Peter Emanuel Goldman; Stephen Ujlaki
- Starring: Pierre Clémenti; Katinka Bo; Pierre Besançon
- Cinematography: Pierre-William Glenn; Peter Emanuel Goldman
- Edited by: Joële van Effenterre
- Music by: Hugh Robertson
- Production company: PBN Productions
- Release date: August 1968; (Venice)
- Running time: 110 minutes
- Countries: France; United States
- Language: French

Wheel of Ashes (Roue de cendres) is a 1968 drama film directed by Peter Emanuel Goldman and starring Pierre Clémenti.

== Plot ==
A young man named Pierre decides to abandon his chaotic life and turn toward spirituality. He follows a young Danish woman and begins to be tormented by visions.

== Production ==
Wheel of Ashes was Goldman's second feature, following Echoes of Silence (1965), and was shot in black-and-white 16 mm on the Left Bank of Paris over roughly six weeks in 1968, in the period leading up to the May 1968 events. Pierre Clémenti made the film between his collaborations with Luis Buñuel and Pier Paolo Pasolini. Goldman financed the production on a shoestring budget that included a pledge of support from Jean-Luc Godard. Members of the Living Theatre company, among them Judith Malina, appear in the cast.

== Cast ==
- Pierre Clémenti as Pierre
- Katinka Bo as Anka
- Pierre Besançon as David
- Richard Leblanc as the voice of Pierre's spirit
- Juliet Berto as the first girl playing pinball
- Ted Joans as the jazz poet
- Judith Malina as the mad preacher woman
- David Medalla as the sculptor
- Stasia Gelber as the second girl playing pinball
- Sean Flynn as the man standing in the corner

== Release ==
Wheel of Ashes was presented in the official competition at the 25th Venice International Film Festival in 1968. It was also screened at the first Directors' Fortnight during the 1969 Cannes Film Festival. It was released in France on 24 February 1971.

== Reception ==
Cahiers du Cinéma wrote of the film, "There was not one of us who was not profoundly touched by this film… perhaps the first to give a true feeling of certain quarters of Paris." The American filmmaker and critic Jonas Mekas praised Goldman's characters as coming "to life simply and believably", finding the film "a thematic and formal beauty that is remarkable." At the film's French release in 1971, Jean-Louis Bory, writing in Le Nouvel Observateur, praised Clémenti's performance, saying he "is not acting: he's living his part."
