= Three Thousand Years and Life =

- Directed by: Stephen Ujlaki
- Written by: Stephen Ujlaki
- Produced by: Stephen Ujlaki
- Narrated by: Randall Conrad
- Edited by: Randall Conrad
- Release date: 1973
- Running time: 42 minutes
- Country: United States
- Language: English

Three Thousand Years and Life (also styled 3000 Years and Life) is a 1973 American documentary short film written, produced and directed by Stephen Ujlaki. Filmed inside Walpole state prison (MCI–Walpole) during the 1973 prisoner takeover, the film examines the misuse of authority in correctional institutions in New England and gives inmates a platform to describe abuse by guards and administrators.

== Background ==
The film documents events at MCI–Walpole, which at the time was Massachusetts's highest-security prison and was known as among the most violent in the country, with regular stabbings and murders and severe psychological stress for inmates and prison officers alike. In the fall of 1972, inmates organized a democratically elected labor union, the Walpole chapter of the National Prisoners Reform Association (NPRA). After a prolonged dispute between the prison officers' union and Corrections Commissioner John O. Boone, the officers staged a mass walkout in March 1973. Rather than send in the state police, Boone turned over the internal running of the prison to the NPRA, aided by a skeleton crew of officers and trainees and by citizen observers.

Between 15 March and 19 May 1973, the NPRA was the central force governing daily life inside Walpole. Prisoners ran the prison's security, policy, kitchen and foundry, and handled new-inmate intake through elected committees. There were no murders and violence was minimal, and civilian observers logged some 10,000 hours documenting the prisoners' self-governance. Instead of the chaos and violence officials had expected, the three months marked what has been described as the most peaceful, nonviolent and productive period in the prison's history. The episode is now viewed as central to the American prison abolition movement. The takeover ended when state police retook the institution in May 1973.

== Synopsis ==
Shot from the inmates' perspective, the film depicts what an autonomous, self-governing prison might look like. Scenes of prisoners quietly painting and stamping out license plates for pennies an hour are set against interviews in which inmates make little effort to mask their anger at prison staff and describe systemic abuse, corruption, and the failures of the rehabilitation model. The film concentrates on the disturbances at Walpole that resulted in the officers' strike and in what one contemporary reviewer called "a remarkably successful act of self-government by the prisoners."

== Production ==
Ujlaki had obtained permission to film inside Walpole for a companion documentary, With Intent to Harm (1973), which also included scenes inside the Norfolk, Concord and Framingham state prisons. The crew was shooting at Walpole when the guards walked out in March 1973, which allowed the takeover to be documented from inside as it unfolded. Once filming wrapped, Ujlaki left for Kentucky to make another documentary, giving the footage and his Steenbeck flatbed to his former Harvard classmate Randall Conrad, who edited and narrated the film.

== Reception ==
Reviewing the film and its companion With Intent to Harm (1973) for The Boston Globe, correspondent Richard Burgin called them "very direct and fast-moving polemic films" meant "to inform, to anger, to be moving, [and] to resonate."

== Legacy ==
The film was among the works surveyed in Dan Georgakas's 1974 essay "Prison Films" in Cinéaste, where it was characterized as documenting the Walpole takeover as an experiment in self-governance. It has since been cited as one of the earliest documentaries on prison abolition and continues to be screened in university programs on incarceration and used as a primary source in scholarship on the takeover.

On October 30, 2018, Northeastern University's Snell Library screened the film as part of its "Neighborhood Matters" series.

In March 2023, a two-day symposium at Harvard University on the 50th anniversary of the takeover opened with a screening of the film, followed by a discussion with former Walpole inmates Bobby Dellelo, the inaugural president of the NPRA, who appears in the film as a prisoner spokesman and leader, and Albert Brown.

== See also ==
- Prison abolition movement
- Attica Prison riot
