= Attica (1974 film) =

- British Poster
- Directed by: Cinda Firestone
- Written by: Cinda Firestone
- Produced by: Cinda Firestone
- Edited by: Tucker Ashworth; Cinda Firestone
- Distributed by: Attica Films, Inc.
- Release date: 1974
- Running time: 80 minutes
- Country: United States
- Language: English
- Budget: $40,000

Attica is a 1974 American documentary film directed by Cinda Firestone. The documentary focuses on the 1971 Attica uprising. The film cost $40,000 to make, being put together using footage of the event and shoots from inside the prison. It received positive reviews and was later selected for preservation in the United States National Film Registry in 2022.

== Synopsis ==
The film covers the Attica Prison riot in 1971, using news footage and interviews from prisoners of Attica. It also features footage of the McKay Commission, which investigated the leadup to the riot.

== Production ==
Attica was directed by Cinda Firestone, heiress to the Firestone Tire and Rubber Company. While writing a piece about the prison uprising for the Liberation News Service, Firestone came up with the idea of making a film about it. The initial concept was doing a 5–10 minute film combining taped interviews from Attica prisoners with still photographs. She eventually obtained footage of the event from television stations and UPI. She and a film crew would later shoot inside the prison itself. The Firestone family funded the film, putting up $40,000 to make it. The film premiered at the International Filmfestival Mannheim-Heidelberg in October 1973.

== Reception and legacy ==
Gloria Woman from the Lesbian Tide called Attica "a very powerful document". Vincent Canby for The New York Times described the film as "an exceptionally moving, outraged recollection of that terrible event." In 2022, the film was selected for preservation in the United States National Film Registry by the Library of Congress as being "culturally, historically, or aesthetically significant".

== Bibliography ==
- Smith, Sharon (1975). Women Who Make Movies. Hopkinson & Blake. ISBN 0-911974-09-1.
