= With Intent to Harm =

1973 American documentary film

- Directed by: Stephen Ujlaki
- Written by: Stephen Ujlaki
- Produced by: Stephen Ujlaki
- Release date: 1973
- Running time: 28 minutes
- Country: United States
- Language: English

With Intent to Harm is a 1973 American documentary short directed by Stephen Ujlaki, filmed inside four Massachusetts state prisons. A companion piece to Ujlaki's Three Thousand Years and Life (1973), it documents prison conditions and the prisoners' rights movement that followed the 1971 Attica uprising.

== Synopsis ==
Shot inside the Norfolk, Framingham, Walpole and Concord state prisons in Massachusetts, the film depicts life behind bars and the emerging prisoners' rights movement, describing the plight of inmates deprived of most human and civil rights.

== Reception ==
Reviewing it alongside Three Thousand Years and Life in The Boston Globe, Richard Burgin described the two works as "very direct and fast-moving polemic films" meant "to inform, to anger, to be moving, [and] to resonate." ABC News called it "the best prison documentary ever made." The film circulated nationally through churches, universities and community groups, and was presented at a documentary symposium at the University of Maine.

== See also ==
- Attica Prison riot
- Prison abolition movement
- Three Thousand Years and Life
