= Ismael López =

Ismael López may refer to:

- Ismael López (footballer, born 1978), Spanish football attacking midfielder
- Isma López (born 1990), Spanish football left-back

== See also ==
- Israel López (disambiguation)
