= Samuel L. Perry =

American sociologist

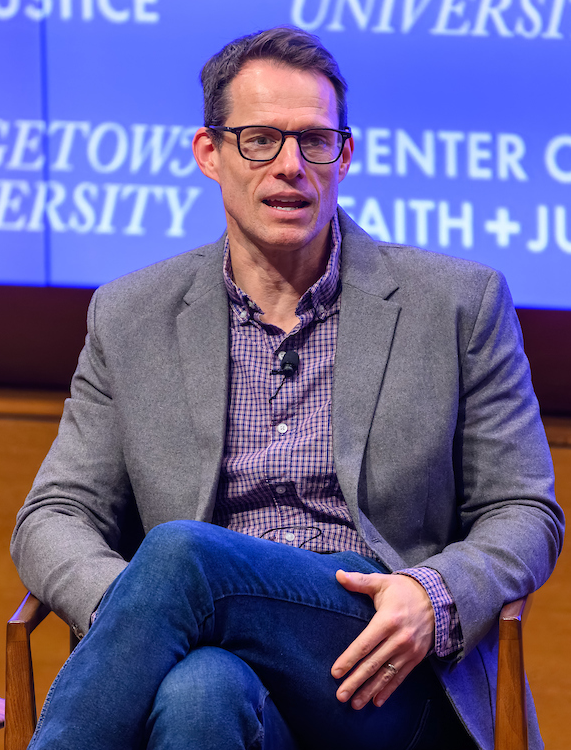

Academic background
- Education: Augusta University (BA) Dallas Theological Seminary (ThM) University of Chicago (MA, PhD)

Academic work
- Discipline: Sociologist
- Sub-discipline: Political Science, Psychology, Religious Studies, Sexual Behavior
- Institutions: University of Oklahoma
- Doctoral students: Joshua Davis, Elizabeth McElroy, Darci Schmidgall

Samuel L. Perry is an American sociologist known for his research on American Christianity, politics, and sexual behavior. He is currently the Sam K. Viersen Presidential Professor of Sociology at the University of Oklahoma. Perry is an affiliated scholar at the Public Religion Research Institute, and for the 2026-2027 academic year he will be a Visiting Scholar at the Russell Sage Foundation in New York City. The topics of his books and articles have included American evangelicals and their social engagement, Christian nationalism, moral incongruence and religious responses to pornography use, religion and interracial marriage, Christian adoption and foster care, pronatalism, and English Bible translations.

Perry's work has been recognized with awards from the Society for the Scientific Study of Religion, the Association for the Sociology of Religion, Society for the Scientific Study of Sexuality, and Christianity Today. Since 2022, the scholarly analytics firm ScholarGPS has rated Perry as the number-one ranked sociologist in the world according to their metrics of scholarly productivity and impact.

Perry has written for outlets like TIME Magazine, The Washington Post, NBC News, and The Dallas Morning News. His interviews and research findings have also been featured on CNN, C-Span, The Mehdi Hasan Show, and recent documentaries by Frontline and Al Jazeera. Perry is also one of the featured experts interviewed in the film Bad Faith: Christian Nationalism's Unholy War on Democracy.

== Early life and education ==
Perry was born in Richardson, Texas. His parents had one other biological son and adopted two African American daughters. Perry's father and mother are evangelical Christians. He has attributed his initial interest in the sociology of religion and race to growing up in an interracial evangelical family.

Perry earned a B.A. degree in communications from Augusta University in 2003, where he also minored in sociology. He later received a Th.M. degree in New Testament from Dallas Theological Seminary, where he received the W. H. Griffith Thomas Award for graduating at the top of his class. He received an M.A. in the Masters of Arts Programs in the Social Sciences at the University of Chicago in 2010. He would later return to the University of Chicago to receive his Ph.D. in sociology in 2015. Perry wrote his doctoral dissertation on the evangelical orphan care movement, which was the subject of his first book.

== Career ==
Perry became an assistant professor in the Department of Sociology at the University of Oklahoma in 2015, where he is currently on faculty. He was promoted to associate professor with tenure in 2020, promoted to Full Professor in 2023, and named the Sam K. Viersen Presidential Professor in 2024. He has received awards for teaching and research at OU, including the Irene Rothbaum Outstanding Assistant Professor Award, the Outstanding Research Impact Award, the Award for Excellence in Social Science Research, and the Award for Excellence in Research and Creative Activity.

== Research ==
Perry is primarily a sociologist of American religion with special interests in religion's relationship to American politics, culture, race, sexual behavior, and families.

The contributions for which Perry is most well known include developing the concept of moral incongruence to describe psychological responses to moral and religious violations, the concept of Christian nationalism, and the ways culture wars shape English Bible translations, focusing primarily on the English Standard Version.

== Books ==
- Perry, Samuel L. (2017). Growing God’s Family: The Global Orphan Care Movement and the Limits of Evangelical Activism. New York: NYU Press. ISBN 978-1479803057
- Perry, Samuel L. (2019). Addicted to Lust: Pornography in the Lives of Conservative Protestants. New York: Oxford University Press. ISBN 978-0190844219
- Whitehead, Andrew L., and Samuel L. Perry. (2020). Taking America Back for God: Christian Nationalism in the United States. New York: Oxford University Press. ISBN 978-0190057886
- Gorski, Philip S., and Samuel L. Perry (2022). The Flag and the Cross: White Christian Nationalism and the Threat to American Democracy. New York: Oxford University Press. ISBN 978-0197618684
- Perry, Samuel L. (2024). Religion for Realists: Why We All Need the Scientific Study of Religion. New York: Oxford University Press. ISBN 978-0197672556
