= Bad Faith (film) =

2024 film by Stephen Ujlaki and Chris Jones

- Film poster
- Directed by: Stephen Ujlaki; Chris Jones
- Written by: Alec Baer; Chris Jones; Stephen Ujlaki
- Produced by: Stephen Ujlaki
- Starring: Elizabeth Neumann; Ken Peters; Eboo Patel; Steve Schmidt; Katherine Stewart; Samuel Perry; Russell Moore; Rev. William Barber II; Linda Gordon; Jim Wallis; Lisa Sharon Harper; Jonathan Wilson-Hartgrove; Anne Nelson; Brent Allpress; John Marty; Stan Minner
- Narrated by: Peter Coyote
- Cinematography: Pilar Timpane; Billy Yates
- Edited by: Alec Baer; Chris Jones
- Music by: Jeremy Grody; Lili Haydn
- Production companies: Heretical Reason Productions; Panarea Productions
- Distributed by: Film Sales Company
- Release date: January 10, 2024
- Running time: 89 minutes
- Country: United States
- Language: English

Bad Faith: Christian Nationalism's Unholy War on Democracy is a 2024 American documentary film directed by Stephen Ujlaki and co-directed by Chris Jones. The film examines the rise of Christian nationalism in the United States, its opposition to American democracy, and the historic role of Christian nationalists in the conservative movement. It begins with Paul Weyrich and Jerry Falwell in the Moral Majority and Weyrich's creation of the secretive Council for National Policy. These figures opposed secular and democratic institutions and supported using government to promote Christianity. Their political influence later contributed to the candidacy of Donald Trump, the subsequent January 6 United States Capitol attack, and the policy blueprints for Project 2025.

Ujlaki conceived the film after Trump won the 2016 election, which prompted him to reconsider his assumptions and to research the reasons supporters had voted for Trump. The documentary draws on a number of books about Christian nationalism, most notably works by journalist Anne Nelson and historian of religion Randall Balmer. The film was shot in 25 locations across the United States and Australia during the COVID-19 pandemic, and took several years to edit and complete. Reviews were largely positive; critics praised the film's educational value and its central thesis about the dangers of weakening the separation of church and state.

== Background ==
Director Stephen Ujlaki is a professor of screenwriting and former dean of the School of Film and Television at Loyola Marymount University, a private Jesuit and Marymount research university in Los Angeles, California. The idea for the documentary came to him after Donald Trump won the 2016 United States presidential election and he found himself in a state of disbelief.

Ujlaki realized that he was caught in a filter bubble, so he set out to learn as much as he could about the people who voted for Trump, focusing on the evangelical community, reading many books on the subject, and conducting interviews with key players. The documentary eventually emerged from his own personal research.

Major aspects of the film are based on the book Shadow Network: Media, Money, and the Secret Hub of the Radical Right (2019) by journalist Anne Nelson. The title of the film is adapted from the book Bad Faith (2021) by historian of religion Randall Balmer.

== Synopsis ==
Brown v. Board of Education (1954) desegregated public schools, but it was opposed in the Southern United States, particularly by some Christian religious groups who continued to practice segregation in religious schools well into the 1970s. Conventional wisdom suggests that concern about abortion led to the creation of the politically motivated religious right in America in the 1970s, but many historians and journalists believe this is a myth.

Instead, Green v. Connally (1971) may have been the true catalyst for the formation of the religious right as a political force, as the court in that case ruled that organizations operating racially discriminatory private schools were ineligible for tax-exempt status. When Roe v. Wade (1973) was decided, most non-Catholic evangelicals did not oppose abortion. It did not become a significant issue for them until the late 1970s and early 1980s, years after the ruling, and at first drew little public opposition in the Christian community.

The film suggests that Paul Weyrich, a Republican political operative and Christian nationalist, galvanized the religious pro-segregationists and redirected their anger toward the federal government. According to the film, the aim was to create a Trojan horse, a new voting bloc to help the Republican Party (GOP) win elections, with the intention of subverting democracy and promoting theocracy under the guise of concern about abortion. Toward this end, Weyrich and Jerry Falwell founded the Moral Majority and helped form a new political network, leading to the election of Ronald Reagan. Weyrich also built a coalition with oil billionaires, who were not necessarily religious but who wanted the shared benefits of lower taxes and less regulation, thereby helping to fund the Heritage Foundation, the American Legislative Exchange Council, and the secretive Council for National Policy.

Combined, these groups waged a long-term culture war against the United States, culminating in the weakening of democratic norms and institutions, the election of Donald Trump, the undermining of democratic elections with the January 6 United States Capitol attack, and the policy blueprints for Project 2025, which would fulfill Weyrich's 40-year goals as expressed in his original manifesto: "Our strategy will be to bleed this culture dry...Make no mistake about it: We are talking about Christianizing America...We will weaken and destroy the existing institutions."

== Production ==
Filming began during the COVID-19 pandemic in the United States, with shooting taking place in 25 locations across the country (as well as in Australia) with the help of local contractors. Location shooting included: Los Angeles, California; Norman, Oklahoma; Minneapolis, Minnesota; New York, New York; Lenoir City and Nashville, Tennessee; Santa Fe, New Mexico; Park City, Utah; Boston, Massachusetts; Chicago, Illinois; Amarillo, Texas; Washington, D.C.; Durham, North Carolina; and Melbourne, Australia.

The team spent several years editing the footage. Franklin Graham refused to allow the crews access, while Ken Peters of Patriot Church in Tennessee was more than happy to let them film. Ujlaki recalls: "I think that Pastor Ken...felt that all publicity is good publicity. He was very proud of what he was doing. He was absolutely confident that he was getting the word out. He was using us; I think that was his feeling. And he was always being very solicitous to make sure that we got what we needed."

== Interviewees ==
People interviewed in the film include national security expert Elizabeth Neumann, formerly with the Trump administration; preacher Ken Peters, founder of Patriot Church; Eboo Patel, founder of Interfaith America; former Republican campaign strategist Steve Schmidt; investigative journalist Katherine Stewart; sociologist Samuel L. Perry; theologian Russell D. Moore, Editor-in-Chief of Christianity Today; minister William Barber II, co-founder of the Poor People's Campaign: A National Call for a Moral Revival; historian Linda Gordon, professor at New York University; theologian Jim Wallis, founder of Sojourners; Christian writer Lisa Sharon Harper; Christian writer Jonathan Wilson-Hartgrove; investigative journalist Anne Nelson; investigative journalist Brent Allpress; and Minnesota State Senator John Marty.

== Release ==
The film held its premiere at the Palm Springs International Film Festival on January 11, 2024, along with a Q&A panel. The film was also shown at New York's Cinema Village. The theatrical release took place in Los Angeles on March 29, and it began streaming on April 26.

== Reception ==
On the review aggregator website Rotten Tomatoes, 100% of eight critics' reviews are positive, with an average rating of 8.2/10.

Owen Gleiberman of Variety reviewed the film positively, calling it one of the "scariest" films he had seen in recent years and writing that it made a "powerful case" that Christian nationalism rests on false premises. Gleiberman argued that the First Amendment's freedom of religion was intended as a safeguard against religious tyranny, and that Christian nationalism undermines both the freedoms enshrined in the Constitution and the concept of free will central to Christian theology.

Writing for The Humanist, David Reinbold gave the film a positive review, calling it "simultaneously informative, sobering, chilling, frightening, but always with vestiges of hope". Reinbold noted that the filmmakers set out both to educate the audience and to persuade them to register to vote.

Jared Stacy of Premier Christianity also reviewed the film positively, noting that it effectively shows how democracy in the United States is threatened by "moral hypocrisy and political idolatry within the evangelical faith". Stacy writes that at times the film is "sensational and conspiratorial", but concludes that "it does provide a glimpse of how the evangelical faith justifies the corrupting pursuit of political power".

Jerry Newcombe of The Christian Post reviewed the film negatively, defending Christian nationalism as a legitimate philosophy while citing Christian film critic Ted Baehr, who dismissies the film as a "propaganda" effort by the "Religious Left".

== Accolades ==
Year	Festival	Award	Result
2024	Palm Springs International Film Festival	Best Documentary	In competition
2024	Rhode Island International Film Festival	Best Documentary	Won
2024	Washington, DC International Film Festival	Justice Matters Award	Won

== See also ==
- God & Country
