= Cachao: Uno Más =

- Directed by: Dikayl Rimmasch
- Produced by: Andy García; Tom Luddy; Stephen Ujlaki
- Starring: Israel "Cachao" López; Andy García; Gloria Estefan; Emilio Estefan; John Santos; Ray Santos
- Narrated by: Andy García
- Music by: Israel "Cachao" López
- Production companies: Doc Film Institute; THIRTEEN / WNET; Latino Public Broadcasting
- Distributed by: PBS (American Masters)
- Release date: April 2008; (SFIFF)
- Running time: 83 minutes
- Country: United States
- Languages: English, Spanish

Cachao: Uno Más is a 2008 American documentary film celebrating the Cuban bassist and composer Israel "Cachao" López, one of the co-creators of the mambo and a master of the descarga (Cuban jam session). The film is built around a sold-out 2005 concert Cachao gave at Bimbo's 365 Club in San Francisco. It premiered in April 2008 at the San Francisco International Film Festival, and later aired nationally on the PBS series American Masters on September 20, 2010.

== Synopsis ==
The film traces Cachao's life from his beginnings as a child prodigy in Havana, through his classical training and 30-year tenure in the Havana Philharmonic, to the double life he led at night playing Havana's clubs and dance halls with his brother Orestes. Together the brothers transformed the stately Cuban danzón into the danzón-mambo in the late 1930s, and in the 1950s pioneered the improvised descargas cubanas that helped lay the groundwork for Latin jazz and salsa.

The documentary follows Cachao into exile after the Cuban Revolution, his years playing with leading Latin bands in New York, a difficult period in Las Vegas marked by a gambling habit, and his slide into obscurity in Miami, where he played for tips. It closes on the career revival sparked by Andy García in the 1990s, a collaboration that produced a series of Grammy-winning albums and restored Cachao's standing as one of the most important figures in Afro-Cuban music.

== Background ==
Andy García first approached Cachao in 1989 about making a tribute concert and film, a partnership that culminated in his first documentary, Cachao... como su ritmo no hay dos (1993), and in the Grammy-winning Master Sessions albums. Cachao: Uno Más extended that decades-long collaboration, with García describing Cachao as belonging in the company of Louis Armstrong, Dizzy Gillespie, Charles Mingus, and Charlie Parker.

== Production ==
The spine of the film is a 2005 concert at Bimbo's 365 Club, a historic San Francisco nightclub. The performance was shot with eight cameras, warm lighting, and studio-quality sound recording and mixing. Interwoven throughout are scenes of Cachao reminiscing about his life over lunch with García and saxophonist Ray Santos, as well as interviews with his daughter María Elena, his driver, and fellow musicians including percussionist and historian John Santos and Gloria and Emilio Estefan. Among the film's noted moments is García joining Cachao on percussion.

The documentary was produced by San Francisco State University's Doc Film Institute and shot primarily in San Francisco. It was made in association with THIRTEEN for American Masters and Latino Public Broadcasting for PBS. Series creator Susan Lacy served as executive producer of American Masters.

== Release ==
Cachao: Uno Más premiered in April 2008 at the San Francisco International Film Festival, a few weeks after Cachao died in Coral Gables, Florida, on March 22, 2008. The premiere was followed by a tribute concert with the John Santos Band at Yoshi's jazz club in San Francisco. It subsequently screened at film festivals in the United States, Spain, Mexico, Brazil and Colombia, and received its national television premiere as an episode of the PBS series American Masters on September 20, 2010, presented as a bilingual (English and Spanish) production.

== Reception ==
Reviewing the American Masters broadcast for All About Jazz, Eugene Holley Jr. described it as a "lovingly-produced" film that "splendidly updates an out-of-print documentary from the early 1990s," praising the archival footage of early 20th-century Havana and the concert clips from Bimbo's 365 Club.

== See also ==
- Cachao
- Mambo (music)
- Descarga
