= Cinda Firestone =

American movie director

Cinda Firestone Fox (born July 28, 1948) is an American film director. She is best known for her 1974 film Attica about the 1971 Attica Prison riot, which she made when she was 23 years old.

== Films ==
- Attica
- South Beach
- Retirement
- Mountain People
