= Courage Mountain =

- Theatrical release poster
- Directed by: Christopher Leitch
- Written by: Fred Brogger; Mark Brogger; Weaver Webb
- Produced by: Stephen Ujlaki
- Starring: Charlie Sheen; Leslie Caron; Yorgo Voyagis; Jan Rubeš; Juliette Caton
- Cinematography: Jacques Steyn
- Edited by: Martin Walsh
- Music by: Sylvester Levay
- Production companies: Epic Productions; Stone Group Pictures
- Distributed by: Triumph Films
- Release date: February 16, 1990 (United States)
- Running time: 99 minutes
- Countries: France; United States
- Language: English
- Box office: $1.4 million (US)

Courage Mountain (also known as Courage Mountain: Heidi's New Adventure) is a 1990 adventure drama film and serves as a sequel to Johanna Spyri's 1881 novel Heidi. It was directed by Christopher Leitch and stars Charlie Sheen, Leslie Caron, Juliette Caton and Jan Rubeš. The film is set during the outbreak of World War I with Heidi as a teenager, despite the fact that the original novel (in which Heidi is 5) was first published in 1881.

== Plot ==
In 1915, during World War I, Heidi, now fifteen years old, still lives on the Swiss Alps with her grandfather. She receives an invitation from Madame Jane Hillary, the headmistress of Brookings School for Girls in Italy, to join her school. Heidi has the means to go, as she has just received an inheritance from her friend Klara's grandmother. Grandfather wants Heidi to make the most of the opportunity so she will be able to take care of herself when he is gone. Though initially reluctant, when she learns that her sweetheart Peter has joined the army, she accepts the invitation. Heidi is at first unable to adapt to modern life at the school, often clashing with her more sophisticated classmate Ursula. Heidi's only friend is Ilsa who often stands up for Heidi whenever she is bullied by Ursula and her snobby cohorts, though she has the kind support of Madame Hillary who like her originally came from a more modest background.

Italy enters World War I and the Italian troops arrive at the school with a letter from the Governor and commandeer the building for use as a military post. All the girls are fetched by their families except for four: Heidi, Ursula, Ilsa and her sister Gudrun. Hillary is happy to care for the four girls, but the unscrupulous owner of the town orphanage, Signor Bonelli, claims the girls. Hillary is forced to give them up as Bonelli has the support of the Governor. The four girls find that the orphanage is a run-down and cruel place that uses forced labor. Heidi wants to escape, but Ursula insists that Madame Hillary will come for them. Hillary's attempt is blocked by Bonelli. Heidi eventually learns through another orphan, Clarissa that they can escape through the drain. The four Brookings girls, Clarissa, and another orphan named Giovanni escape and hitch a ride on a cart for the countryside.

Signor Bonelli chases after them and catches Giovanni. The five girls escape through the forest and head for the mountains to cross over into Switzerland, briefly crossing paths with soldiers who are traveling on horseback. Hillary learns of the girls' sighting through the soldiers and, knowing that Heidi would lead the girls to her grandfather, decides to go to the Alps herself. Grandfather learns of the girls' crossing through Peter, and asks him to find them and bring them safely across.

The girls go through the mountains and are found by Peter, who has brought them food. He leaves them the next morning to get a sled and, while he is gone, Signor Bonelli catches up with them. To protect his secrets, he intends to fake an accident in which all the girls fall off the mountain. Heidi calls Peter, who arrives in time to save them; Signor Bonelli struggles with Peter and falls off the mountain to his death. The group cross the mountains, Heidi is reunited with Grandfather, and the Brookings girls are reunited with Hillary. Grandfather, Hillary, Peter and all the girls share a Christmas dinner. Clarissa is to be adopted by Grandfather, Signor Bonelli's orphanage is closed, but the war is still on. Peter declares he has to leave, but he promises to return to Heidi.

== Cast ==
- Juliette Caton as Heidi
- Joanna Clarke as Ursula
- Nicola Stapleton as Ilsa
- Jade Magri as Clarissa
- Kathryn Ludlow as Gudrun
- Charlie Sheen as Peter
- Jan Rubeš as Grandfather
- Leslie Caron as Jane Hillary
- Yorgo Voyagis as Signor Bonelli
- Laura Betti as Signora Bonelli

== Release ==
=== Box office ===
Courage Mountain was released on February 16, 1990, and grossed $1.4 million in the US.

=== Critical reception ===
Janet Maslin of The New York Times called it "a scenic, decorous, studiedly innocent throwback". Kevin Thomas of the Los Angeles Times wrote that the film is uneven but has stunning cinematography. TV Guide rated it 1/4 stars and criticized the film for its "sloppy", "mediocre" script and the casting of Sheen.

On Siskel & Ebert, film critics Gene Siskel and Roger Ebert named it one of the worst films of 1990. Ebert remarked: "I think I would do almost anything to avoid sitting through Courage Mountain again".

== Home media ==
RCA/Columbia released it on VHS in July 1990. The rights have since passed on to Metro-Goldwyn-Mayer via its purchase of the pre-1996 PolyGram library, which contained the Epic film catalog.
