= Tip of the Spear =

2023 book by Orisanmi Burton

Tip of the Spear: Black Radicalism, Prison Repression, and the Long Attica Revolt
- Author: Orisanmi Burton
- Publisher: University of California Press
- Publication date: October 31, 2023
- ISBN: 9780520396326

Tip of the Spear: Black Radicalism, Prison Repression, and the Long Attica Revolt is a non-fiction book by anthropologist Orisanmi Burton. It draws on oral histories collected from politically active prisoners and combines that with a wide array of rarely analyzed archival documents, offering a radical re-narration of the Attica Prison Rebellion. Whereas dominant accounts of the rebellion geographically confine the event to a single prison (Attica Correctional Facility) and delimit its time frame to five days between September 9 and 13, 1971, Burton argues that what he calls "the Long Attica Revolt," was a protracted struggle that included, "multiple rebellions, both large and small, some preceding the September rebellion in Attica, others emerging in its wake, some confined to a single prison, others dispersed across multiple carceral sites: city jails, state prisons, mental institutions, urban streets, foreign territories, and so on."

Tip of the Spear was published by the University of California Press on October 31, 2023.

== Synopsis ==
The introduction lays out the primary argument of the book, outlines the author's theoretical framework, and discusses his methodological approach. Burton argues that the United States prison system is best understood as a domain of hidden warfare against a Black radical movement for liberation, a movement that evolved from anti-slavery resistance. He makes this argument by drawing on an extensive array of archival documents - those produced and preserved by the state, as well as those produced and preserved by politically active prisoners who were targeted for "neutralization" via programs such as COINTELPRO and PRISACTS. Burton combines these archival sources with oral histories conducted with participants in this movement, eschewing abstract notions of objectivity to produce an account grounded in the perspectives of Black radical prisoners: "It is this relation of accountability to the intellectuals and combatants of this undeclared war, both living and dead, and to the ancestral traditions that nurtured them, that distinguishes this book from previous treatments of Attica and from the growing body of academic scholarship on Black radicalism within and beyond prisons." He describes his methodology of reading official state archives alongside and against archival sources produced and archived by Black rebels as "archival war."

Entitled "The Long Attica Revolt," Part I is divided into three chapters, which take readers through Burton's extended account of the rebellion.

1. "Sharpening the Spear: Strategies and Tactics of Revolutionary Action," covers a series of coordinated rebellions that erupted in various New York City jails between August and October, 1970. In doing so, it explores how imprisoned people organized themselves to resist prison repression and how they negotiated the role of violence in their struggle.

2. "Black Solidarity Under Siege: Three Terrains of Protracted Rebellion," focuses on the Auburn Prison rebellion, which according to Burton lasted from November 1970 to July 1971. It explores how imprisoned rebels wrote letters to combat state propaganda, resisted physical assault via "counter-violence," and strove to evolve on a psychological, affective, and spiritual level.

3. "Attica Is: Revolutionary Consciousness and Abolitionist Worldmaking," re-tells the story of the Attica rebellion, which Burton calls "a story that we only think we know." Forgoing the dominant focus on prisoner's demands for institutional reform, Burton offers what he calls "the most ambitious effort to date to elaborate Attica's abolitionist and revolutionary content." Drawing on the writings of George Jackson, Burton argues that the Attica was an expression of guerrilla warfare inside the prison, he compares the rebellion to the Paris Commune, makes a case for the rebellion's progressive gender politics, and discusses its Third World internationalism.

Part II is entitled "Prison Pacification" and discusses the United States government's response to the Long Attica Revolt, including what Burton calls "sadistically inventive forms of physical violence, isolation, psychological and psychiatric assault, sexual terror, propaganda, liberal reformism, and white supremacist science and technology."

4. "Gender War: Sexual Revenge and White Masculine Repair," describes the intense forms of sexual violence, rape, and torture, that prisoners were forced to endure in retaliation for their participation in the Long Attica Revolt. Burton compares this violence to lynching, sexual violence during chattel slavery, and the US torture scandal in Abu-Graib.

5. "Hidden War: Four Strategies of Reformist Counterinsurgency," offers a critical reading of the reforms implemented in the wake of the rebellion. These reforms include improving prison conditions, creating new rehabilitation programs, and inviting prison-based volunteers into the prison system. Whereas most accounts of the post-Attica reforms see these changes as positive developments, Burton analyzes them as part of a conscious and coherent counterinsurgency project designed to fracture and debilitate the radical social movement that had developed within prisons. He highlights how key figures involved in these reforms such as Nelson Rockefeller (New York's Governor at the time) had institutional links to counterinsurgency operations conducted abroad.

6. "The War on Black Revolutionary Minds: Failed Experiments in Scientific Subjugation," focuses on the use of psychological and psychiatric methods to destroy the consciousness of Black radical prisoners. Burton connects these efforts to secret and largely illegal government programs such as the Federal Bureau of Investigation's COINTELPRO and PRISACTS, as well as the Central Intelligence Agency's Project MK Ultra.

== Reception ==
Tip of the Spear has received critical acclaim from outlets such as The Nation, The Progressive, Verso, Against the Current, Propaganda in Focus, Counterpunch, Inquest, The Los Angeles Review of Books, Public Books, Medical Anthropology Quarterly, Crime Media Culture, Ethnic Studies Review, N+1, Anthropology Quarterly, Race & Justice, Sociology of Race & Ethnicity, Michigan Law Review, Crime, Law, and Social Change, and Current Anthropology, which noted: "Burton's book gives readers a new conceptual language, a new framework, and a new orientation for any future research on Black radical consciousness, carcerality, and abolition. It will change the fields of critical carceral studies and counterinsurgency and will give new direction to the anthropology of Black masculinity and prisons as sites of warfare."

The book was shortlisted for the 2024 Museum of African American History Stone Book Award. It was also a finalist for the 25th Susanne M. Glasscock Book Prize awarded by the Melbern G. Glasscock Center for Humanities Research at Texas A & M University, and received an Emerging Scholar Honorable Mention from the Delmos Jones and Jagna Sharff Memorial Book Prize awarded by the Society for the Anthropology of North America. The non-profit Innocence Project selected Tip of the Spear as one of its "11 Best Books of 2023."

Tip of the Spear has been censored, banned and labelled contraband in prisons across the country on the basis that it poses a threat to prison security. In a review for Race & Justice, Brian Pittman wrote: "There is no way to write a review that does this book justice. Its impact is far-reaching, as recognized by the state of New York which banned the book from its facilities." In response to the ban, Burton published "An Open Letter to Prison Officials on the Censorship of Tip of the Spear" with the online publication Black Agenda Report. He wrote, "The real issue is not that my book may incite riots, but that your hold on power is so fragile, so tenuous, so devoid of legitimacy that mere words on a page may be enough to make your cages of concrete and steel go up in flames." An Updated version of the open letter was later republished by Public Books.
