= Loch Ness (film) =

1996 British film by John Henderson

- DVD cover art
- Directed by: John Henderson
- Written by: John Fusco
- Produced by: Tim Bevan; Eric Fellner; Stephen Ujlaki
- Starring: Ted Danson; Joely Richardson; Ian Holm; James Frain
- Cinematography: Clive Tickner
- Edited by: Jon Gregory
- Music by: Trevor Jones
- Production companies: Gramercy Pictures; Working Title Films
- Distributed by: PolyGram Filmed Entertainment
- Release dates: 9 February 1996 (United Kingdom); 20 September 1996 (United States)
- Running time: 101 minutes
- Country: United Kingdom
- Language: English
- Budget: $7 million
- Box office: $10 million

Loch Ness is a 1996 British family drama film starring Ted Danson and Joely Richardson. It was written by John Fusco and directed by John Henderson.

== Plot ==
At Loch Ness, Scotland, scientist Dr. Abernathy is killed by slipping off some rocks, after seeing something in the loch and taking a single photograph of it. Months later, American zoologist and freshman college tutor, Dr. John Dempsey, is asked to replace Abernathy and dispel the myth of the Loch Ness Monster. Dempsey is reluctant to do so, having ruined his career by trying to prove the existence of the Sasquatch. He agrees to go for the money, which would allow him to pay off an IRS debt & pay alimony to his ex-wife that ran off, partly for him naming a newly discovered species of parasitic wasp after her.

Arriving in Scotland, Dempsey meets Dr. Abernathy's assistant Adrian Foote, who fanatically believes in the monster. Dempsey rents a room at a local inn run by Laura McFetridge and her young daughter, Isabel, who grows close to him. He soon meets the other locals, fisherman Andy McLean, who aggressively comes to see Dempsey as a rival for Laura's affections; eccentric Gordon Shoals, who claims the monster is his property; and the Water Bailiff, who is highly protective of the legend, and tries to repeatedly sabotage Dempsey's efforts.

Using state-of-the-art technology, Dempsey scans the whole loch, and is unable to find any trace of the monster. When he declares the end of the myth, Adrian angrily berates him, but Dempsey admits he wants to find the dinosaur to rebuild his career, left cynical by his failure to find the Sasquatch. Dempsey later receives Dr. Abernathy's camera, discovering the photo he took on the night he died—revealing it shows a dinosaur's flipper. He and Adrian venture out to search the loch again. After tracking a 40-foot-long object, it collides with and sinks the boat. Dempsey and the Water Bailiff nearly drown, but are rescued by an unseen creature. A thrilled Dempsey claims to have seen the monster.

Andy assaults Dempsey for his relationship with Laura, but she defends him. Isabel gives him a get-well card, with a drawing of what she calls a "water kelpie" on it. Realising she, too, has seen the monster, Dempsey convinces Isabel to show him where it lives, and he will buy her a red bicycle she has always wanted. Isabel leads him to a cavern beneath Urquhart Castle, where they encounter a family of plesiosaur and elasmosaur hybrids. Isabel can communicate with them through a series of whistles. In astonished euphoria, Dempsey takes photographs of the monsters, frightening them, and knocking Isabel into the water. He saves her, but is confronted by the Water Bailiff.

Dempsey is kicked out of the inn by a furious Laura, and Isabel is deeply hurt by his betrayal. Dempsey and Adrian travel to London to publicly reveal the animals' existence. Dempsey meets the Water Bailiff on the train, imploring him to not reveal the truth. Dempsey reasons that exposure and science would help the creatures, but the Water Bailiff points out how it was Isabel and her faith, not science, that led him to the animals.

At a conference at the Natural History Museum, Dempsey is unable to go through with the presentation, replacing his photographs with Isabel's kelpie drawing. On the way out, Dempsey informs Adrian that he fabricated his photographs before coming to Scotland, but Adrian, knowing the truth, understands. The Water Bailiff returns to Loch Ness, discovering Dempsey slipped his photographs into his bag during their conversation on the train. Dempsey returns to the inn, reuniting with Laura and Isabel, bringing the new bicycle with him. The plesiosaurs swim through the loch, accompanied by an infant.

== Cast ==
- Ted Danson as Dr. Jonathan Dempsey
- Joely Richardson as Laura McFetridge
- Kirsty Graham as Isabel McFetridge
- Ian Holm as Water Bailiff
- Harris Yulin as Dr. Robert Mercer
- James Frain as Adrian Foote
- Keith Allen as Gordon Shoals
- Nick Brimble as Andy McLean
- Phillip O'Brien as Dr. Abernathy
- Edward Hibbert as Scientist (Cameo)
- Ted Green as Bus Driver

== Production notes ==
Screenwriter John Fusco wrote the screenplay when he was 23 years old as a tribute to his Scottish grandmother Isabel Moffat. In the film, the young girl's name is Isabel and she resides at the Moffat Arms Inn.

=== Locations ===
Although partly shot around Loch Ness in Scotland, the external hotel and village scenes, where most of the story takes place, were filmed at Lower Diabaig on the west coast of Highland. The internal scenes of the conference room and hotel lobby area, and external shots of the hotel were shot at John Nike OBE DL's Coppid Beech Hotel in Binfield, Bracknell, Berkshire, England.

=== Soundtrack ===
The film score by Trevor Jones was released on Perseverance Records on 9 September 2005. Originally, Rod Stewart's 1991 song "Rhythm of My Heart" was used during the closing credits of the film; however, that is not the version heard on this CD. According to Jones in the CD's liner notes: "Rhythm of My Heart" is performed here by an artist who could not be identified and not Rod Stewart as in the film. The version on the CD is a cover of the song by the Scottish band Runrig that first appeared on their 1996 compilation album Long Distance.

== Reception ==
=== Box office ===
The film opened on 9 February 1996 on 179 screens in the United Kingdom and grossed £567,274 for the weekend finishing fourth at the UK box office. It went on to gross £2.6 million in the United Kingdom and $10 million worldwide.

=== Critical response ===
Derek Elley of Variety magazine praised Joely Richardson for her excellent performance and said the film was elevated by the majestic score from Trevor Jones. David Nusair of Reel Film Reviews rated it 2.5 out of 4 and called it "...entertaining enough, though entirely forgettable..." and although "Danson delivers an unexpectedly complex performance" ... "there's a reason this premiered on television".

=== Accolades ===
Starboy Award, 1996, Oulu International Children's Film Festival.

== See also ==
- List of films featuring dinosaurs
- Magic in the Water (1995)
- Mee-Shee: The Water Giant (2005)
- The Water Horse: Legend of the Deep (2007)
