= Documentary Film Institute =

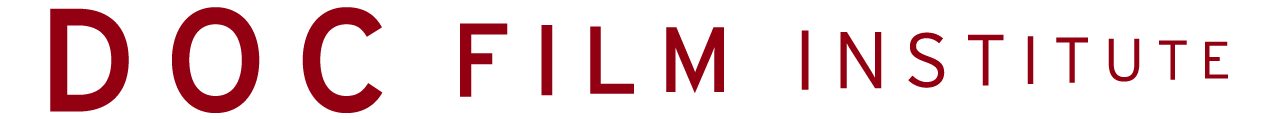
- Type: Nonprofit
- Established: 2005
- Founder: Stephen Ujlaki
- Affiliations: San Francisco State University
- Director: Soumyaa Kapil Behrens
- Location: 1600 Holloway Ave. #FA 234, San Francisco, California, United States
- Website: http://docfilm.sfsu.edu

The Documentary Film Institute (also known as the Doc Film Institute or DocFilm), is an independent organization within San Francisco State University (SFSU) that is dedicated to support non-fiction cinema by promoting documentary films and filmmakers and producing films on socially and culturally important topics which deserve wider recognition. It is situated within the College of Liberal & Creative Arts at San Francisco State University, with access to a broad cross-section of educational institutions in San Francisco and the Bay Area. It is a resource for undergraduate and graduate students studying film in the area as well as faculty interested in the artistic and politic dimensions of documentary cinema.

== History ==
The institute was founded in 2005 by SFSU Cinema Department Chair Stephen Ujlaki. Tom Luddy, co-founder of the Telluride Film Festival, served as its creative curator.

In its early years DocFilm organized thematic festivals, premieres, tributes and film exhibitions that brought national and international filmmakers to Bay Area audiences, and gave the west coast premieres of acclaimed documentaries such as Darwin's Nightmare and Grizzly Man. In 2006 it launched Oscar Docs (2006–09, 2011), an annual three-day festival of the Academy Award-nominated short and feature documentaries, featuring introductions and Q&As by many of the nominated filmmakers. That same year it mounted "Leacock/Pennebaker: Pioneers of Cinema Vérité", a tribute to Direct Cinema filmmakers Richard Leacock and D. A. Pennebaker, held March 2–5, 2006 at the de Young Museum's Koret Auditorium and the Castro Theatre, with both filmmakers appearing in person.

Ujlaki left SFSU in 2010 to become Dean of the School of Film and Television at Loyola Marymount University. In 2011, film critic Bill Nichols became chair of the advisory committee. The current director is Soumyaa Kapil Behrens, a professor in the Cinema Department at SFSU.

== Productions ==
DocFilm produces films which provide a deeper introspection of a wide range of socio-cultural topics. Institute staff work with professional filmmakers, some of whom are Cinema Department faculty at San Francisco State University. Students benefit from working as interns on these films. Its productions include the following films:

=== Cachao: Uno Más (2008) ===
DocFilm's inaugural production, Cachao: Uno Más, is a tribute to the Afro-Cuban musician Israel "Cachao" López. It was produced by Ujlaki together with Andy García and Tom Luddy, and made by professional filmmakers working alongside Cinema Department students. The film premiered at the 2008 San Francisco International Film Festival, screened at festivals worldwide, and was broadcast in 2010 in the PBS series American Masters.

=== Chang Dai-chien in California (2013) ===
This 23-minute film pays tribute to the 20th-century Chinese master painter Chang Dai-chien, who was filmed by the art historian Michael Sullivan in 1967. San Francisco State University acquired the footage from Sullivan and used it to create the documentary, which had its public American premiere in 2013.

=== Abina and the Important Men (2017) ===
An animated feature adaptation of Trevor Getz and Liz Clarke's graphic novel Abina and the Important Men, directed by Soumyaa Kapil Behrens. Based on court transcripts from the 1870s Gold Coast, it tells the story of Abina Mansah, a young West African woman who took her former master to court for enslaving her. The cast was drawn from San Francisco State University students, faculty and staff.

=== Con Moto: The Alexander String Quartet (2017) ===
A short documentary following the Alexander String Quartet on a performance tour of Poland, exploring the tradition of chamber music and the quartet's collective voice. It was broadcast on KQED's series Truly CA.

=== Love Boat: Taiwan (2019) ===
DocFilm supported Love Boat: Taiwan, a feature-length documentary directed by San Francisco State University professor Valerie Soe about the Taiwanese government-sponsored summer study program popularly known as the "Love Boat". The film premiered at the Los Angeles Asian Pacific Film Festival in May 2019.

=== The Dawn Is Too Far (2024) ===
Previously titled We Are Here, this 60-minute documentary portrays four generations of Iranian Americans in the San Francisco Bay Area through interviews with 25 members of the community. It was co-directed by Behrens and Persis Karim and produced in collaboration with San Francisco State University's Center for Iranian Diaspora Studies.

== Education ==
DocFilm offers master classes, production internships, seminars and mentoring to students and audiences at large.

Renowned filmmakers including Francis Ford Coppola, Ken Burns, Bertrand Tavernier, D.A. Pennebaker, Richard Leacock, Jean-Pierre Jeunet, Christopher Hampton and Hubert Sauper have presented master classes for San Francisco State University students, sharing their experiences and creative process. The institute also runs an internship program placing students with professional filmmakers and in event coordination.
