= Randall Balmer =

American historian of religion

The Reverend Randall Balmer
- Born: Randall Herbert Balmer; October 22, 1954 (age 71); Chicago, Illinois, US

Academic background
- Education: Trinity Evangelical Divinity School; Princeton University; Union Theological Seminary
- Thesis: Dutch Religion in an English World (1985)

Academic work
- Discipline: History
- Sub-discipline: American religious history; ecclesiastical history
- Institutions: Columbia University; Dartmouth College

Ecclesiastical career
- Religion: Christianity (Anglican)
- Church: Episcopal Church (United States)
- Ordained: 2006 (deacon); 2006 (priest)

Randall Herbert Balmer (born October 22, 1954) is an American historian of American religion.

== Biography ==
Balmer taught at Barnard College and Columbia University for twenty-seven years before moving to Dartmouth College in 2012, where he was named the Mandel Family Professor in the Arts & Sciences. He is also an Episcopal priest. He earned his PhD from Princeton University in 1985. He has been a visiting professor at Dartmouth College and at Rutgers, Princeton, Drew University, Emory University, Yale and Northwestern universities and at Union Theological Seminary, where he was also adjunct professor of church history. He has also taught in the Columbia University Graduate School of Journalism. He was visiting professor at Yale Divinity School from 2004 until 2008.

Following his ordination in 2006 and concurrent with his academic responsibilities, Balmer served as part-time rector of two Episcopal parishes in Connecticut: St. John's Episcopal Church in Washington (2008–2009) and Christ Episcopal Church in Middle Haddam (2010–2012). In addition to his academic writing, Balmer has published commentaries in newspapers across the country, including The Des Moines Register, The Philadelphia Inquirer, The Dallas Morning News, the Omaha World-Herald, the Los Angeles Times, the Anchorage Daily News, the Hartford Courant, the St. Louis Post-Dispatch, New York Newsday, the Minneapolis Star Tribune, and The New York Times, among others. His work has also appeared in The Nation, The New Republic, The Washington Post Book World, and The New York Times Book Review. Balmer is a pescetarian.

Balmer was nominated for an Emmy for scriptwriting and hosting the three-part PBS documentary Mine Eyes Have Seen the Glory, based on his book with the same title. He also wrote and hosted two other PBS documentaries: Crusade: The Life of Billy Graham and In the Beginning: The Creationist Controversy.

== Criticism of the religious right ==
In various books and articles, Balmer has criticized the politicization of the American Christian evangelical movement. In an article titled "Jesus is not a Republican" in the Chronicle of Higher Education, Balmer writes:

Indeed, the most effective and vigorous religious movements in American history have identified with the downtrodden and have positioned themselves on the fringes of society rather than at the centers of power. The Methodists of the 19th century come to mind, as do the Mormons. In the 20th century, Pentecostalism, which initially appealed to the lower classes and made room for women and people of color, became perhaps the most significant religious movement of the century.

The leaders of the religious right have led their sheep astray from the gospel of Jesus Christ to the false gospel of neoconservative ideology and into the maw of the Republican Party. And yet my regard for the flock and my respect for their integrity is undiminished. Ultimately it is they who must reclaim the gospel and rescue us from the distortions of the religious right.

The Bible I read tells of freedom for captives and deliverance from oppression. It teaches that those who refuse to act with justice or who neglect the plight of those less fortunate have some explaining to do. But the Bible is also about good news. It promises redemption and forgiveness, a chance to start anew and, with divine help, to get it right. My evangelical theology assures me that no one, not even Karl Rove or James Dobson, lies beyond the reach of redemption, and that even a people led astray can find their way home.

The title of Balmer's book about the religious right, Bad Faith: Race and the Rise of the Religious Right (2021), was used for the documentary film of the same name.

== Political career ==
In 2003, Balmer ran for a seat on his local school board and lost by four votes.

In 2004, Balmer won the Democratic nomination for a seat representing the 111th District in the Connecticut House of Representatives. Balmer ran in the general election against incumbent Republican John H. Frey, despite the fact that Balmer had lived in the district for less than three years, Frey had never drawn an opponent, and the town of Ridgefield (which the 111th District represents) was "two-to-one Republican." Ultimately, Balmer was defeated in the election. Frey won 8,824 votes, and Balmer won 4,478 votes; Frey won more votes than anyone else in the Connecticut House that year.

== Selected publications ==
- Grant Us Courage: Travels Along the Mainline of American Protestantism. New York: Oxford University Press. 1996. ISBN 0-19-510086-7.
- (1999) Blessed Assurance: A History of Evangelicalism in America. Boston: Beacon Press. ISBN 0-8070-7711-9
- (2002) Protestantism in America. New York: Columbia University Press. ISBN 0-231-11130-4
- Encyclopedia of Evangelicalism, 2nd Edition, Waco, Texas: Baylor University Press, 2004, ISBN 1-932792-04-X
- (2006) Mine Eyes Have Seen the Glory: A Journey into the Evangelical Subculture in America. 4th ed. New York: Oxford University Press. ISBN 0-19-530046-7
- (2006) Thy Kingdom Come: How the Religious Right Distorts the Faith and Threatens America: An Evangelical's Lament. New York: Basic Books. ISBN 0-465-00519-5
- (2008) God in the White House: How Faith Shaped the Presidency from John F. Kennedy to George W. Bush. San Francisco: HarperOne. ISBN 0-06-073405-1
- (2010) The Making of Evangelicalism: From revivalism to politics and beyond. Waco, TX: Baylor University Press. Pp vii + 89. [Paperback edition 2017.]
- (2014) Redeemer: The Life of Jimmy Carter. New York: Basic Books. ISBN 978-0465029587
- Co-authored with; Riess, Jana (2015). Mormonism and American Politics. Columbia University Press. ISBN 9780231540896.
- (2016) Evangelicalism in America. Waco, TX: Baylor University Press. 211 pages. [Paperback edition 2018.]
- (2021) Bad Faith: Race and the Rise of the Religious Right. Grand Rapids, MI: Eerdmans. ISBN 978-0-8028-7934-9
- (2025) America’s Best Idea: The Separation of Church and State. Lebanon, NH: Steerforth Press. ISBN 978-1-5864-2414-5

== Documentaries and e-seminars ==
- "Crusade: The Life of Billy Graham"
- "Crucible of Pluralism: Religion in Modern America"
- "Mine Eyes Have Seen The Glory"
