= PRISACTS =

Covert FBI operation to stop prison rebellions

PRISACTS (a syllabic abbreviation derived from Prison Activists Surveillance Program) was a covert project of the United States Federal Bureau of Investigation (FBI) aimed at surveilling, infiltrating, discrediting, and disrupting political activity within the United States prison system.

== History ==
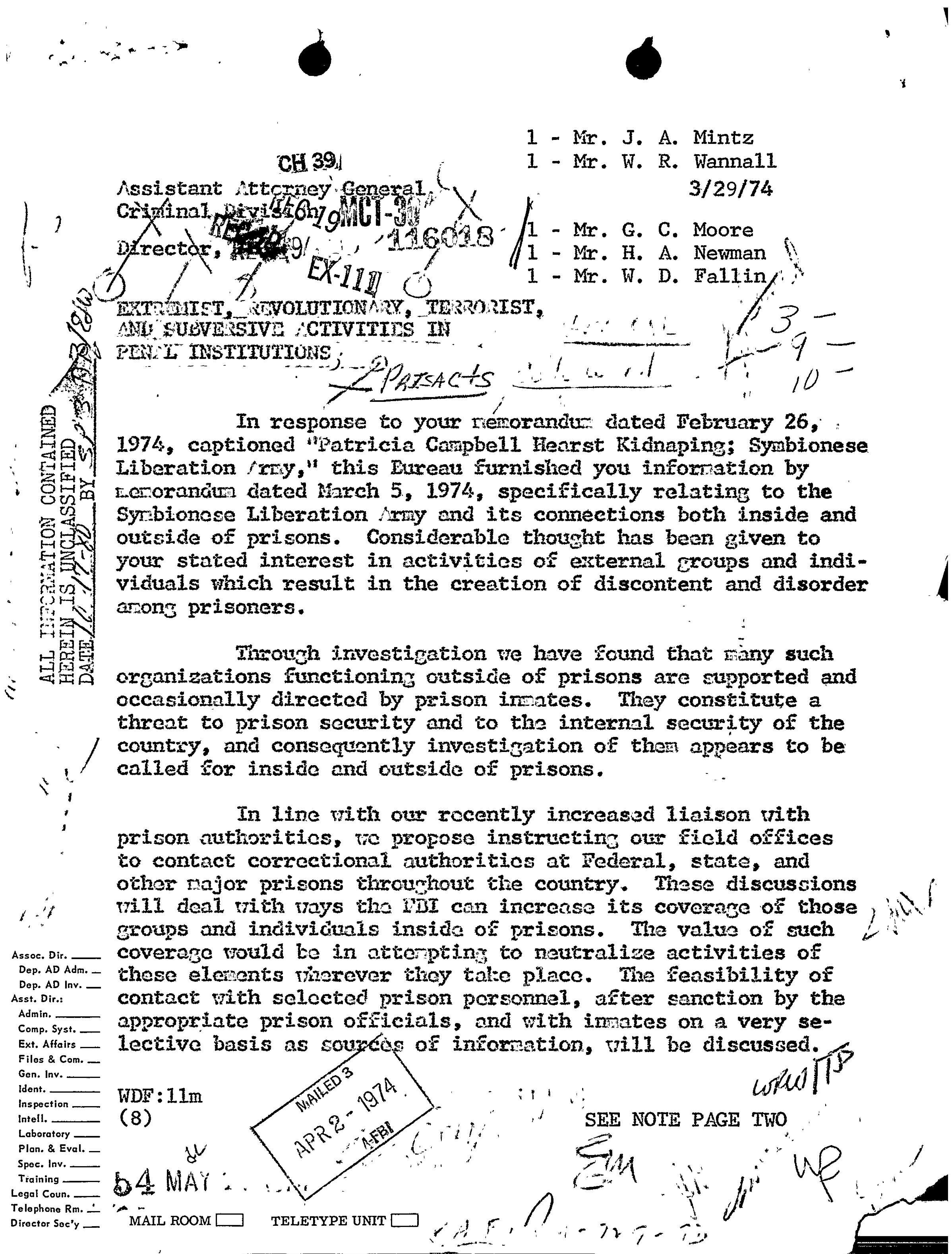
The first page of an FBI memo outlining the genesis and purpose of PRISACTS

Although PRISACTS was officially launched in 1974, it belonged to a continuity of FBI programs focused on monitoring and eliminating political activities deemed subversive, especially those that embraced leftist political objectives such as economic redistribution, an end to war, racial justice, and gender equality.

PRISACTS was an outgrowth of the FBI's Counter Intelligence Program, code named COINTELPRO, a series of covert and illegal projects conducted between 1956 and 1971. Through COINTELPRO, the FBI targeted activists and organizations perceived as subversive through psychological warfare; smearing individuals and groups using forged documents and by planting false reports in the media; harassment; wrongful imprisonment; illegal violence; and assassination. In the wake of COINTELPRO's official cancellation in 1971, a report by the Senate Church Committee noted, "COINTELPRO existed for years on an 'ad hoc' basis before the formal programs were instituted, and more significantly, COINTELPRO-type activities may continue today under the rubric of 'investigation.'" PRISACTS was one such COINTELPRO-type activity that targeted imprisoned activists. According to Dhoruba bin-Wahad, a Black Panther Party member who was targeted by COINTELPRO and PRISACTS, the program "was designed to monitor political activists who were brought to prison as a consequence of the Counterintelligence Program."

An FBI program captioned "Black Extremist Activity in Penal Institutions" was the immediate precursor to PRISACTS and was developed when many of the individuals and organizations imprisoned as a result of COINTELPRO continued to organize and agitate while incarcerated in local, state and federal prisons. In an August 21, 1970 memo, FBI Director J. Edgar Hoover wrote: "Increasing activity of black extremists in penal institutions throughout United States makes it necessary we obtain information concerning their activities in order to fulfill out responsibilities in racial intelligence field. Recruiting activities of black extremist groups, establishment of such groups within penal institutions, plans made for violent action by these groups and overall racial picture within penal institutions are of definite interest to Bureau and many other agencies." Months later, in a March 9, 1971 memo, Hoover elaborated: “There is no question that a definite link is being established between the extremely dangerous black extremist organizations such as the BPP [Black Panther Party] and black extremist groups operating within the penal system in this country. Likewise, there is no doubt regarding the fact that the black extremists in our penal institutions are increasingly responsible for fomenting discord within the penal system including extortion, blackmail, rioting and the holding of hostages in furtherance of their revolutionary aims."

The Black Extremist Activity in Penal Institutions program and PRISACTS were first exposed by Dhoruba bin-Wahad, and his legal team, which included attorneys Elizabeth Fink, Robert Bloom, and Robert J. Boyle. In 1974, bin-Wahad and his attorneys initiated a lawsuit against various agencies within the United States government asserting that his conviction for the attempted murder of two New York City Police Department officers was the result of a government conspiracy to imprison him and destroy the Black Panther Party. Following a protracted lawsuit, the team managed to prove that with the aid of COINTELPRO agents, the prosecuting attorney in bin-Wahad's case, knowingly withheld exculpatory evidence from the defense. This resulted in a reversal of bin-Wahad's conviction and his release from prison in 1990. It also resulted in the release of more than 300,000 pages of previously classified government documents related to COINTELPRO, PRISACTS, and other classified programs.

The Black Extremist Activity in Penal Institutions program became PRISACTS on May 10, 1974. It was also referred to via the caption: "Extremist, Revolutionary, Terrorist and Subversive Activities in Penal Institutions." The program was overseen by FBI agent William D. Fallin.

The program built on an investigation, conducted by the House Internal Security Committee (HISC) entitled "Revolutionary Activities Directed Toward the Administration of Penal or Correctional Systems" and a subsequent HISC report entitled Revolutionary Target: The American Prison System. Following the investigation, the report, and the program's launch, the FBI convened “The National Symposium on the American Penal System as a Revolutionary Target." During the symposium, prison administrators from all over the country were joined by representatives from the Law Enforcement Assistance Administration, the National Institutes of Health and other federal agencies. They gathered at the FBI Training Academy in Quantico, Virginia between June 19–21, 1974, and discussed propaganda and revolutionary warfare strategy and tactics as it related to subversive activism in prisons.

== PRISACTS Targets ==
In addition to bin-Wahad, individuals targeted under the "Black Extremist Activity in Penal Institutions" caption include other BPP members, including Geronimo Pratt, whose imprisonment was also the result of COINTELPRO, George Jackson, who was killed in prison one year to the day after the Black Extremist Activity in Penal Institutions caption was introduced, and Jalil Muntaqim. The FBI also used this caption in connection with its surveillance of the Black Liberation Army, the Black Guerilla Family, the Symbionese Liberation Army, and the Attica Prison Riot, as well as subsequent efforts to prevent the Attica prisoners who organized and participated in the riot from engaging in further political activities.

== Program Termination and Legacy ==
PRISACTS was officially terminated on August 16, 1976. According to bin-Wahad, "The government has said that this [PRISACTS] was terminated in 1976 but we have information that indicates it was continued under a different name up until the 1980s." Anthropologist Orisanmi Burton has indicated that PRISACTS never ended, but was instead absorbed by local, state, and federal prison systems.
