= Silvia Formenti =

Italian-American physician, oncologist

Silvia C. Formenti
- Education: University of Milan; University of Southern California
- Scientific career
- Workplaces: Weill Cornell Medicine; NYU Langone Health; Los Angeles General Medical Center

Silvia Chiara Formenti is an Italian-American oncologist who is Chair of the Department of Radiation Oncology at Weill Cornell. She is associate director of the Meyer Cancer Center. She investigates the role of ionizing radiation on the immune system. She was elected to the National Academy of Medicine in 2024.

== Early life and education ==
Formenti is from Milan. She completed her medical training at the University of Milan. She moved to the University of Southern California for specialty training, where she focused on cancer immunology.

== Research and career ==
Formenti works in radiation biology. She has studied the role of ionizing radiation on the immune system, and shown how tumors respond better to a combination of radiotherapy and immune therapy. She has designed clinical trials for metastatic breast cancer, lung cancer and melanoma. She showed that in the presence of an immune checkpoint blockade (e.g. CTLA-4) an irradiated metastatic tumor can become an immunogenic hub, and behave similar to a vaccine. When immunized against the metastatic tumor, the host develops an immune response that can reject other tumors. She has shown that localized radiation and immune checkpoint blockades can help patients enter remission. Her research has shown that it is possible to convert "immunogenically cold" (i.e. non-responsive) tumor into an "immunogenically hot" (i.e. responsive) tumor.

Formenti showed that radiotherapy modifies how breast cancer cells process biomolecules, activating signalling pathways that are activated in other viruses. She has developed new strategies to reduce the risk of cardiovascular toxicity during breast cancer radiotherapy. Her strategy prevents radiation fields damaging the lungs or heart.

Formenti joined Weill Cornell Medicine in 2015. In 2024, Formenti was elected to the National Academy of Medicine.

== Selected publications ==
- Marie Vétizou; Jonathan M Pitt; Romain Daillère; et al. (5 November 2015). "Anticancer immunotherapy by CTLA-4 blockade relies on the gut microbiota". Science. 350 (6264): 1079–1084. doi:10.1126/SCIENCE.AAD1329. ISSN 0036-8075. PMC 4721659. PMID 26541610.
- M Zahidunnabi Dewan; Ashley E Galloway; Noriko Kawashima; J Keith Dewyngaert; James S Babb; Silvia C Formenti; Sandra Demaria (25 August 2009). "Fractionated but not single-dose radiotherapy induces an immune-mediated abscopal effect when combined with anti-CTLA-4 antibody". Clinical Cancer Research. 15 (17): 5379–5388. doi:10.1158/1078-0432.CCR-09-0265. ISSN 1078-0432. PMC 2746048. PMID 19706802.
- Claire Vanpouille-Box; Amandine Alard; Molykutty J Aryankalayil; et al. (9 June 2017). "DNA exonuclease Trex1 regulates radiotherapy-induced tumour immunogenicity". Nature Communications. 8 15618. Bibcode:2017NatCo...815618V. doi:10.1038/NCOMMS15618. ISSN 2041-1723. PMC 5472757. PMID 28598415.
