= Walpole prison strike =

1973 Boston-area prison officer strike and period of inmate self-governance

Following a March 1973 prison officer strike, the inmates of Walpole state prison, a high-security facility outside Boston, ran the prison under watch of citizen observers for two months during a policy impasse with the prison officers' union and the state corrections commissioner.

== Background ==
Located outside Boston, Walpole state prison was Massachusetts's highest security prison in its time. In 1973, the year of the strike, Walpole was known among the most violent prisons in the country, with regular stabbings and murders, unclean facilities, and severe psychological stress for inmates and prison officers alike.

John Boone became Massachusetts's Corrections Commissioner in January 1972, loaned from a federal position. The Walpole prison had major incidents in his early months and a six-week lockdown in the Walpole prison, starting in December 1972, escalated tensions.

== Prison officer strike ==
The night of March 8, the prisoners voted to return to their prison jobs, ending their strike and allowing external observers in, signaling support for Boone's request for cooperation in return for good faith negotiations and 24-hour citizen observers. Rumors began to spread that the prison officers intended to strike.

The morning of March 14, 1973, the prison officers (guards) of Walpole's day shift called in sick, beginning a walkout action. One prison officer handed the prison's keys to the head of the civilian observer program. Corrections Commissioner John Boone called a state of emergency.

The striking prison officers had intended the walkout to call negative attention to the policies of Boone's administration. Boone, in turn, anticipated the walkout to backfire and break the officers' union that blocked his prison reform plans. The prison's management was handed to a combination of the prisoners' newly created union, civilian observers, and a skeleton crew of trainees and officers.

== Prisoners union ==
The prisoners formed a union to collectively bargain for improvements to working conditions and safety. Following an election in which 87 percent of the 540 inmates supported the union, they became a chapter of the National Prisoner Reform Association (NPRA). The state's correction commissioner accepted the group as the prisoners' authorized representatives for resolving grievances in April. The group's leadership articulated goals including inmate participation in the self-governance of the prison, i.e., "a say in how it's run". The guards union opposed their unionization as creating a slippery slope in which the prisoners would request more aspects of their incarceration.

The NPRA union was the main governance at Walpole between March 15 and May 19, 1973. During this period, the prison's security, policy, kitchen, and foundry were run by the prisoners. Various factions in the prison negotiated a truce at the beginning of the prison officer's strike.There were no murders and violence was minimal. Civilian observers continued to volunteer at the prison, and their 10,000 recorded hours included documentation of the prisoners' self-governance.

== Return of officers ==
Court order ended the officers' strike.

Massachusetts governor Francis W. Sargent forced Corrections Commissioner Boone to resign in June. The governor had been under pressure to fire Boone, who he said had become a symbol of the Walpole events. Sargent ordered the State Police into the prison, with their captain, Colonel John Moriarty as the prison's temporary superintendent. He immediately instituted a series of security measures including halting the prison's visitor and furlough programs, increasing internal patrols, and conducting background checks on civilian observers. He said the observer program would continue with restrictions. The Associated Press cited additional murders at Walpole in the lead-up to Boone's resignation.

== Legacy ==
The strike is commonly regarded as either a failure of custodial control, for lack of adequate resourcing, or a radical experiment in participatory democracy. The film 3000 Years and Life documents the incident as an experiment in self-governance.

The prison officers walked out in 1978 and 1979 over on-time paychecks and segregation unit policy, respectively.

== See also ==
- Attica Prison riot

== Bibliography ==
- Berk, Christopher D. (2018). "On Prison Democracy: The Politics of Participation in a Maximum Security Prison". Critical Inquiry. 44 (2): 275–302. doi:10.1086/695361. ISSN 0093-1896.
