= Israel López =

Israel López may refer to:

- Israel "Cachao" López, Cuban mambo musician, bassist and composer
- Israel López (footballer), Mexican football player
