= Filmfest DC =

Annual international film festival in Washington, D.C.

Washington DC, International Film Festival
- Founded: 1987
- Founded by: Tony Gittens
- Directors: Tony Gittens
- Website: www.filmfestdc.org

The Washington, DC International Film Festival, known as Filmfest DC, is an annual film festival held each spring in Washington, D.C., United States. Founded by Tony Gittens and first held in 1987, it is the oldest and largest international film festival in the District of Columbia and one of the city's longest-running major cultural events.

== History ==
Gittens, a Howard University graduate and former civil rights organizer, established the Black Film Institute at the University of the District of Columbia (UDC) in 1976 to screen work by and about African and African-American filmmakers. As audience demand grew, the series was expanded into an international event; Gittens said it took two years to mount, and during the first year as Filmfest DC in 1987, 50 films from 23 countries were screened. Reported attendance at the first edition was about 5,000.

Screenings were initially held at independent Washington cinemas including the Biograph, the Circle Theatres, the Foundry, and the Jenifer, as well as in prisons, schools, and nursing homes; as those venues closed the festival moved to larger houses such as Landmark E Street Cinema and Mazza Gallerie, and more recently Regal Gallery Place.

Gittens directed the festival while serving from 1997 to 2008 as executive director of the DC Commission on the Arts and Humanities, a city agency that awarded grants to Filmfest DC among hundreds of other local arts organizations. A 2007 Washington Post report questioned whether the dual role constituted a conflict of interest; Gittens denied any conflict and said the coverage had no effect on the festival. He nonetheless left the commission in July 2008 under a retirement incentive after 11 years, remaining festival director. The 2020 festival was postponed and held online because of the COVID-19 pandemic, and the 2021 edition was staged as a hybrid event.

== Programming ==
Filmfest DC runs for eleven days and presents more than 65 feature premieres alongside documentaries, animation, and short films, most of them Washington premieres. Programmers review roughly 300 to 350 submissions annually and scout festivals including Cannes and Toronto before selecting the slate. Films are grouped into recurring thematic sections such as World View, Justice Matters, The Lighter Side, Trust No One, and Global Rhythms. Screenings are supplemented by director appearances, panels, and question-and-answer sessions, and the festival partners with embassies in Washington. It also produces Arabian Sights, a separate showcase of Arab cinema.

By its 40th edition in 2026, the festival reported having presented more than 3,600 feature and short films from over 144 countries. Annual attendance has been reported at between 11,000 and 25,000.

== Awards ==
Prizes include the Audience Award for the most popular feature; the Ted Pedas Award, a juried prize named for Ted and Jim Pedas, founders of Washington's Circle Theatres; the Justice Matters Award; the Signis Award, presented by the international Catholic media organization SIGNIS; and the Short Stories and MetroShorts awards for emerging filmmakers.
