= Peter Emanuel Goldman =

American film director

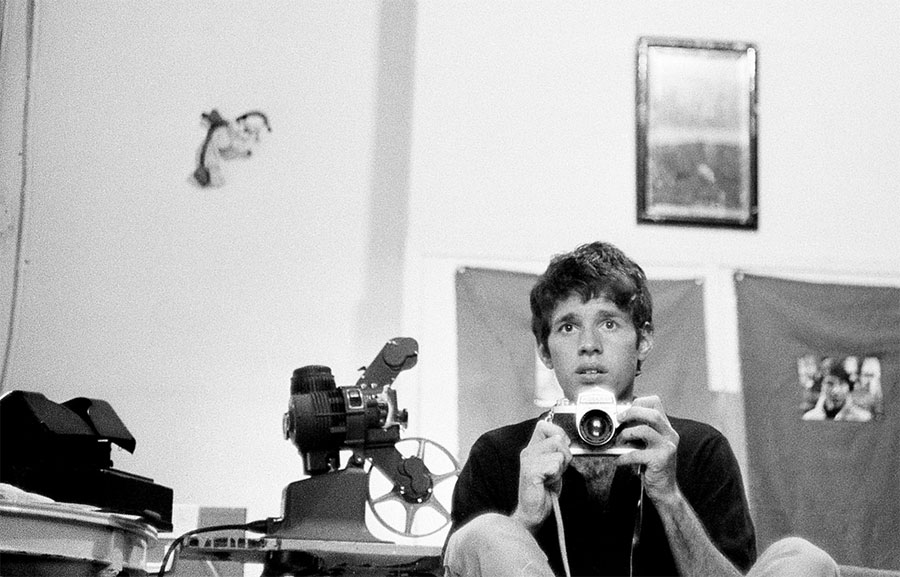
- Born: 5 June 1939; New York City, USA
- Citizenship: USA; American
- Education: Brown University
- Occupations: Film director; Photographer; Foreign Affairs Writer & Consultant
- Years active: 1962-1987
- Movement: avant-garde underground cinema French New Wave

Peter Emanuel Goldman (born June 5, 1939) is an American filmmaker, writer and investigative columnist. He was widely recognized as the connection between the New American (Underground) cinema and the French New Wave during the 1960s. Goldman was a director of independent feature films in New York and Paris and was highly praised by Newsweek, Susan Sontag, Jean-Luc Godard (who wrote that “Goldman stands alone” among young American filmmakers). His first feature, Echoes of Silence, became a landmark of the American Underground. This film, and a film shot in Paris, Wheel of Ashes (Roue de Cendres), played to critical acclaim at leading festivals including the New York, Venice Cannes, London and Pesaro film festivals.

Goldman's films are considered to be in a realm between the American Underground, the New York School of Cinema Verité, and the French New Wave. His black-and-white films offer a portrayal of youthful despair in 1960s Greenwich Village and Paris, alongside New York City.

== Biography ==
Goldman was born in 1939 In New York City. He graduated with a History and English degree from Brown University in 1960 and then went to Paris for a year to study history at La Sorbonne. In 1961 he enrolled at University of California, Berkeley but did not attend classes, spending much of his time in a boxing gym. Returning to New York after working as a cabin boy on a Norwegian tanker, he was given an old 8 mm camera by his father and began shooting street scenes in Greenwich Village. He made an hour-long documentary, New York, for a French tourist, who took the only copy back to France.. Thus, his first film has been lost forever. After buying a used 16mm Bolex camera, he returned to Paris for several months in the fall of 1962 and wrote about art for the Paris Herald Tribune.

His first feature film, Echoes of Silence, was shot sporadically during 1963 and 1964, fictionally chronicling the lives and adventures of an aimless young man wandering the streets of New York. He cast his friend, Argentinian sculptor Miguel Chacour in the lead role and the French Stasia Gelber. The silent film, budgeted at $1600, with a music track of Igor Stravinsky, Sergei Prokofiev and Charles Mingus taken from Goldman's records scattered around his floor. It was first shown publicly in February 1965 at the Filmmakers Cinematheque and a laudatory article by Jonas Mekas in The Village Voice. Echoes of Silence was so stylistically and thematically different that it astounded critics on both sides of the Atlantic. Writing in Combat (Paris) Henry Chapier called Echoes of Silence, “The most poignant film ever made about the profound despair of the young.” Susan Sontag said that “Goldman was “the most exciting filmmaker in recent years,” While Newsweek wrote that film contained “one of the truest, subtlest and moving sequences ever filmed.” The film was awarded a special director's prize at the Pesaro, Italy Film Festival (1966) by a jury of Jean-Luc Godard, Joris Ivens, Bernardo Bertolucci, Jaromil Jires and Marco Bellocchio and Valentino Orsini. Later in 1966 the film was shown at the New York Film Festival. and London film festivals.

During 1963 Goldman left New York for several months and worked as a reporter for The Providence Journal, highlighted by an interview with Alma Mahler, the widow of German composer Gustav Mahler.

During 1963 or 1964 Goldman made two short films, Recommended by Duncan Hines –a tongue-in-cheek formal dinner on the floor of a moving N.Y. City subway car—and Nightcrawlers—a nightmare look at 42nd Street filmed in slow motion negative.

After completing Echoes of Silence in early 1965, Goldman went to Mexico and began a second feature, Reflections on a Mexican Vision, but stopped production halfway through because he was not happy with the results. Instead, he shot Pestilent City, a 15-minute short where New York City becomes “Dante’s Second Circle of Hell” – poverty, violence, madness, passing out, drunkenness, an infernal vision of lost roaming souls with misery the only common possession—“a cry of rage tossed at the throat of New York.” Several critics saw this film as precursor to Scorsese's Taxi Driver, especially the music which Goldman composed. Pestilent City was selected two times by the New York Film Festival.

In early 1966 he completed the feature film-length film, The Sensualists, The film was commissioned for $10,000 by producer Stanley Borden to be a sexploitation film, but Goldman made a half-sexploitation – half art film. Film director Brian De Palma wrote a satirical article in The Village Voice where he noted Borden's unhappiness with the film. However, the film was shown widely in B cinemas around the country, but all copies have either been lost or destroyed.

Echoes of Silence was scheduled to have its commercial opening at the Cinéma Quartier Latin in Paris in November 1966, but it was banned by the French Censorship (it was also banned in Italy). It finally had its commercial opening in April 1967 at the New Yorker Theater in New York City.

Goldman returned to Europe and shot his next film Wheel of Ashes, starring Pierre Clémenti. It premiered at the 1968 Venice Film Festival.

This film came after Goldman had moved to Paris with his family with the aid of Godard, when Goldman was awarded a Fulbright Scholarship in film. Goldman was awarded a Doctor of Naturopathy degree in 1967 and in 1968 he completed his third feature film, Wheel of Ashes (Roue de Cendres) a French- language film starring Pierre Clémenti – then between starring roles with Buñuel and Pasolini. Goldman's wife, Birgit, played the female lead (as she did in The Sensualists). The film centers on a spiritual and mystical crisis where Cleménti's character is torn apart by a three-way conflict--- his sexual desires, his wanting to become a saint (influenced by Vedanta) and family life. Many Americans who showed up in Paris at the time, including Sean Flynn, Ted Joans and Judith Malina, were given cameos in the film.

While Wheel of Ashes has a more traditional narrative (as well as dialogue) than Echoes of Silence's lyrical narrative, many of the same wanderings, emotions and superb B&W photography were transported from New York to Paris but now spurred by existential spiritual conflicts. Due to a forced break in the editing caused by the student revolt in May ’68, the film was rushed for its premier at the Venice Film Festival in August 1968. Goldman felt the film was too long and recut and shortened the film a few months later. Wheel of Ashes had short runs in several European countries with excellent and sometimes extraordinary reviews, but it was never shown in the States outside of museums. Besides Venice, the film was shown at several festivals including Cannes, Hof (Germany) and Play-Doc (Spain).

Goldman and Clémenti had huge disagreements during the shoot. Clémenti wanted to “act” while Goldman wanted to “be,” to let the camera do the acting. In Goldman's unique style of directing it is the image that carries the story along with light, movement, faces and music. Dialogue is secondary.

After completing the film, Goldman underwent a spiritual and psychological crisis but managed to play a half season at third base for the French national baseball champions, Les Pirates de Paris (the Paris Pirates) before moving to Denmark. In Denmark he served as the executive director of Samvirket Danmark-Israel (Denmark-Israel Association), writing many articles and letters in the Danish newspapers and writing and publishing a half dozen short books on the Arab-Israel conflict. He also worked as a stringer for NBC Radio News, broadcasting from Copenhagen.

Returning to the United States in 1978 he worked as an Information Officer at the Israeli Embassy in Washington (1979–81), as executive director for the Center for International security (1981), a think-tank for military, defense and international issues, and then as executive director for Americans for a Safe Israel (AFSI), with offices in New York and Washington (1982–87). While at AFSI he made a documentary about Media bias, NBC in Lebanon: A Study of Media Misrepresentation (1983), about which New York Times TV critic John Corry wrote that the film “mostly does prove” that NBC Nightly News coverage of the 1982 war between Israel and the PLO was biased against Israel and that this “raises significant questions about television journalism.” While working for AFSI he was a consultant to many senators and was invited to the White House to speak with President Reagan and his staff.

In 1985 Goldman co-edited (with Stephen Karetsky) The Media's War against Israel (Steimatsky-Shapolsky publishers).

In 1987 Goldman decided to return to filmmaking and wrote a comedic screenplay, Dance at My Weddings. He received an advance from a small Hollywood production company, but due to a series of mishaps (stolen money, Bernie Madoff, bankruptcies, the COVID-19 outbreak) the film was never made.

In 1997 Goldman, now a “Torah-observant” Jew, was invited to Israel to investigate the 1995 assassination of former Israeli Prime Minister, Yitzhak Rabin, and discovered a slew of documents which seemed to prove that convicted killer, Yigal Amir, was innocent. He turned the documents and tapes over to Israeli investigative reporter, Barry Chamish, who used some of them in his Israeli best-selling book, Who Murdered Yitzhak Rabin?

In April 2015 Goldman had his first still photography exhibit at the Art Media Gallery in Miami of his 1960s photos shot mostly in Greenwich Village. This led to several other exhibitions in Miami, Paris and Spain. The negatives and contact sheets had been lost for almost 50 years until they were rediscovered in Paris and sent to Miami. Curator and art historian, Jose-Antonio Navarrete, wrote “Goldman’s archive introduces an unknown chapter in the history of American photography from the early to the mid-sixties---sex, love, desire, passion, drugs, nightlife, sadness, despair, loneliness – which would not appear in photography until the following decade with Nan Goldin, the photographer of ‘sexual dependency.’”

In late 2013 Re:Voir Video in Paris released on DVD three of Goldman’s films( Echoes of Silence, Wheel of Ashes, Pestilent City). This resulted in a spate of articles in cinema magazines and other media outlets, sparking a renewed interest in his forgotten work.

Although he stood apart, his work was often considered as part of the Beat generation. In 2016 he was selected as one of 80 Beatnik artists by the Centre Pompidou for its large exhibition, “Beat Generation,” and the French daily, Humanité, called Echoes of Silence, “This cinematic gem of the Beat Generation.”

In 2018 Goldman was the guest of honor at the Play-Doc Film Festival in Tui, Spain, where all of his available films and fragments were shown.

Goldman was married three times to the former Birgit Nielsen (aka Katinka Bo), Christina Weidenmark and Natalia Alperina. He has three children, Nepo (b.1966), Elin (b. 1974) and Vera Michal (b.1993)

Raised as an assimilated Jew in New York, Goldman had little connection to his heritage until the slaughter of the Israeli athletes, in the Munich massacre, by the PLO at the 1972 Summer Olympics. He was living in Denmark at the time. “I felt they were shooting at me,” he said. He became a committed Zionist and eventually headed two pro-Israel organizations in Denmark.

After returning to the U.S., Goldman attended Shabbat services in Silver Spring, Maryland. The experience acted as a catalyst for his burgeoning self awareness. His reaction was, “I’m a Jew and I had better shape up.”

Goldman was married to a non-Jew at the time and they had a daughter together. He was compelled to make an agonizing decision. Goldman says, “I loved my wife and child, but she would not convert and after several years of terrible conflict and anguish I left the marriage.” He had committed to becoming a Torah-observant Jew.

Goldman served as head of Americans for a Safe Israel during the 1980s. He directed its 1983 documentary NBC in Lebanon: A Study in Media Misrepresentation, which alleged that NBC Nightly News' coverage of the 1982 Lebanon War was biased against Israel in favor of the Palestine Liberation Organization.

== Legacy ==
Peter Emanuel Goldman's legacy lies in his profound yet understated impact on underground cinema and visual art. Though his films were relatively obscure during their time, they have since gained cult status, celebrated for their raw emotional intensity and poetic portrayal of alienation. His debut film, Echoes of Silence, with its stark, dialogue-free depiction of New York's disaffected youth, is now regarded as a seminal work of independent cinema. Goldman's visual and thematic style, marked by gritty realism and existential longing, influenced filmmakers such as Martin Scorsese, whose Taxi Driver echoes the bleak urban despair seen in Goldman's Pestilent City.

His photographic work, which captured the raw intimacy of 1960s counterculture, also earned him belated recognition, drawing comparisons to later artists like Nan Goldin. In 2013, the release of his films by Re:Voir Video introduced his work to a new generation of cinephiles, cementing his place in avant-garde film history. His influence was further celebrated in 2016 when he was featured in the Centre Pompidou's Beat Generation exhibition in Paris, and again in 2018, when he was honored at the Play-Doc Film Festival in Spain, where his entire filmography was screened. Though he remains a somewhat enigmatic figure, Goldman's hauntingly beautiful films and photography continue to resonate, offering a timeless exploration of human vulnerability and the search for meaning.

== Filmography ==
As of 2025, Goldman has directed 3 full-length films, 3 short-length films and 2 documentary films.

Directed narrative features
Year	Title	Type
1962	New York Documentary - lost	documentary
1964	Recommended by Duncan Hines	short
1964	Nightcrawlers	short
1965	Echoes of Silence	feature
1965	Pestilent City	short
1966	The Sensualists	feature
1968	Wheel of Ashes	feature
1983	NBC in Lebanon: A Study of Media Misrepresentation	documentary
