= Attica Prison riot =

1971 prisoner rebellion in New York

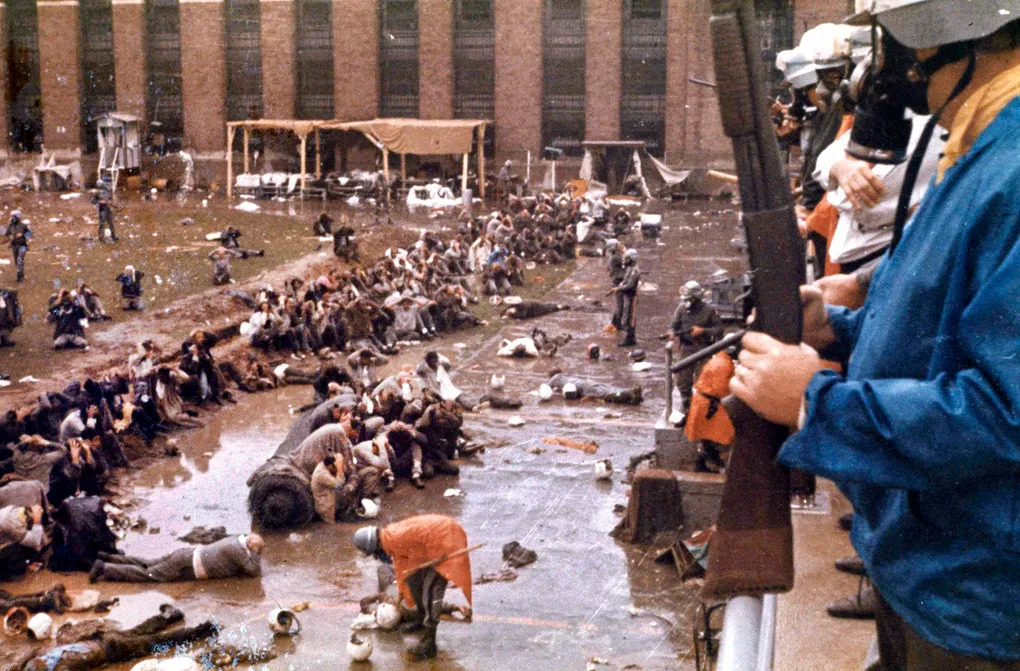
- State troopers stand guard over prisoners after retaking Attica Correctional Facility during the riot.
Date	September 9–13, 1971
Location	Attica, New York, U.S. 42°50′59″N 78°16′18″W

Belligerents
Attica inmates	(New York (state)) State of New York; (New York (state)) New York State Police; (New York (state)) New York State Department of Corrections; (New York (state)) New York Army National Guard; Local Sheriff Offices; Wyoming County; Niagara County; Monroe County; Ontario County; Erie County; Genesee State Park Police

Commanders and leaders
Herbert X. Blyden (Note: Elected by inmates as a lead negotiator); Frank Lott; Peter Butler; Donald "Don" Noble; Carl Jones-El; Frank "Big Black" Smith (Note: Inmate responsible for the safety of hostages and observers); Richard X. Clark (Note: Head of the inmates and hostages internal security and served as a liaison between the inmates of D-yard and the authorities); Cleveland McKinley "Jomo" Davis; Elliott James "L.D." Barkley †	Governor Nelson Rockefeller; Commissioner Russell G. Oswald (Department of Corrections); Deputy Commissioner Walter Dunbar (Department of Corrections); Warden Vincent Ralph Mancusi (Attica Prison); Assistant Deputy Warden Karl Pfeil (Attica Prison); Superintendent William Kirwan (State Police); Chief Inspector John C. Miller (State Police); Major John Monahan (State Police); Lieutenant Joseph P. Christian (State Police) (GSW)

Strength
1,281 inmates	74 correctional officers (Note: Who had avoided becoming hostages); 550 state troopers
- 42 correctional officers and civilian workers taken hostage

Casualties and losses
33 inmates killed (3 by other inmates) (Note: Three inmates killed by other inmates before the assault, 30 killed by police fire during the assault); 85 inmates wounded	10 correctional officers killed (9 by correctional officers) (Note: One died from a head injury sustained before the assault, eight were killed by friendly fire during the assault, and one died later from gunshot wounds from friendly fire during the assault); 5 correctional officers wounded during the assault (Note: Three by friendly fire, two by inmates' knives); 1 state trooper wounded (Note: By friendly fire)

The Attica Prison riot took place at the Attica Correctional Facility state prison in Attica, New York. The riot started on September 9, 1971, with a violent takeover of the prison control center in which one prison officer, William Quinn, was killed. It ended on September 13 with the highest number of fatalities in the history of United States prison riots. Of the 43 men who died (33 inmates and 10 correctional officers and employees), all but one guard and three inmates were killed by law enforcement gunfire when the state retook control of the prison on the final day of the riot. The Attica riot has been described as a historic event in the prisoners' rights movement.

Prisoners revolted to seek better living conditions and political rights, claiming that they were treated as beasts. On September 9, 1971, 1,281 of the approximately 2,200 men incarcerated in the Attica Correctional Facility rioted and took control of the prison, taking 42 staff hostage. During the four days of negotiations, authorities agreed to the majority of the prisoners' 28 demands, but did not accept the demand for the removal of Attica's warden or to allow the inmates complete amnesty from criminal prosecution for the prison takeover. By order of Governor Nelson Rockefeller (after consultation with President Richard M. Nixon), armed corrections officers and state and local police were sent in to regain control of the prison. By the time they stopped firing, at least 39 people were dead: 10 correctional officers and civilian employees and 29 inmates, with nearly all killed by law enforcement gunfire. Law enforcement subjected many of the survivors to various forms of torture, including sexual violence.

Rockefeller had refused to go to the prison or meet with prisoners. After the riot was suppressed, he stated that the prisoners "carried out the cold-blood killings they had threatened from the outset". Medical examiners confirmed that all but the deaths of one officer and three inmates were caused by law enforcement gunfire. The New York Times writer Fred Ferretti said the rebellion concluded in "mass deaths that four days of taut negotiations had sought to avert".

As a result of the riot, the New York Corrections Department made changes in prisons to satisfy some of the prisoners' demands, reduce tension in the system, and prevent such incidents in the future. While there were improvements to prison conditions in the years immediately following the uprising, many of these improvements were reversed in the 1980s and 1990s. Attica remains one of the most infamous prison riots to have occurred in the United States.

== Background ==
Many of the prisoners in Attica participated in the riot because they desired better living conditions. Historian Howard Zinn wrote the following about the conditions in Attica prior to the uprising,

Prisoners spent 14 to 16 hours a day in their cells, their mail was read, their reading material restricted, their visits from families conducted through a mesh screen, their medical care disgraceful, their parole system inequitable, racism everywhere.

Overcrowding contributed to the poor conditions, as in recent years the prison's population had increased from the 1,200 prisoners for which it was designed, to 2,243.

Additionally, as in many American prisons, racial disparities existed at Attica. Within the prison population, 54% of the incarcerated men were African American, 9% of them were Puerto Rican, and 37% of them were white. The guards often threw out letters written in Spanish to or from Puerto Rican prisoners, and relegated black prisoners to the lowest-paid jobs and subjected them to regular racial harassment. Racist treatment by prison guards fueled prisoners' anger.

The previous year, multiple rebellions occurred throughout the New York City Jail system. Inmates at the Manhattan House of Detention held five guards hostage for eight hours, until state officials promised to hear prisoner grievances and they also promised not to take any punitive action against the rioters. Despite that promise, officials had the primary ringleaders shipped to various New York State Prisons and many were brutalized, held for months in solitary confinement and faced further criminal charges. Incarcerated people and state authorities in Auburn Correctional Facility engaged in an ongoing conflict and confrontation between November 2, 1970, and June 9, 1971. Several participants in what came to be known as the Auburn prison riot were subsequently transferred to other New York State prisons, including Attica.

In July 1971, a group of Attica inmates presented a list of 27 demands regarding improvements in living conditions in Attica to state Commissioner of Corrections Russell Oswald and Governor Nelson Rockefeller. These demands included improvements in multiple areas such as diet, the quality of guards, rehabilitation programs, and, in particular, education programs. The inmates also demanded increased religious freedom, the ability to engage in political activity, and an end to censorship, which they argued were all vital to a proper education within the prison. The commissioner did not take any actions on the list of demands. Attica warden Vincent Mancusi responded by adding additional restrictions to inmates' reading materials and personal belongings.

In August 1971, George Jackson, an author and prominent member of the Black Panther Party, was shot and killed during an escape attempt in which three prison guards and two white inmates were murdered at San Quentin State Prison in California. Through his writings, Jackson had encouraged imprisoned people throughout the United States to become politically active. Many incarcerated people in Attica had read Jackson's books and cited Jackson's death as a major catalyst for the riot. The day after Jackson's death, at least 700 Attica inmates participated in a hunger strike in his honor.

== Initial uprising ==
On Wednesday, September 8, 1971, two inmates fought during their recreation break, and a correctional officer came up to intervene. One inmate had already left the area, but the officer demanded the remaining inmate return to his cell, and in the ensuing argument the inmate hit the officer. Other inmates and guards joined the commotion, and another inmate also hit the same officer, Lt. Richard Maroney, but before the violence could intensify, Lieutenant Robert Curtiss moved to deescalate the situation. Later that evening, warden Vincent Mancusi ordered the two inmates involved in the altercation, Leroy Dewer and Ray Lamorie, to be taken to solitary confinement, but when the officers arrived at 5 Company to take the inmates away, other prisoners resisted. The other inmates in 5 Company shouted and threw things at the guards and one inmate, William Ortiz, hit an officer, Tom Boyle, with a can of soup, resulting in him being assigned to "keep lock", or confinement to his cell.

The morning of Thursday, September 9, 1971, prisoners of 5 Company were still upset and demanded that officers tell them what would become of Ortiz. Officer Gordon Kelsey told them he did not know and tried to continue the routine. As inmates headed to breakfast, some managed to open Ortiz's cell door and he left with them to the mess hall. When the command staff found out what had occurred, they decided to return all of the men of 5 Company to their cells after breakfast but they did not inform all the correctional officers, and when officers led inmates out toward the recreation area after breakfast, both officers and inmates were surprised to find the doors locked. The inmates believed they were about to be punished and a melee broke out, which resulted in chaos as some inmates attacked the guards and others tried to flee. The chaos spread to other nearby companies of inmates, and the uprising began. During this stage, several guards and inmates were injured. Officer William Quinn would die in the hospital two days later of injuries sustained during the initial riot.

By noon on September 9, correctional officers and police controlled about half the prison and its inmates, while 1,281 of Attica's approximately 2,200 inmates controlled the other half, including D-yard, two tunnels, and the central control room, referred to as "Times Square". Inmates held 42 officers and civilian employees as hostages.

== Negotiations ==
Once inmates had secured their section of the prison, they began organizing. Inmates elected leaders to represent them in negotiations, appointed inmates to serve as medics and security, and began drafting a list of demands for officials to meet before they would surrender. For example, Frank "Big Black" Smith (September 11, 1933 – July 31, 2004) was chosen to be head of security, to keep negotiators from outside safe. Additionally, 21-year-old Elliott James "L.D." Barkley, an ardent orator, was a strong force during the negotiations. He spoke eloquently to the inmates, journalist camera crews, and viewers at home. Barkley, just days away from his scheduled release at the time of the uprising, was killed during the recapturing of the prison.

We are men! We are not beasts and we do not intend to be beaten or driven as such. The entire prison populace, that means every one of us here, has set forth to change forever the ruthless brutalization and disregard for the lives of the prisoners here and throughout the United States. What has happened here is but the sound before the fury of those who are oppressed. We will not compromise on any terms except those terms that are agreeable to us. We've called upon all the conscientious citizens of America to assist us in putting an end to this situation that threatens the lives of not only us but of every one of you, as well.

— Declaration to the People of America, Read by Elliott James "L.D." Barkley, September 9, 1971

As speakers such as Barkley raised morale, the elected group of negotiators drafted proposals to present to the commissioner. The Attica Liberation Faction Manifesto of Demands was a compilation of complaints written by the Attica prisoners, which speak directly to the "sincere people of society". It included 33 demands, including better medical treatment, fair visitation rights, improved food quality, religious freedom, higher wages for inmate jobs, "an end of physical abuse, for [access to] basic necessities like toothbrushes and showers every day, for professional training, and access to newspapers and books." The manifesto assigns the power to negotiate to five inmates elected to represent the others: Donald Noble, Peter Butler, Frank Lott, Carl Jones-El, and Herbert Blyden X. Additionally, the document specifically lists "vile and vicious slave masters" who oppressed the prisoners, such as the New York governor, New York corrections, and the United States courts.

Inmates requested a team of outside observers to assist with negotiations, whom they considered knowledgeable of prison conditions, many of whom officials were able to persuade to come to Attica. Observers included Tom Wicker, an editor of The New York Times; James Ingram of the Michigan Chronicle; State Senator John Dunne, head of a Prisons Committee in the legislature; State Representative Arthur Eve; U.S. congressman from New York and attorney Herman Badillo; civil rights lawyer William Kunstler; Clarence B. Jones, publisher of the Amsterdam News in New York and former advisor to Martin Luther King Jr.; representatives of the Young Lords, and others. Prisoners requested Minister Louis Farrakhan, national representative of the Nation of Islam, but he declined. Inmates also requested representatives from the Black Panther Party; Bobby Seale addressed the inmates briefly on September 11 but did not stay long and some believed that he inflamed tensions.

The prisoners and team of observers continued to negotiate with Commissioner of Corrections Russell Oswald, who agreed to 28 of the inmates' demands, but refused to agree to amnesty for the inmates involved in the uprising or to fire the Attica warden. William Kunstler, a lawyer who agreed to represent the inmates in negotiations, said, "The prisoners had two non-negotiable demands: the removal of the warden, and general amnesty, and they had already given up on the removal of the warden. And on the general amnesty, we had worked out several formulas that we were discussing with the commissioner hours before the attack, and if we had been allowed to continue, everyone would be alive and the matter would be settled today."

The situation may have been further complicated by Governor Rockefeller's refusal even to come to the prison or meet with the inmates. Instead, Rockefeller dispatched Commissioner of the Office of General Services Almerin C. O'Hara, a retired National Guard major general, as his personal representative and liaison. Because Rockefeller was unwilling to compromise, some analysts' later evaluations of the incident postulated that Rockefeller's absence prevented the situation from deteriorating. Negotiations broke down, as Oswald was unwilling or unable to make further concessions to the inmates. Oswald and members of the observers committee called Rockefeller and begged him to come to the prison to calm the situation, but he refused. Following the governor's refusal, Oswald and Rockefeller agreed that Oswald would order the State Police to retake the facility by force, a decision which was later criticized.

== Retaking of the prison and retaliations ==
On the night of Sunday, September 12, 1971, plans were drawn up to retake the prison by force. Members of the team of observers argued for Oswald to deliver to inmates one final appeal for a settlement before the forcible retaking. Oswald agreed, but was instructed not to phrase the demand as an ultimatum, as Rockefeller did not want to let inmates know that the assault was beginning. At 8:25 a.m. on Monday, September 13, 1971, Oswald gave the inmates a statement directing them to release the hostages and accept the offered settlement within the hour. However, he did not tell them that negotiations had ended and he would take the prison back by force if they refused, even stating, "I want to continue negotiations with you." The inmates rejected his offer, and as it appeared to them as though Rockefeller remained opposed to their demands the mood among the inmates deteriorated.

In preparation for prison authorities potentially taking the prison back by force, inmates had dug defensive trenches, electrified metal gates, fashioned crude battlements out of metal tables and dirt, and fortified the "Times Square" prison command center. After Oswald left following the inmates' rejection of his latest offer, the inmates decided to try to impress upon prison officials that they were serious about their demands, and to remind them that inmates had power over the hostages if the state was to come in by force. The inmates brought eight corrections officers to the catwalk on top of the command center and surrounded them with inmates armed with homemade weapons. According to surviving inmates, they did not intend to kill the hostages, but rather to use them as insurance. Shortly after inmates and hostages were positioned on the catwalk, Oswald gave the order to begin the retaking. Of the decision, he later said, "On a much smaller scale, I think I have some feeling now of how Truman must have felt when he decided to drop the A-bomb."

At 9:46 a.m. on Monday, September 13, 1971, tear gas was dropped into the yard and hundreds of New York State Police troopers, Bureau of Criminal Investigation personnel, deputy sheriffs, park police, and correctional officers opened fire into the smoke. Among the weapons used by the troopers were shotguns loaded with buckshot pellets, which led to the wounding and killing of hostages and inmates who were not resisting. Correctional officers from Attica were allowed to participate, a decision later called "inexcusable" by the commission established by Rockefeller to study the riot and the aftermath. By the time the facility was reported as fully secured at 10:05 a.m., law enforcement had shot at least 128 men and killed nine hostages and twenty-nine inmates. The ninth hostage, Correctional Officer Harrison W. Whalen, died on October 9, 1971, of gunshot wounds received during the assault.

A team of doctors who treated the survivors said that they were told that the police had fired indiscriminately and killed unresisting people. According to a doctor, "[m]any of the ringleaders were approached by guards and shot systematically. Some had their hands in the air surrendering. Some were lying on the ground." One of the leaders, Elliott James "L.D." Barkley, who was frequently featured in news coverage, was alive after the initial retaking. Assemblyman Arthur Eve testified that Barkley was alive after the prisoners had surrendered and the state regained control; another inmate stated that the officers searched Barkley out, yelling his name, and executed him with a shot to the back. Sam Melville, a member of the committee that helped organize and draft inmates' demands and who was known in the prison as a radical, was shot while he had his hands in the air trying to surrender.

The final death toll from the rebellion also includes the officer fatally injured by inmates during the initial uprising and three inmates who were subjected to vigilante killings by fellow inmates before the retaking of the prison. Ten hostages died from gunfire by state troopers and soldiers. The New York State Special Commission on Attica wrote, "With the exception of Indian massacres in the late 19th century, the State Police assault which ended the four-day prison uprising was the bloodiest one-day encounter between Americans since the Civil War."

State officials, including Oswald and Rockefeller, initially stated that inmates slit the throats of many of their hostages The false information was widely reported in the media. but less than 24 hours later, official medical examiners confirmed that all the hostages had been killed by bullets fired by law enforcement officers. The Special Commission found that state officials failed to quickly refute the early rumors and false reports.

Troopers and prison officers set about with physically violent and humiliating reprisals. Inmates were made to strip naked and crawl through mud, broken glass, and the prisoners' hand-dug latrines. State officials also subjected the prisoners to sexual violence and rape. Directed into the prison, they were forced to run hallways naked between lines of enraged officers, who beat the inmates and yelled insults and racial slurs. Some inmates, including leaders such as Frank Smith, were subject to additional reprisals and punishments, including repeated physical abuse and being locked in solitary confinement. Several days after the uprising's end, doctors treating wounded inmates reported evidence of more beatings. As the repression was happening in Attica, incarcerated people in other New York State Prisons, especially Auburn Correctional Facility and Clinton Correctional Facility, were subjected to similar forms of violence. Many of these men had previously been incarcerated in Attica and had been involved in political organizations.

== Public response ==
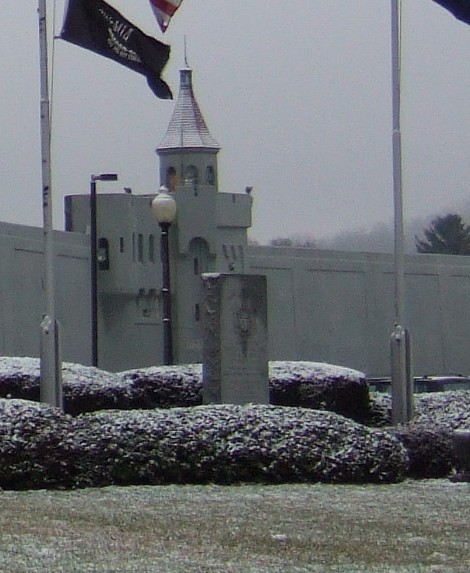
Memorial in front of the prison to the officers and other prison employees who died in the uprising. All but one were killed by friendly fire.

Following the uprising, protests and riots occurred in prisons across the United States, including in prisons in New York, Massachusetts, Indiana, Michigan, West Virginia, and Georgia. According to a Prisoners Solidarity Committee newsletter from September 30, 1971, "[t]he 13 reported rebellions since the Attica massacre doubles the total number of reported prison rebellions since the beginning of this year". Numerous rallies in support of the prisoners occurred, especially in New York, but also in cities as far away as Los Angeles and Norman, Oklahoma; several rallies in support of Governor Rockefeller also took place. In addition, activists such as Angela Davis and artists such as John Lennon wrote works in support of the inmates and condemning the official response.

At 7:30 p.m. on September 17, militant left-wing organization the Weather Underground launched a retaliatory attack on the New York Department of Corrections, exploding a bomb near Oswald's office. "The communiqué accompanying the attack called the prison system an example of 'how a society run by white racists maintains its control,' with white supremacy being the 'main question white people have to face.'"

In response to public criticism, in November 1971 Governor Rockefeller established the New York State Special Commission on Attica, appointing members and naming Dean of NYU Law School Robert B. McKay as chair. Known as the McKay Commission, the commission was directed to investigate the circumstances leading up to, during, and following the events at Attica. The commission's report, published in September 1972, was critical of Rockefeller, the Department of Corrections, and New York State Police for their handling of the prison retaking and for their negligence in protecting inmates from reprisals after the riot.

== Lawsuits and payments ==
In October 1971, Robert Fischer was appointed as Special Deputy Attorney General to lead the Attica Task Force and was charged with investigating any criminal acts that may have been committed during the uprising or retaking (Fischer was later succeeded as the Attica Task Force leader by Anthony Simonetti). Within four years of the uprising, 62 inmates had been charged in 42 indictments with 1,289 separate counts. One state trooper was indicted for reckless endangerment. In May 1975, two former inmates were convicted in the death of William Quinn, despite the fact that "[o]nly faltering evidence linked the two inmates to the actual beating that left Quinn dead". Charles Pernasilice, who was Catawba Indian, was sentenced to a term of up to two years for attempted assault, and John Hill, who was Mohawk, was convicted of murder and sentenced to 20 years to life. Supporters argued that the trial was unfairly conducted and that the men's ethnicity contributed to their indictment and conviction, with Hill's lawyer William Kunstler saying at the sentencing, "I'm not going to give the impression to the outside world that there is justice here."

In 1975, Malcolm Bell, a prosecutor in the Attica Task Force, sent a report to Governor Hugh Carey alleging that his superiors were covering up evidence of criminal actions by law enforcement officers in the retaking of Attica and preventing him from fully investigating and prosecuting law enforcement. After Bell's report was leaked to the public, Carey appointed Judge Bernard S. Meyer of the Supreme Court for Nassau County, New York to the post of Special Deputy Attorney General to investigate. The Meyer Report, released in December 1975, found "[t]here was no intentional cover-up", but "there were, however, serious errors of judgment" including "important omissions on the part of the State Police in the gathering of evidence."

Initially, only the first of the three-volume Meyer report was released to the public; in 1981 the State Supreme Court ordered that the other two be sealed permanently. The Forgotten Victims of Attica, a group made up of officers injured in the riot and families of killed officers, pushed for the State of New York to release state records of the uprising to the public. In 2013, Attorney General Eric Schneiderman said he would seek release of the entirety of volumes 2 and 3, totaling 350 pages. After redactions, 46 pages of the report were released in May 2015. The released pages contain accounts from witnesses and inmates describing torture, burning, and sexual abuse of inmates by prison authorities. In 2021, the 50th anniversary of the uprising, the Forgotten Victims of Attica, surviving inmates, families of killed inmates, historians, and lawyers continued to push for the release of all records related to Attica.

In December 1976, Governor Carey announced he was "closing the book on Attica". He pardoned all inmates who had previously pleaded guilty to obtain reduced sentences, commuted the sentences of the two inmates convicted in court, and dismissed pending disciplinary actions against 20 law enforcement officers relating to the uprising.

Though the possibility of criminal suits was closed with Carey's decision, civil suits were allowed to proceed. Surviving inmates and families of inmates killed in the prison retaking sued the State of New York for civil rights violations by law enforcement officers and prison officials during and after the retaking of Attica. After decades in the courts, the state agreed in 2000 to pay $8 million ($12 million minus legal fees) to settle the case.

In 2005, the state separately settled with surviving prison employees and families of the slain prison employees for $12 million. Frank "Big Black" Smith advocated both for compensation for inmate survivors and the families of the deceased, and for their correctional officer counterparts who had been killed or injured and their bereaved as well.

== Effects on the New York State prison system ==
Partially in response to the Attica uprising, the New York State Department of Corrections implemented changes including:

1. Providing more basics such as more showers, soap, medical care, and family visits
2. Introducing a grievance procedure in which inmates could report actions by a staff member that violated published policy
3. Creating liaison committees in which inmates elect representatives to speak for them in meetings with prison officials
4. Allocating funding to Prisoners Legal Services, a statewide network of lawyers to assist inmates
5. Providing access to higher education
6. Allowing more religious freedom for inmates

While there were improvements in prison conditions in the years immediately following the uprising, during the "tough on crime" era of the 1980s and 1990s many of these improvements were reversed. For example, the 1994 Crime Bill eliminated all Pell Grants for prisoners, resulting in the defunding of higher education within prisons. As a result, all university-level education programs in prisons ended with no other educational options for inmates. Overcrowding worsened, with the prison population of New York increasing dramatically from 12,500 at the time of the Attica uprising to 72,600 in 1999. In 2011, after a man incarcerated in Attica was brutally beaten by guards, for the first time in New York State history, correction officers were criminally charged for a non-sexual assault of an inmate. The guards pleaded guilty in 2015 to a misdemeanor charge of misconduct in order to avoid prison time. In news stories regarding the incident, current and former inmates of Attica reported that the prison maintained a reputation as "a facility where a small group of correction officers dole out harsh punishment largely with impunity" and inmates conveyed numerous stories of poor conditions and severe treatment by guards. However, Pell Grants would be eventually be restored at the federal level in 2023 as a result of both the Consolidated Appropriations Act, 2021 and the Federal Student Aid (FAFSA) Simplification Act of 2022.

Interpreting the post-Attica reforms through the lens of counterinsurgency theory and practice, anthropologist Orisanmi Burton has argued that these temporary "improvements" to prison conditions were designed to fracture that organizing and activism taking place within prisons and to create a cleavage between the prison population's reformist and revolutionary/abolitionist elements.

== Books ==
Published in 1972, the first historical account of the Attica Prison Uprising was written by The New York State Special Commission on Attica and was entitled Attica: The Official Report.

Published in 1974, The Brothers of Attica is a first hand account written by a former Attica prisoner and Nation of Islam member named Richard X. Clark.

In 1975, Tom Wicker, a New York Times editor, who was present at the prison as an observer, published A Time to Die.

Another Attica observer, Clarence Jones, released (with Stuart Connelly) his historical account Uprising: Understanding Attica, Revolution and the Incarceration State in 2011.

In 1985, Malcolm Bell, a former prosecutor for the Attica Task Force and eventual whistleblower, released his account of the investigation and coverup The Turkey Shoot: Tracking the Attica Cover-up.

A detailed historical account of the uprising was published by historian Heather Ann Thompson in 2016. The book, entitled Blood in the Water, draws on interviews with former inmates, hostages, families of victims, law enforcement, lawyers, and state officials, as well as significant archives of previously unreleased materials.

Published in 2021, The Prison Guard's Daughter: My Journey Through the Ashes of Attica is a memoir by Deanne Quinn Miller (with Gary Craig), the daughter of the prison guard killed during the initial riot, William Quinn, and an organizer with The Forgotten Victims of Attica, a group made up of surviving hostages and families of prison employees who were killed.

In 2022, Joshua Melville, the son of Sam Melville, one of the inmates killed in the retaking of the prison, released American Time Bomb: Attica, Sam Melville, and a Son's Search for Answers. The memoir tells the story of the life of Sam Melville, the Attica Uprising, and the broader goals and controversies of the New Left movement.

In 2020, a non-fiction graphic novel entitled Big Black: Stand at Attica was published. It was co-written by Frank "Big Black" Smith, an inmate leader during the uprising. The book was included on the 2020 list of Top Ten Best Graphic Novels for Adults compiled by the Graphic Novels and Comics Round Table of the American Library Association.

In October 2023, Tip of the Spear: Black Radicalism, Prison Repression, and the Long Attica Revolt was published by the University of California Press. Drawing on previously untapped archival sources and oral history, anthropologist Orisanmi Burton focuses on the revolutionary, internationalist, and abolitionist dimensions of the Attica rebellion, which the author argues had been largely ignored by previous historical accounts. The book is especially critical of historian Heather Ann Thompson's account, arguing that because of its uncritical over-reliance on state-records and its failure to engage non-traditional sources produced and archived by the prisoners themselves, Blood in the Water produces a distorted image of Attica through the eyes of the state. Tip of the Spear also challenges the official chronology and geography of the Attica rebellion, arguing that the eruption that occurred in Attica on September 9, 1971, was the culmination of series of rebellions that had been erupting in various New York City jails and state prisons for a year prior to Attica. For this reason, Burton reframes the Attica riot as "The Long Attica Revolt." The book also shows that in response to the rebellion, prison management techniques began to incorporate elements of counterinsurgency theory and practice, as well as psychological warfare and behavior modification, and mind control experimentation. Tip of the Spear has received critical acclaim from outlets such as The Progressive, The Los Angeles Review of Books, Public Books, Verso, Medical Anthropology Quarterly, and Current Anthropology.

== In popular culture ==
Direct coverage of the Attica Prison rebellion:

- On September 9, 2021, the 50th anniversary of the beginning of the uprising, the documentary Attica premiered at the Toronto International Film Festival. In order for director Stanley Nelson "To tell the story of Attica, he conducts dozens of new interviews with prisoners, journalists, and other eyewitnesses. He makes powerful use of surveillance footage and the extensive news coverage that made Attica a national event." Produced by Firelight Films and Showtime Documentary Films, the film was released on Showtime in fall 2021.
- In preparation for the 50th anniversary of the Attica prison massacre in 2021, HBO Max released a documentary titled Betrayal at Attica on August 1, 2021. The plot is described as: "On September 13, 1971, the State of New York shot and killed 39 of its citizens, injured hundreds more, and tortured the survivors. The plan to retake D Yard led to one of the bloodiest days in American history and set the stage for the worst aspects of modern policing. Radical lawyer Elizabeth Fink tells the story of the Attica prison rebellion, and how she exposed the cover-up that went on for decades."
- In 2019 Icarus Films released Ghosts of Attica, a documentary directed by Brad Lichtenstein featuring extensive interviews with survivors of the uprising, including Frank "Big Black" Smith, who served as the inmate head of security during the uprising; Mike Smith, one of the hostages who was shot during the retaking; Elizabeth Fink, a lawyer who headed the lawsuits for the inmates; and several members of the observer's committee, including Tom Wicker, Congressman Herman Badillo, Assemblyman Arthur Eve, and William Kunstler.
- As part of a 40th-anniversary commemoration, filmmakers Chris Christopher and David Marshall, in association with Blue Sky Project, produced a 60-minute, Emmy-nominated documentary called Criminal Injustice: Death and Politics at Attica, first aired on PBS in 2012, which brings together a range of previously unavailable interviewees who deconstruct and expose many myths and misconceptions about the Attica Prison rebellion, its causes, and its coverup.
- ScreenSlate describes Cinda Firestone's documentary, titled Attica (1974), as follows: "Firestone's 1974 film, restored in 2007, culls together primary footage from surveillance and news cameras along with prisoner, family, and guard interviews to create an account of the massacre that has been described as temperate, but undeniably damning concerning the state's actions.
- At least three fictionalized TV movies of the rebellion have been produced: Attica (1980) directed by Marvin J. Chomsky, with George Grizzard and Morgan Freeman; John Frankenheimer's Against the Wall (1994), with Samuel L. Jackson, Kyle MacLachlan, and Clarence Williams III; and The Killing Yard (2001), directed by Euzhan Palcy, with Alan Alda and Morris Chestnut.

Notable references to the Attica Prison rebellion:

- In the 1975 Sidney Lumet-directed film Dog Day Afternoon, Al Pacino's character shouts "Attica! Attica!" to the reporters and policemen gathered outside during his hostage crisis. The line was placed at number eighty-six on 100 Years...100 Movie Quotes. Two years later in 1977, John Travolta's character of Tony Manero would quote Pacino's Attica chant in the movie Saturday Night Fever.

=== Music ===
The incident is directly referenced in several songs and the name of a band:

- The album Attica Blues (1972) by Archie Shepp, and especially its title song, is dedicated to the riots.
- The song "Rubber Bullets" (1973) by British band 10cc.
- The song "Attica State" (1972) by English singer-songwriter John Lennon.
- The song "Attica Part 1" (1972) By Caribbean Folk singer Exuma.
- The song "The Hostage" (1972) by American folk musician Tom Paxton.
- The composition “Attica” (1973) by fredric rzewski.
- The song "Remember Rockefeller at Attica" (1975) by jazz musician Charles Mingus, included in his album Changes One.
- The song "Hardcore Rap Act" (1995) by Brooklyn-based hip hop duo Das EFX.
- The song "If I Ruled the World (Imagine That)" (1996) by rapper Nas.

=== Poetry ===
- Boxer Muhammad Ali recited a poem during an interview on RTÉ on a visit to Ireland in July 1972, imagining what Attica's prisoners would have said before their death.
- In 1972, avant-garde composer and pianist Frederic Rzewski wrote two pieces connected to the Attica uprising, both for percussion ensemble and speaker. "Coming Together" sets a text by Sam Melville, a leader of the uprising and one of the people who lost their lives as a result of it, from a letter he wrote in 1971. The second and shorter piece, "Attica", is set to the statement made by inmate Richard X. Clark when he was released from the prison: "Attica is in front of me now." The two pieces were recorded in 1973 for the Opus One label by the Blackearth Percussion Group, with Steven ben Israel of the Living Theater as the speaker.

=== Television ===
- A TV movie named Attica dramatized the riot, airing on March 2, 1980.
- In the season 1 finale of Oz "A Game of Checkers", Tim McManus reveals to Said that he grew up in Attica and was a child when the riots occurred days before his birthday, with McManus hoping to prevent the deaths of the inmates and correctional officers during the Emerald City riot.
- In the final episode of Orange Is the New Black season 4, the prisoners rise and chant "Attica! Attica!". The entirety of season 5 is devoted to the rebellion itself, which contains significant parallels to the Attica uprising.
- The Attica Prison uprising served as a source of inspiration for the Bell Riots in the Star Trek: Deep Space Nine episode "Past Tense".

== See also ==
- List of notable prison riots
- Inmates of Attica Correctional Facility v. Rockefeller
- Walpole prison strike
