= Edmund A. Chester =

American television executive

- Born: Edmund Albert Chester; June 22, 1897
- Died: October 14, 1973 (aged 76)
- Occupations: Television executive Journalist
- Known for: La Cadena de las Américas (Network of the Americas)
- Awards: Carlos Manuel de Céspedes National Order of Merit of Cuba

Edmund Albert Chester Sr. (June 22, 1897 – October 14, 1973) was an American television executive and journalist. He served as a vice president and executive at the CBS radio and television networks during the 1940s. As Director of Latin American Relations he collaborated with the Department of State to develop CBS's La Cadena de las Américas radio network in support of Pan-Americanism during World War II. He also served as a highly respected journalist and Bureau Chief for Latin America at Associated Press and Vice President at La Prensa Asociada in the 1930s. He was awarded the Carlos Manuel de Céspedes National Order of Merit by the government of Cuba in recognition of his efforts to foster greater understanding between the peoples of Cuba and the United States of America.

== Biography ==
During the course of a journalistic career which ranged over two decades, he assumed a central role in the development of a viable international radio transmission network linking the United States with the developing nations of South America and Central America for the CBS network from 1940 through 1949. As Director of Short Wave Broadcasts for CBS he supervised the creation of this vast shortwave service which was widely known throughout South America as the Network of the Americas (La Cadena de las Américas).

=== Associated Press ===
Prior to accepting William S. Paley's invitation to join the CBS network, Edmund Chester served as a journalist in Latin America for the Associated Press for twenty years. He first joined the Associated Press in 1930 in Louisville, Kentucky after leaving his position at the Louisville Courier-Journal. During this time he reported on several historic events including: the Lima Pan American Conference in 1938, the catastrophic earthquake in Chile during 1939 and the Havana Pan American Conference in 1940. In later years he emerged as the executive director for Associated Press' Latin America Department and Vice President of Associated Press' Latin American subsidiary La Presnes Asociada.

=== CBS network ===
After joining CBS in 1940, Chester assumed the post of Vice President of the Columbia Broadcasting System and assisted William S. Paley, Paul White and high level diplomats from South America in the development of the intricate broadcast standards which would serve as the foundations for this vital information link during the turbulent World War II era. He also collaborated with his counterparts in Europe during the post World War II era in order to coordinate the creation of new technical broadcast standards and the expansion of the broadcast network which linked the two continents.

External images
- Photograph of Edmund Chester -Director of CBS La Cadena de las Américas network in 1943; Here on Getty images
- Photograph of Edmund Chester, Edward R. Murrow, Eric Sevareid on "Challenge of the 50s: Years of Crisis" in 1951; Here on Getty Images

His endeavors were not limited to the technical development of CBS's worldwide broadcasting capabilities. As CBS's Director of Latin American Relations Mr. Chester worked in concert with the Department of State, the United States Office of the Coordinator of Inter-American Affairs (OCIAA) and Voice of America while supervising the development of news and cultural programming for live broadcasts to North America and Latin America from the CBS broadcast studios in New York City. These imaginative cultural initiatives served to foster benevolent diplomatic relations and high level cultural exchanges throughout South America as part of President Franklin Roosevelt's support for Pan-Americanism and cultural diplomacy during the 1940s. Popular programs such as Viva América showcased professional musical talent of the highest caliber in live concert while preserving cultural authenticity and were supervised by the Department of State and the Office of Inter-American Affairs during the tenure of Nelson Rockefeller.

Chester presented prominent musicians from both North America and South America for extended appearances on these broadcasts. Included among these performing artists were Alfredo Antonini (American (orchestral conductor)); Juan Arvizu Mexican "Tenor with the Silken Voice"); Nestor Mesta Chayres (Mexican tenor aka "El Gitano De Mexico"); Eva Garza (Mexican songstress); Terig Tucci (Argentine composer/arranger); John Serry Sr. (American concert accordionist/composer), Elsa Miranda (Puerto Rican vocalist), the Los Panchos Trio, Manuolita Arriola (1946) and members of the CBS Pan American Orchestra. By recruiting some of the best entertainment talent from throughout the hemisphere, Chester hoped to present an image of the American people as soulful romantics rather than mere "cogs in the national industrial machine", while also providing accurate and timely news programming.

As World War II evolved, the shortwave broadcasts which were transmitted over Chester's La Cadena de las Américas grew in popularity and scope throughout Latin America. Initially broadcasts only lasted for seven hours each day. By 1945, Chester successfully developed the network to broadcast high-quality entertainment and news programming over 114 affiliated radio stations in twenty Latin American nations.

In 1945, Chester also emerged as a Producer for the CBS broadcast of "Program of the Three Americas" which showcased the music of such noted American composers as: Irving Berlin, Jerome Kern and Richard Rodgers on the La Cadena de las Américas network. The broadcast illustrated Chester's collaboration with Alfredo Antonini (Conductor), Wendell Adams (Director) and Harry Kramer (Commentator).

External image
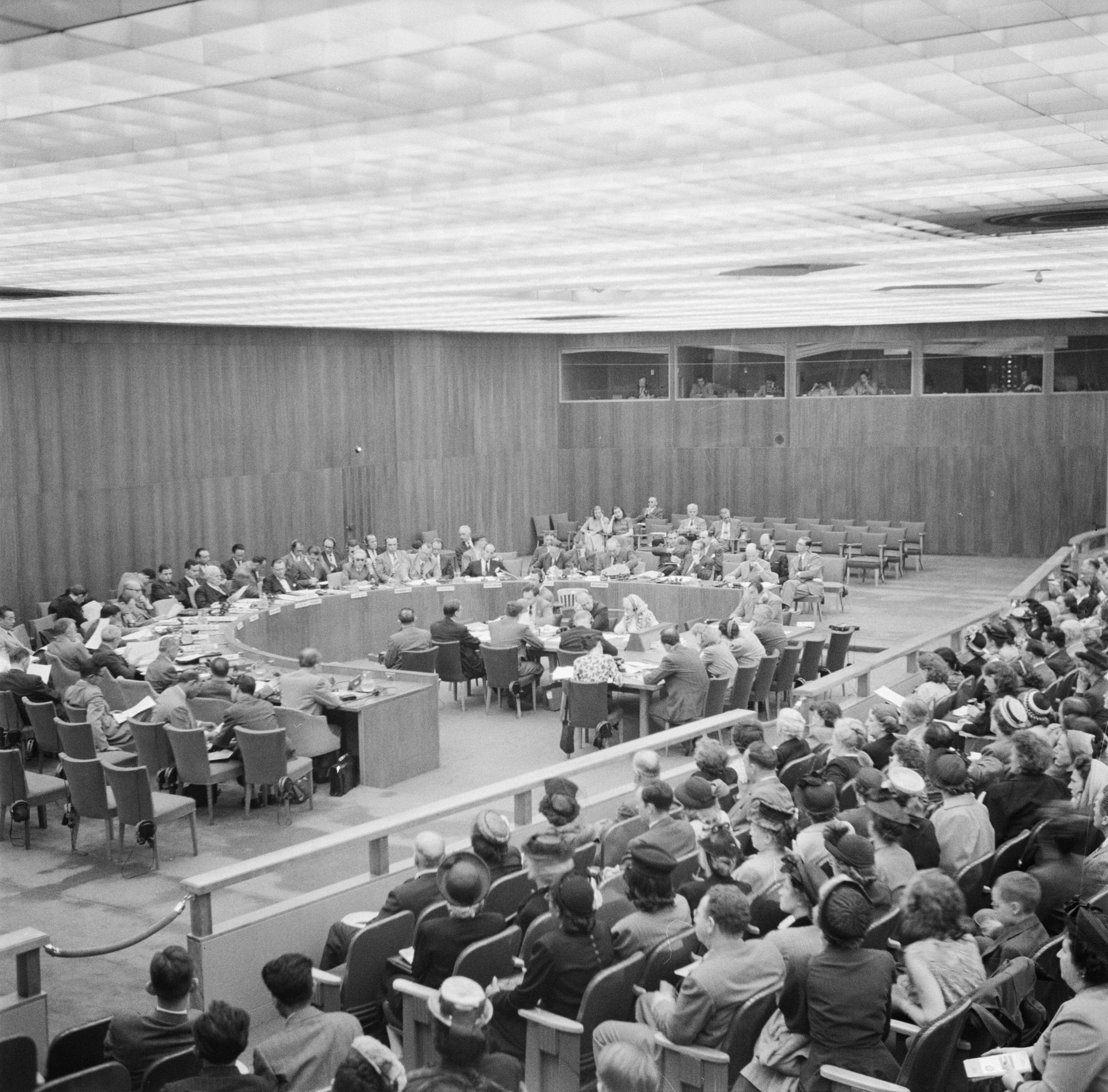
- "United Nations in Action" – CBS Television – Edmund Chester in 1949; Here on Getty images UN session in June 1948

In later years, Mr. Chester emerged as the director of news, special events and sports for the CBS Television Network (1948). During this period he assumed a central role in coordinating the integration of the vast CBS radio network with the evolving television division.

In 1949, Chester also collaborated with one of the original Murrow Boys Larry LeSueur, the media advisor Lyman Bryson and Benjamin V. Cohen (United Nations Assistant Secretary General) in another journalistic endeavor for CBS. In the course of supervising historic live television coverage of the proceedings of the United Nations General Assembly and the United Nations Security Council from Lake Success, New York on the broadcast series "United Nations in Action" in November 1949, Mr. Chester demonstrated a commitment to the professional standards for excellence in broadcasting which served as the hallmark of the entire CBS network for decades to come. The series of broadcasts was honored with the George Foster Peabody Award for Television News in 1949.

As a new decade began, Chester collaborated once again with leading journalists at CBS Radio including: Edward R. Murrow and Eric Sevareid in a discussion of the major news developments of the year on the broadcast "Challenge of the 50's Years of Crisis" in 1951.

=== Politics ===
Following his retirement from CBS in 1952, Chester served as a consultant on economic and foreign affairs to his friend Fulgencio Batista in Cuba. Earlier in 1938, he reported on Batista's proclaimed vision for the preservation of democracy in Cuba. Subsequently, in 1954, Chester completed a more comprehensive biography which outlined Batista's rise from a sergeant in the army to the leadership of the Cuban government. Following Fidel Castro's successful rise to power in 1959, Batista's military dictatorship of 1952–1959 collapsed, and Edmund Chester joined the ranks of thousands of other American citizens and companies whose investments on the island were abruptly seized by Cuba's new Ministry of Ill-Gotten Goods.

== Death ==
Edmund Chester died at the age of 75 on October 14, 1973, in Mount Dora, Florida. He was survived by his wife Enna and their four children.

== Works ==
- A Sergeant Named Batista (New York: Henry Holt & Company, 1954)

== Awards ==
In recognition of his efforts to foster better relations between the peoples of Cuba and the United States of America, Chester was awarded the Order of Carlos Manuel de Céspedes (1943) by the government of Cuba – its highest civilian honor.

== Archive ==
- Edmund Albert Chester's papers, photographs and correspondence relating to Latin American politics and CBS radio broadcasting in Latin America are archived at Online Archive of California.
