= Radio programming =

Broadcast programming of a radio format

Radio programming is the process of organising a schedule of radio content for commercial broadcasting and public broadcasting by radio stations.

== History ==
The original inventors of radio, from Guglielmo Marconi's time on, expected it to be used for one-on-one Wireless communication tasks where telephones and telegraphs could not be used because of the problems involved in stringing copper wires from one point to another, such as in ship-to-shore communications. Those inventors had no expectations whatever that radio would become a major mass media entertainment and information medium earning many millions of dollars in revenues annually through radio advertising commercials or sponsorship. These latter uses were brought about after 1920 by business entrepreneurs such as David Sarnoff, who created the National Broadcasting Company (NBC), and William S. Paley, who built Columbia Broadcasting System (CBS). These broadcasting (as opposed to narrowcasting) business organizations began to be called network affiliates, because they consisted of loose chains of individual stations located in various cities, all transmitting the standard overall-system supplied fare, often at synchronised agreed-upon times. Some of these radio network stations were owned and operated by the networks, while others were independent radio owned by entrepreneurs allied with the respective networks. By selling blocks of time to advertisers, the medium was able to quickly become profitable and offer its products to listeners for free, provided they invested in a radio receiver set.

The new medium had grown rapidly through the 1930s, vastly increasing both the size of its audience and its profits. In those early days, it was customary for a corporation to sponsor an entire half-hour radio program, placing its commercials at the beginning and the end. This is in contrast to the pattern which developed late in the 20th century in both television and radio, where small slices of time were sold to many sponsors and no corporation claimed or wanted sponsorship of the entire show, except in rare cases. These later commercials also filled a much larger portion of the total program time than they had in the earlier days.

In the early radio age, content typically included a balance of comedy, drama, news, music and sports reporting. Variety radio programs included the most famous Hollywood talent of the day. During the 1920s, radio focused on musical entertainment. Radio soap operas began in the U.S. in 1930 with Painted Dreams. Lørdagsbarnetimen, a Norwegian children's show, with its premiere in 1924 interrupted only by the Second World War, was the longest running radio show in the world until it ceased production in 2010.

As World War II unfolded during the 1940s, radio also played a central role in utilizing soft power to support cultural diplomacy through a collaboration of the United States Department of State's Office of the Coordinator of Inter-American Affairs and CBS's La Cadena de las Americas network. This nonprofit collaboration resulted in programming which showcased the cultural heritage shared throughout the Americas and included informative news programs such as Calling Pan America and popular musical shows such as Viva America

In the early 1950s, television programming eroded the popularity of radio comedy, drama and variety shows. By the late 1950s, radio broadcasting took on much the form it has today – strongly focused on music, talk, news and sports, though drama can still be heard, especially on the BBC.

== See also ==
- Rotation (broadcast programming)
