= Eva Garza =

American singer

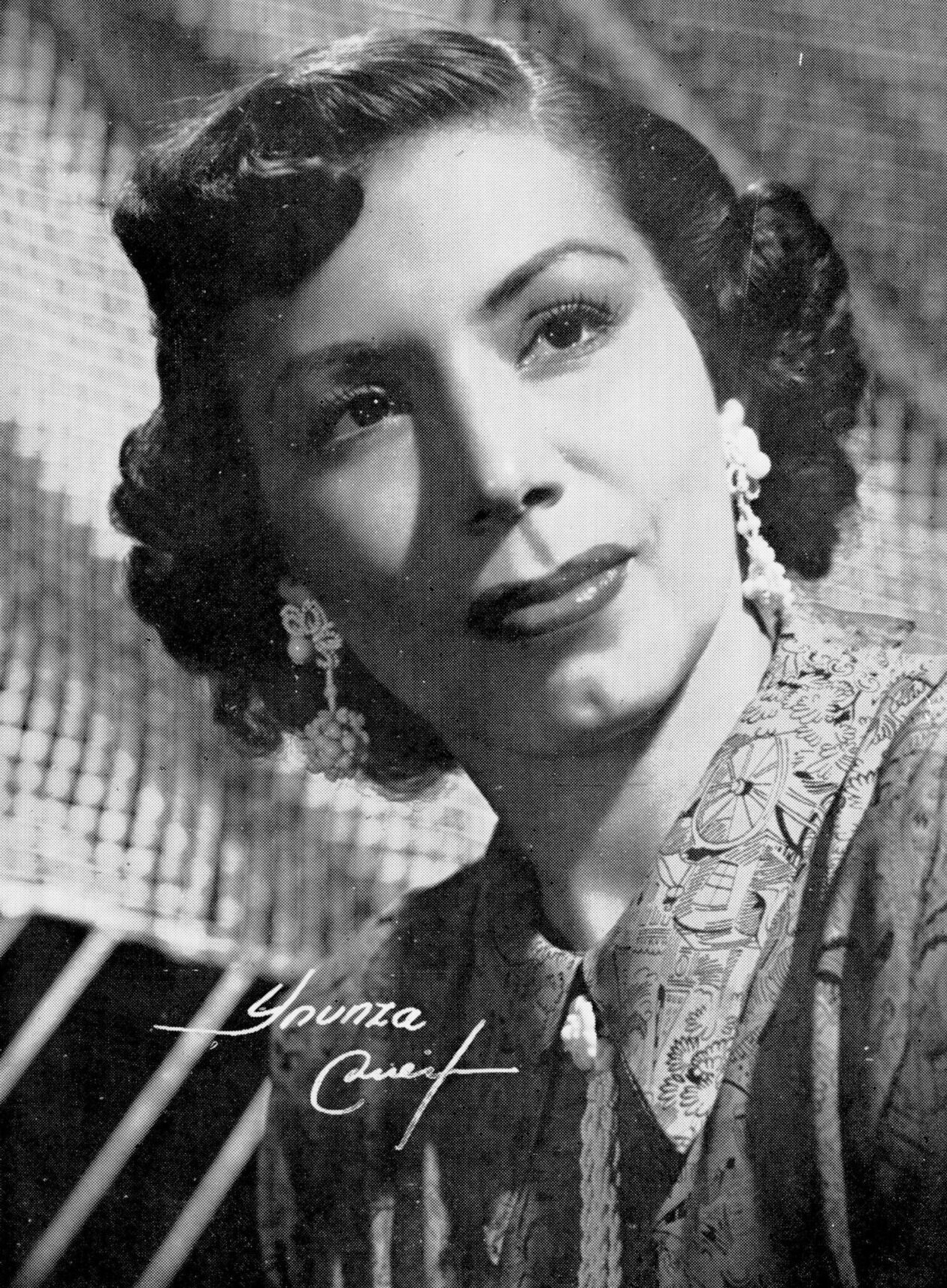
- Garza in 1954

Background information
- Born: 11 May 1917; San Antonio, Texas, United States
- Died: 1 November 1966 (aged 49) Tucson, Arizona, USA
- Occupations: Singer, actress
- Years active: 1935–1966 (film)

Eva Garza (May 11, 1917 – November 1, 1966) was a Mexican-American singer and film actress who acquired international recognition in the 1940s and 1950s during the Golden Age of Mexican cinema. She collaborated on live radio shows and films with some of the leading performers of her time, including Mexico's Agustín Lara. She was nicknamed "Sweetheart of the Americas".

== Biography ==
Eva Garza was the third oldest child of seven children raised by Cenobia B. Ramírez and Procopio V. Garza. Her father was the owner of a local barber shop. Eva's first exposure to public performances of music took place at church functions, local parties and over the local radio station. Subsequently, she entered several amateur competitions in San Antonio and was awarded several prizes. By 1932 she embarked upon a series of performances on KABC radio which lasted for several years. She also performed in the popular radio show La Hoira Anahuac as well as in various vaudeville acts at the Nacional Theatre with Netty y Jesús and Don Sauve.Her early recordings of rhumbas and boleros with Bluebird Records also date from this time and include performances of: La Jaibera, Calientito, Cosquillas, Cachita and Qué Me Importa in 1936.

After touring as the voice of the fan dancer Sally Rand in New York in 1937, Garza returned to Texas in 1938 and formed her own group billed as "Eva Garza and Her Troupe". During a three-year period between 1939 and 1942 she toured throughout Central and South America. While performing on the radio in Juarez, Mexico she met her future husband Felipe Bojalil Gil of the ensemble El Charro Gil y Sus Caporales. The couple was married in 1939 in San Antonio and eventually raised three children.

After settling in New York City, Eva and her husband Felipe "El Charro" Gil recorded the bolero Diez Años by Rafael Hernandez for Columbia Records. Performances on the Columbia Broadcasting System soon followed in 1941. Garza began to appear regularly at CBS and for Voice of America on the Viva America program in collaboration with such leading performing artists as: Alfredo Antonini, Terig Tucci, Juan Arvizu, Nestor Mesta Chayres, Miguel Sandoval and John Serry Sr. By 1945, her broadcasts on CBS's La Cadena de las Americas network were heard by audiences in twenty Latin American nations and by members of America's armed forces in Europe through the Armed Forces Radio Services Garza's performances on the program earned her the nickname "Sweetheart of the Americas".

In 1952, Garza moved to Mexico City along with her daughters Felicia (then known as Felipe Gil, Jr.) and Corina to initiate performances with Radio XEW while collaborating with such leading performers as: Pedro Infante, Pedro Vargas, Javier Solis and Jorge Negrete. While in Mexico she appeared in over 20 films with such leading actors as Toña la Negra (Amor Vendido, 1951), Sara Montiel (Carcel de Mujeres, 1951) and Luis Arcaraz (Acapulco, 1952).

During the 1950s Garza also received contracts to perform in nightclubs throughout Latin America in such countries as: Argentina, Brazil, Cuba, Ecuador and Colombia and Mexico. During her visits to Cuba she appeared in such prominent cabarets as Tropicana and Teatro Americano as well as on the popular television program Duelo de Pianos with Agustín Lara and Consuelo Velázquez. She also performed on Havana's Radio Cadena Suaritos with the Cuban pianist Isolina Carrillo.

While residing in Mexico, Garza recorded boleros written by such noted composers as: Agustín Lara, Gonzalo Curiél, and Joaquin Pardave for Columbia Records, Musart Records and Seeco Records. Included among her most outstanding recordings from this time are: Sin Motivo, Frio en el Alma and La Ultima Noche.

In 1965 Garza married the Argentine artist Abel Reynoso after divorcing her first husband in 1953. She joined Reynoso in Buenos Aires and was subsequently lured back to Mexico by Columbia Records to record a retrospective album of some of her greatest hits: Vuelve Eva Garza- Mexican Encore. She subsequently resumed a concert tour of Arizona, New Mexico and Los Angeles California.

Eva Garza recorded over 200 single recordings for such major record labels as Columbia Records, Seeco Records and Musart Records over the course of her career. Her discography includes recordings of such popular boleros as: Celosa, Cantando and Arrepentido. Critical reviewers in The Billboard took note of her warm, and expressive style of interpretation. She was also cited for a deep, warm, rich and persuasive interpretations and was the recipient of three María Grever Awards for Best Singer of the Year. Hailed as one of the ten best singers in Mexico, Eva Garza is remembered as a versatile vocalist who was equally comfortable singing romantic boleros, corridos, tropical music and contemporary songs with ease.

== Death ==
During the course of a concert tour of the Southwest, Garza developed pneumonia and did not recover. She died at the age 49 in Tucson, Arizona. In accordance with her wishes, she was laid to rest in Mexico City.

== Selected discography ==
Eva Garza recorded over 150 single titles including:

- Arrpentido - Decca Records (Catalogue # 1041 8B) - Eva Garza sings this tango by Francisco Lomuto with orchestra (19??)
- Beso Mortal - Seeco Records (Catalogue # 7046B) - Eva Garza sings this bolero by Eva Garza and Felipe Gil with La Orquesta de Ray Montoya (19??)
- Cachita - Bluebird Records (Catalogue # B-2947-A) - Eva Garza sings this rumba by Rafael Hernandez (19??)
- Calientito - Bluebird Records (Calatogue # B-2911-B) - Eva Garza sings this rumba with orchestra (19??)
- Cantando - Columbia Records (Catalogue # EX-5189)- Eva Garza sings this bolero by M. Simone (19??)
- Celosa - Columbia Records (Catalogue # EPC-528-A-2)- Eva Garza sings this bolero by P. Rodriguez (19??)
- Cosquillas - Bluebird Records (Catalogue # B-2947-B) - Eva Garza sings this rumba with orchestra (19??)
- Diez Años - Columbia Records (Catalogue # 6916-X) - Eva Garza sings this Bolero by Rafael Hernandez with El Charro Gil y Sus Caporales (19??)
- Eso Si Eso No - Columbia Records (Catalogue # 1613C) - Eva Garza sings this cornado by Charro Gil with El Charro Gil y Sus Caporales (19??)
- Frio En El Alma - Seeco Records (Catalogue # 609A) - Eva Garza sings a bolero by Miguel Angel Valladares with Lazaro Quintero Orchestra (19??)
- Inutil Es Fingir - Seeco Records (Catalogue # 658A) Eva Garza sings this bolero by Carlos Gomez with Roberto Ondina y La Orquesta Suaritos (19??)
- La Jaibera - Bluebird Records (Catalogue # B-2911-A) - Eva Garza dings this rumba with orchestra (19??)
- La Ultima Noche - Columbia Records (Catalogue # 6214-X) - Eva Garza sings this bolero by Bob Collazo with the Columbia Orchestra (19??)
- Que Me Importa - Bluebird Records (Catalogue # B-2926-A) - Eva Garza sings this bolero with orchestra (19??)
- Sabor De Engaño - Columbia Records (Catalogue # 6205-X) - Eva Garza sings this bolero by Mario Alvarez with Bill Gale and Orquesta de Salon Columbia (19??)
- Sera Por Eso - Seeco Records (Catalogue # 609 B) Eva Garza sings this bolero by Consuelo Velazquez with the Lazaro Qunitero Orchestra (19??)
- Sin Motivo - Columbia Records (Catalogue # 6207-X)- Eva Garza sings this bolero by Gabriel Ruiz with La Orquesta de Salon Columbia (19??)
- Sombras - Seeco Records (Catalogue # 658B) - Eva Garza sings this bolero by Agustín Lara with Roberto Ondina y La Orquesta Suaritos (19??)
- Tiempo Perdido - Seeco Records (Catalogue # 7102 B) - Eva Garza sings this bolero by Eduardo Lazo with La Orquesta de Juan Britto Tarraza (19??)
- Usted - Seeco Records (Catalogue # 7102 A) - Eva Garza sings this bolero by Gabriel Ruiz with La Orquesta de Juan Brito Tarraza (19??)

== Selected filmography ==
- Si Fuera una Cualquiera (1950)
- Women's Prison (1951)
- Women Without Tomorrow (1951)
- Arrabalera (1951)
- Love for Sale (1951)
- Acapulco (1952)
- Paco the Elegant (1952)
- Women Who Work (1953)
- Bolero Inmortal (1958)
- Pistolos de Oro (1959)

== Bibliography ==
- Deborah R. Vargas. Dissonant Divas in Chicana Music: The Limits of la Onda. University of Minnesota Press, 2012.
- "Modern Spanglish: A Chat With Carrie Rodriguez," Texas Monthly, January 2016, https://www.texasmonthly.com/the-culture/interview-carrie-rodriguez/
