= Alfredo Antonini =

Italian-American conductor (1901–1983)

- Born: Alfredo Antonini; May 31, 1901; Alessandria, Kingdom of ItalyItaly
- Died: November 3, 1983 (aged 82)
- Occupations: Conductor, Composer, Musical Director
- Years active: 1921–1977
- Spouse: Alexandra Catherine Pasimeni (m. 1948)
- Awards: Emmy Award; Order of Merit of the Italian Republic

Alfredo Antonini (May 31, 1901 – November 3, 1983) was a leading Italian-American symphony conductor and composer who was active on the international concert stage as well as on the CBS radio and television networks from the 1930s through the early 1970s. In 1972 he received an Emmy Award for Outstanding Achievement in Religious Programming on television for his conducting of the premiere of Ezra Laderman's opera And David Wept for CBS television during 1971. In addition, he was awarded the Order of Merit of the Italian Republic in 1980.

== Biography ==
Antonini was born in Alessandria and pursued his musical studies at the Royal Conservatory in Milan. He was a student of the Italian conductor Arturo Toscanini, whom he first met at the age of thirteen while performing on the celesta in the Italian premier of Igor Stravinsky's Petrouchka. He distinguished himself as both an organist and pianist with La Scala Orchestra in Milan prior to emigrating to the United States in 1929. His musical talents were shared by his father who served as a member of the Buenos Aires Opera company at the Teatro Colón after leaving Italy for Argentina. In addition, his wife Sandra was a both a piano accompanist and voice teacher.

=== Early career ===
Upon his arrival in America, Antonini emerged as an accompanist on the piano for the operatic tenor Edoardo Ferrari-Fontana. During the late 1920s he also served as the musical director of the Fifth Avenue Playhouse Group of cinemas, which showcased foreign films from Europe for American audiences. For three years, Antonini composed and arranged musical scores for various productions which originated in both Sweden and Russia while also serving as the musical director at the Little Carnegie Playhouse. During this time he also conducted his own orchestral ensemble each week on the radio for WHN. Years later in 1939, he hosted a weekly program in collaboration with Harry Kramer on the Mutual Broadcasting System radio network which featured his Alfredo Antonini Orchestra in performances of both classical and popular songs of the era.

During the 1940s, he distinguished himself as a conductor of several leading orchestras while performing on CBS Radio. These included: the CBS Pan American Orchestra (1940–1949), as part of the cultural diplomacy initiative of the Department of State and the Office of the Coordinator of Inter-American Affairs during World War II, the Columbia Concert Orchestra (1940–1949) and the CBS Symphony Orchestra. During the 1940s Antonini also led the CBS Symphony Orchestra in several recordings for the Voice of America broadcasting service.

His performances with the CBS Pan American Orchestra were noteworthy for helping to introduce Latin American music and the Mexican bolero to large audiences in the United States.

=== The 1940s: Radio ===
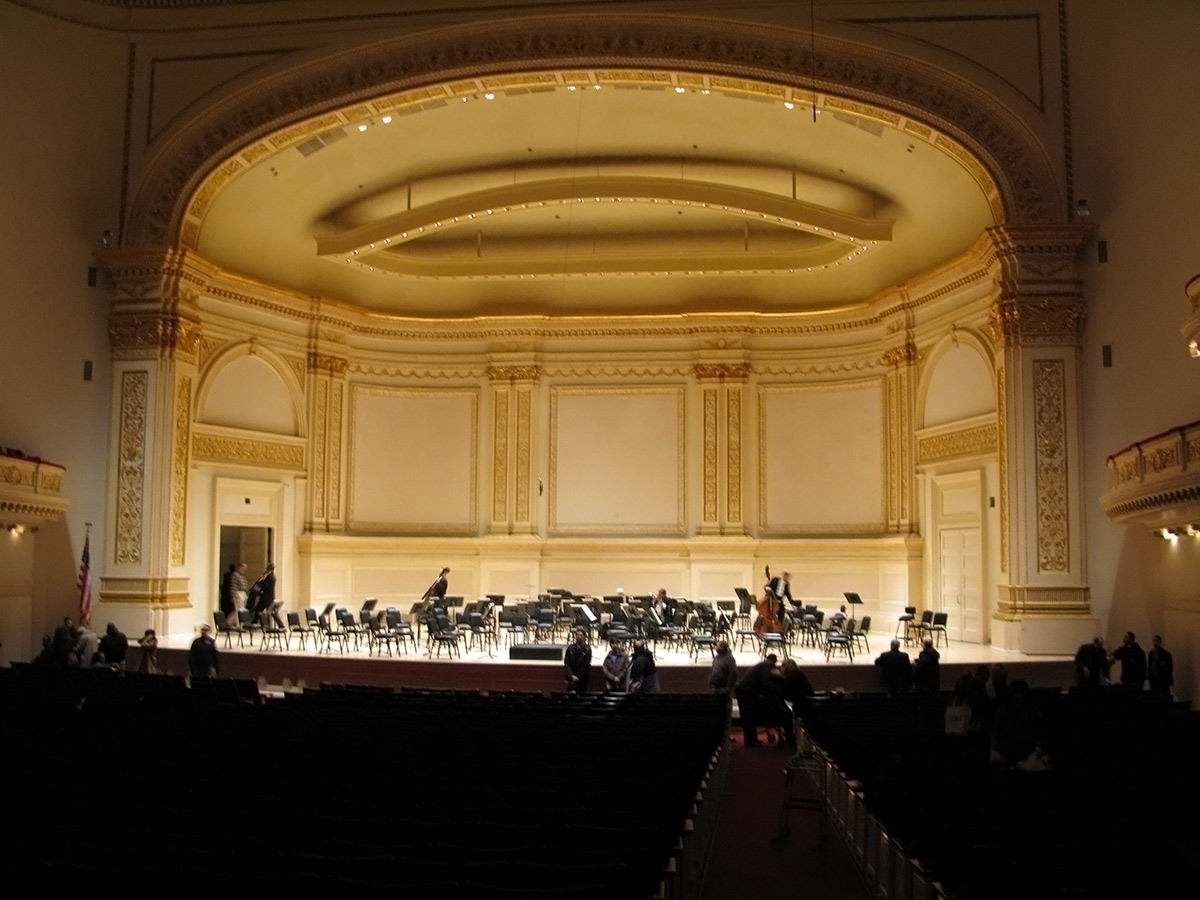
Carnegie Hall

During the 1940s Antonini conducted live radio broadcasts of the program Viva America on the CBS Radio and La Cadena de las Americas (Network of the Americas) in collaboration with several international artists including: Nestor Mesta Chayres (aka "El Gitano De Mexico"), Terig Tucci, Juan Arvizu (aka "El Troubador de las Americas"), Elsa Miranda , Eva Garza, Kate Smith, Pat O'Brien, and John Serry. He also appeared with Chayres and the New York Philharmonic in the Night of the Americas Concert series at Carnegie Hall, which, according to The New York Times, was eagerly anticipated by the general public. Additional performances in collaboration with Arvizu and the CBS Tipica Orchestra for the Inter-America Music Fiesta at Carnegie Hall also attracted widespread acclaim.

In 1946, Antonini recorded several popular Latin American songs on the album Latin American Music – Alfredo Antonini and Viva America Orchestra for Alpha Records (catalogue #'s 12205A, 12205B, 12206A, 12206B) including: Tres Palabras (Osvaldo Farres), Caminito de Tu Casa (Julio Alberto Hernández), Chapinita (Miguel Sandoval) and Noche De Ronda (Augustin Lara). Critical review of the albums in The New Records praised his conducting talents and hailed the collection as among the best new albums of Latin American music.

External image
- Photograph of Alfredo Antonini conductor CBS Pan American Orchestra on "Viva America" for CBS Radio in 1946; Here on Getty images

Later in the 1940s, Antonini collaborated with vocalist Victoria Cordova in a series of recordings for Muzak, featuring compositions familiar to audiences in both North and South America. Included among these were: What a Difference a Day Made – Maria Grever, You Belong to My Heart – Agustin Lara, Siboney – Ernesto Lecuona, Amor – Gabriel Ruiz, Say It Isn't So – Irving Berlin, How Deep is the Ocean – Irving Berlin and A Perfect Day – Carrie Jacobs-Bond. He also collaborated with the Latin group Los Panchos Trio in a recording of the Chilean cueca dance La Palma for Pilotone records (#P45-5067). In addition, he recorded several songs for Columbia records with operatic baritone Carlo Morelli which included "La spagnola" (#17192-D), Alma Mia (#17192-D) Canta Il Mare (#17263-D), Si Alguna Vez (#17263-D). Additional collaborators included: Nino Martini for a recording of the song Amapola (Columbia, #17202-D) and Nestor Chayres for a recording of Granada (Decca, #23770 A).

At the close of the decade in 1948, Antonini also appeared as the conductor in the premier program of the CBS Symphony Summer Series which was broadcast live over the CBS Radio network. During this time he also collaborated with leading orchestral musicians including Julius Baker, and Mitch Miller. Several of his performances with the CBS Symphony Orchestra were also broadcast over the Voice of America network in 1948 and 1949. In addition, his recordings with the operatic vocalists Juan Arvizu and Nestor Mesta Chayres were transcribed during this time for broadcast by the Armed Forces Radio Network.

=== The 1950s: Opera ===
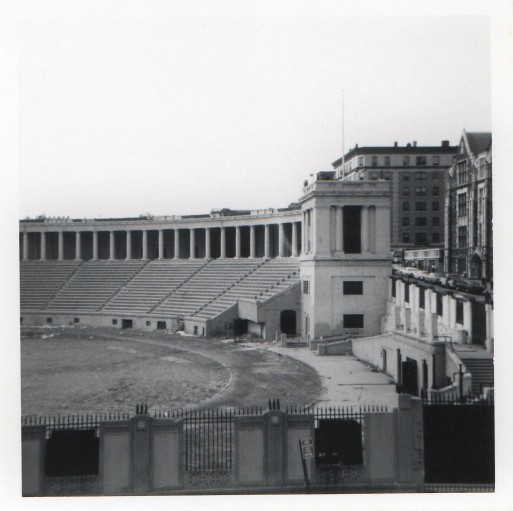
City College of New York – Lewisohn Stadium, New York City (1973)

During the 1950s, Antonini was a professor of music at St. John's University, located in Brooklyn, New York. He taught the Music Appreciation course. As a musical director for CBS Television during the 1950s, he was instrumental in presenting a program of classical and operatic music to the general public. His collaboration with Julie Andrews, Richard Rodgers, and Oscar Hammerstein II in a production of Cinderella for CBS television was telecast live in color on 31 March 1957 to an audience of 107 million. During this decade, he also appeared with several noted operatic sopranos including: Eileen Farrell and Beverly Sills. Later in 1957, he became the musical director/conductor of the Tampa Philharmonic Orchestra.

In 1951 he also served as both the orchestra leader and the Choral leader for the CBS Radio program Music Land U.S.A which featured talented vocalists. Included on the broadcast were Lois Hunt, Earl Wrightson and Thomas Hayward. These performances by the Alfredo Antonini Orchestra were included among several transcriptions of Antonini's work which were selected for broadcast to America's armed forces throughout the world by the Armed Forces Radio Network Service during the 1940's and 1950's.

Antonini served as a conductor of the open-air summer concerts held at the landmark Lewisohn Stadium in New York City during the 1940s, 1950s and 1960s. He appeared at least once during each season while featuring leading talent from the Metropolitan Opera. His appearances with the New York Philharmonic Symphony Orchestra and the Lewisohn Stadium Orchestra during the series of Italian Night concerts frequently attracted audiences which exceeded 13,000 guests. These performances featured arias from the standard Italian operatic repertoire and showcased such operatic luminaries as: Jan Peerce, Eileen Farrell, Richard Tucker, Beverly Sills, Licia Albanese, Eva Likova, Robert Weede, Cloe Elmo and Robert Merrill.

=== 1950s-1970s: Television ===
External audio
- You may listen to Alfredo Antonini conducting the New York Philharmonic, Licia Albanese, and Richard Tucker performing operatic arias by Giacomo Puccini in 1959 here

Antonini’s work with CBS soon led to television work as that medium came to prominence in the 1950s. He composed half the scores and led the CBS Orchestra in performances for the popular documentary series, The Twentieth Century (1957–66). He conducted the CBS Orchestra on the American Musical Theater documentary series (1959) which also featured Robert Weede and Laurel Hurley. Other early network credits included the long-running ecumenical religious program, Lamp Unto My Feet, and specials such as Cinderella and The Fabulous Fifties.

Antonini continued to collaborate as a guest conductor with instrumental soloists, including Benny Goodman in 1960 for a performance of Mozart's Clarinet Concerto at Lewisohn Stadium. In addition, he conducted the Symphony of the Air in the live prime-time television special Spring Festival of Music for CBS Television. This collaboration with the pianist John Browning and the producer Robert Herridge showcased a performance of a movement from Sergie Rachmaninoff's Second Piano Concerto. The performance was noted for its musical excellence as well as its dramatic visual presentation on television.

In 1962, Antonini collaborated with First Lady of the United States Jacqueline Kennedy, director Franklin J. Schaffner, and journalist Charles Collingwood of CBS News for the groundbreaking television documentary A Tour of the White House with Mrs. John F. Kennedy. The documentary television program was watched by more than 80 million viewers throughout the world and received wide critical acclaim. Soon thereafter in 1963, he received a special citation from ASCAP in recognition of his distinguished service to the development of music in America.

In 1964, Antonini appeared as conductor of the CBS Symphony Orchestra in an acclaimed adaptation of Hector Berlioz's sacred oratorio L'enfance du Christ for CBS Television. His operatic soloists included: Sherrill Milnes, Giorgio Tozzi, Ara Berberian, and Charles Anthony as supported by the choral voices of the Camerata Singers. At this time, he collaborated as conductor for a televised episode of The CBS Repertoire Workshop, "Feliz Borinquen", which showcased the talents of such leading Puerto Rican-American performers as: Martina Arroyo and Raul Davila.

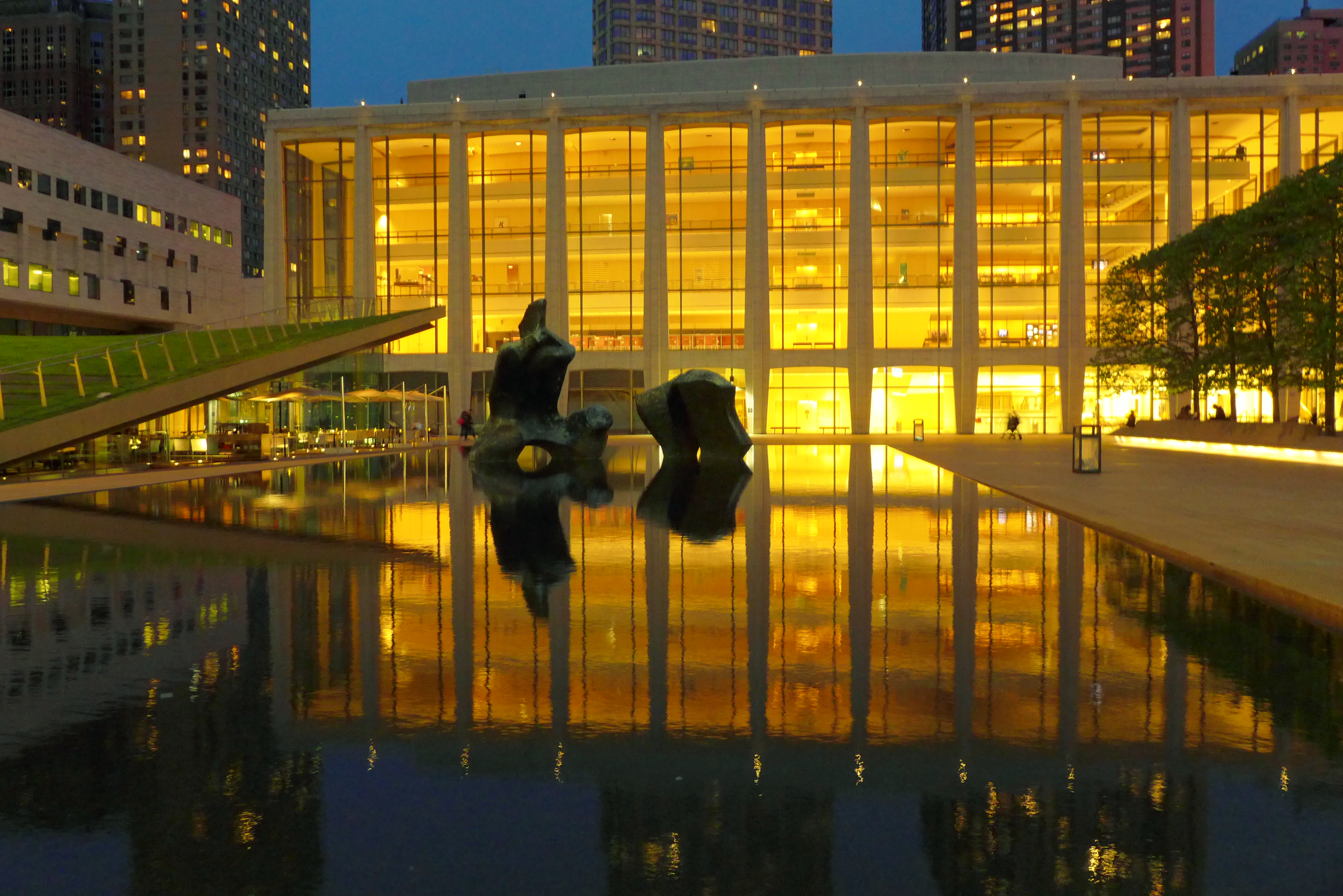
Philharmonic Hall – Lincoln Center Avery Fisher Hall with Henry Moore sculpture

In addition to performing as a conductor on WOR radio in New York City during the 1940s, he appeared as a guest conductor for leading symphonic orchestras in Chicago, Milwaukee, Oslo, Norway and Chile during the 1950s. During this time he also founded the Tampa Philharmonic Orchestra in Tampa, Florida, which eventually merged into the Florida Gulf Coast Symphony. In the 1960s, Antonini also appeared as a guest conductor with the New York Philharmonic at Philharmonic Hall during a grand opera benefit concert which featured the artistry of Jan Peerce and Robert Merrill. Throughout the 1960s he continued to collaborate with such operatic luminaries as Jan Peerce, Robert Merrill, Franco Corelli, Nicolai Gedda, Giorgio Tozzi, Gabriella Tucci, and Dorothy Kirsten in a variety of gala concerts. He also performed with Roberta Peters at the Lewisohn Stadium at City College.

In 1975, Antonini conducted the Naumburg Orchestral Concerts, in the Naumburg Bandshell, Central Park, in the summer series.

In 1971, Antonini served as musical director on the CBS Television premier of Ezra Laderman's opera And David Wept, earning an Emmy Award for Outstanding Achievement in Religious Programming (1972). He collaborated in this premier production with such operatic luminaries as Sherrill Milnes, Rosalind Elias, and Ara Berberian. Several years later, in 1975, he joined forces once again with Berberian and mezzo-soprano Elaine Bonazzi for the CBS television movie, A Handful of Souls.

Antonini's collaborations at CBS Television extended beyond the realm of opera to include prominent figures from several professions including:

- Philanthropy – (John D. Rockefeller III)
- Government – (Jacqueline Kennedy Onassis)
- Journalism – (Charles Collingwood) Walter Cronkite, Daniel Shorr)
- Art – (Henry Moore, Kenneth Clark)
- Dance – (Mary Hinkson)
- Drama – (John Alexander, Julie Andrews, Ingrid Bergman, Betty Comden, Henry Fonda, Jackie Gleason, Steven Hill, Ron Holgate, Celeste Holm, Richard Kiley, Howard Lindsay, Michael Redgrave)
- Concert Stage – (Charles Anthony John Browning)

== Death ==
Alfredo Antonini died at the age of 82 during heart surgery in Clearwater, Florida, in 1983. He was buried in Sylvan Abbey Memorial Park cemetery in Clearwater and was survived by his wife Sandra and a son.

== Compositions ==
External image
- Photograph of Alfredo Antonini conudcting and dedicated to his "favorite composer" Paul Creston (1958); Here on digital.library.umkc.edu

- The Great City
- Sarabande
- Sicilian Rhapsody
- Suite for Cello and Orchestra
- Preludes for Organ
- Suite for Strings
- The United States of America, Circa 1790
- Mambo Tropical

== Discography ==
- Cinderella, vocalist Julie Andrews, Columbia Masterworks (OL5190), 12 Inch LP, 1957?
- American Fantasy, SESAC Records, 33 RPM LP, 195?
- Atmosphere By Antonini – Alfredo Antonini and His Orchestra, Coral Records (LVA 9031), 33PRM LP, 1956
- Romantic Classics, SESAC Records, 33 RPM LP, 195?
- Aaron Copland/Hugo Weisgall/Alfredo Antonini – Twelve Poems of Emily Dickinson, Columbia Masterworks (ML 5106), 33 RPM LP, 1956
- Songs from Sunny Italy – Richard Tucker with Alfredo Antonini Conducting the Columbia Concert Orchestra, Columbia Masterworks (ML 2155), 33 RPM LP, 1950
- Alfredo Antonini and His Orchestra – Dances of Latin America, London Records (LPB.294), 33 RPM LP, 1950
- Alfredo Antonini & The Columbia Concert Orchestra, soloist Richard Tucker, Columbia Masterworks (A-1540), 45 RPM, 195?
- Nestor Chayres Singing Romantic Songs of Latin America, Alfredo Antonini conductor, Decca, 78 RPM, 1947
- Juan Arvizu, Troubador of the Americas, Alfredo Antonini conductor, Columbia Records (#36663), 1941 78 RPM, 1941
- Latin American Music – Alfredo Antonini and Viva America Orchestra, Alfredo Antonini conductor of the Viva America Orchestra, Elsa Miranda vocalist, Alpha Records (#12205) 78 RPM, 1946
- Richard Tucker: Just For You with Alfredo Antonini and the Columbia Symphony Orchestra, Columbia Masterworks (A-1619-1), 45 RPM,195?
- Amapola (Joseph Lacalle), vocalist Nino Martini, Columbia (#17202-D) 78 RPM, 194?
- Bolero – No Me Lo Digas (Maria Grever), vocalist Nino Martini, Columbia (#17202-D), 194?
- Nestor Chayres & Alfredo Antonini, Decca (#23770), 78 RPM
- Granada (Agustin Lara), vocalist Nestor Chayres, Decca (#23770), 78 RPM (1946)
- Noche de Ronda (Maria Teressa Lara), vocalist Nestor Chayres, Decca (#23770), 78 RPM (1946)
- La Palma, Los Panchos Trio, Pilotone (#P45 5067), 78 RPM (194?)
- Rosa Negra, Alfredo Antonini Viva America Orchestra, Pilotone (#P45 5069), 78 RPM (194?)
- Alfredo Antonini and The Viva America Orchestra – Chiqui, Chiqui, Cha/Caminito De Tu Casa, Bosworth Music (BA.251), 78 RPM, (194?)
- Music of the Americas, Pilotone Album, 78 RPM LP, 194?
- La spagnola (V. Di Chiara), vocalist Carlo Morelli, Columbia (#17192D) 78 RPM (194?)
- Alma Mia (Maria Grever), vocalist Carlo Morelli, Columbia (#17192D) 78 RPM (194?)
- Viva Sevilla! and Noche de Amor vocalist Juan Arvizu, Columbia (#36664) 78 RPM (194?)
- Mi Sarape and Que Paso? vocalist Juan Arvizu, Columbia (#36665) 78 RPM (194?)
- El Bigot de Tomas and De Donde? vocalist Juan Arvizu, Columbia (#36666) 78 RPM (194?)
- Canta Il Marie (Mazzola) and Si Alguna Vez (Ponce) vocalist Carlo Morelli Columbia (#17263-D) 78 RPM
- Esta Noche Ha Pasado (Sabre Marrequin) vocalist Luis G. Roldan, Columbia (#6201-x) 78 RPM (194?)
- Tres Palabras (Osvaldo Farres) vocalist Luis G. Roldan, Columbia (#6201-x) 78 RPM (194?)

== Filmography ==
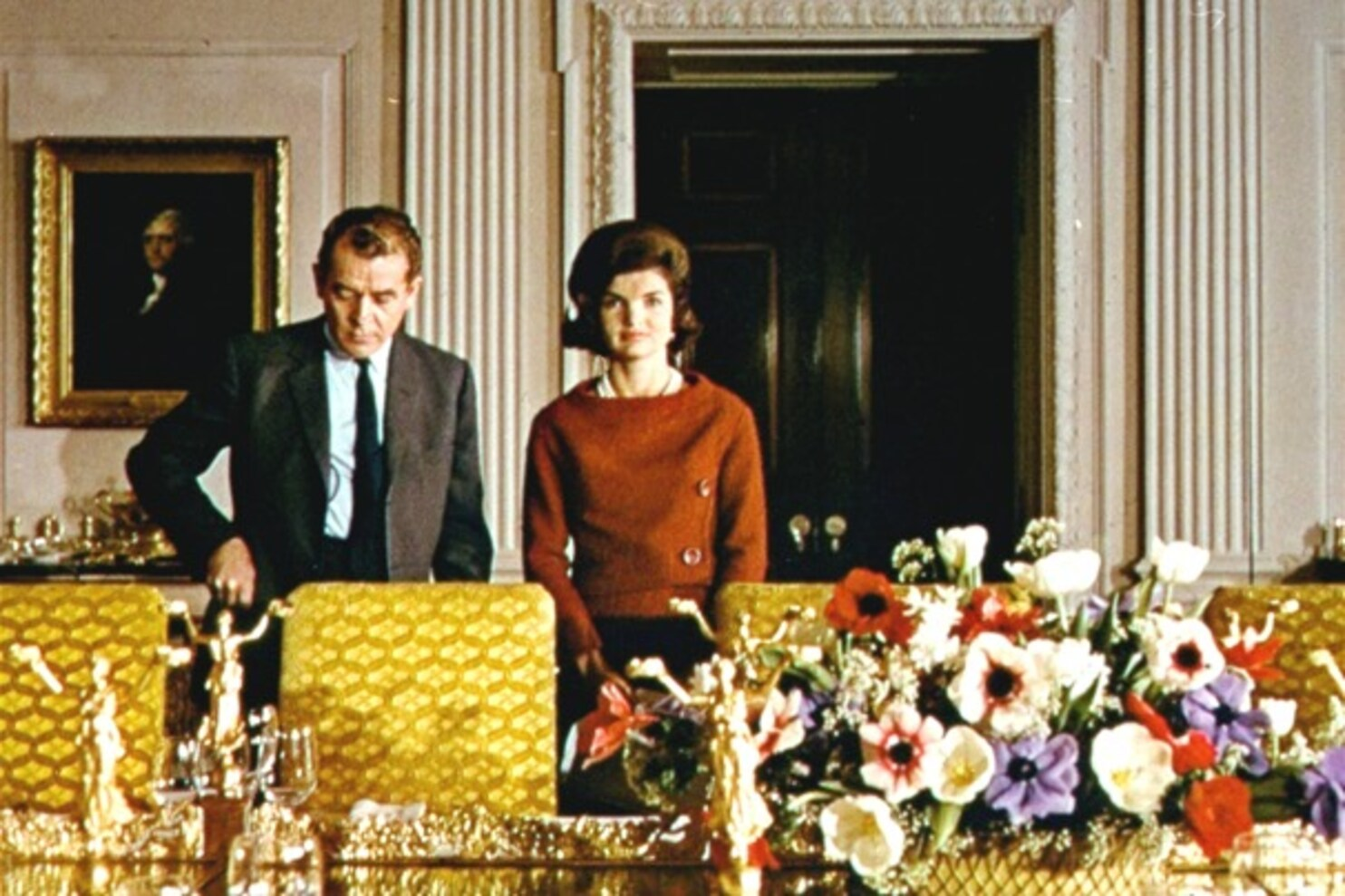
A Tour of the White House with Mrs. John F. Kennedy (1962) Jacqueline Kennedy and Charles Collingwood Charles Collingwood murrow27s boys

- A Handful of Souls – (TV Movie, Conductor, 1975)
- And David Wept – (TV Movie, music director, 1971)
- Gauguin in Tahiti: The Search for Paradise – (TV Documentary, Conductor, 1967)
- The Emperor's New Clothes – (TV Movie, Conductor, 1967)
- The Twentieth Century – Nehru: Man of Two Worlds – (CBS-TV, Conductor, 1966)
- Where the Spies Are – (Film, Conductor, 1966)
- CBS Reports – (TV Documentary series, Conductor, 1965)
- The Twentieth Century – The Nisei: The Pride and the Shame (CBS Documentary, Conductor, 1965)
- Jack and the Beanstalk – (TV Movie, Conductor, 1965)
- Pinocchio (TV Movie, Conductor, 1965)
- L'Enfance du Christ – (TV Movie, Conductor, 1964)
- CBS Repertoire Workshop – (TV Series, Conductor, 1964)
- The Twentieth Century – (CBS-TV Documentary Series, musical director, conductor, 1957–66)
- Arias and Arabesques – (TV Movie, Conductor, 1962)
- Cabeza de Vaca – (TV Movie, Conductor, 1962)
- A Tour of the White House – (TV Documentary, musical director, 1962)
- An Act of Faith – (TV Movie, musical director, 1961)
- Twenty-Four Hours in a Woman's Life – (TV Movie, Conductor, 1961)
- And On Earth, Peace – (TV Movie, Composer, 1961)
- Spring Festival of Music: American Soloists – (TV Movie, Self, 1960)
- The Right Man – (TV Movie, Conductor, 1960)
- The Fabulous Fifties – (TV Documentary, musical director, 1960)
- The Twentieth Century – The Movies Learn to Talk – (CBS documentary, Conductor, 1959)
- The American Musical Theater (CBS-TV documentary series, Conductor,1959)
- The Twentieth Century – The Incredible Turk (TV Documentary, Conductor, 1958)
- The Seven Lively Arts – (TV Series, musical director, 1957)
- Air Power – (TV Documentary, musical director, 1956–1957)
- Cinderella – (TV Special, music director, 1957)
- Studio One: Circle of Guilt – (CBS-TV, Conductor, 1956)

External image
- Photograph of Alfredo Antonini: conductor circa 1930; Here on Archives.nyphil

- Studio One: Dino – (CBS-TV, music director, 1956)
- Studio One: Star-Spangled Soldier – (CBS-TV, Music, 1956)
- Studio One in Hollywood – (TV Series, music director, 1954)
- Studio One: Dark Possession – (CBS-TV, Musical consultant, 1954)
- Studio One: Let me Go, Lover – (CBS-TV, music director, 1954)
- Studio One: Dry Run – (CBS-TV, Music, 1953)
- The Jane Froman Show – (TV Series, Conductor, 1952)
- The Cabinet of Dr. Caligari – (TV Movie, Composer, 1920)

== Awards ==
- Primetime Emmy Award for Outstanding Achievement in Religious Programming (1972)
- Award for Distinguished Service to Music from the National Association for American Composers and Conductors
- Title of Commendatore awarded by the President of Italy (1977)
- Order of Merit of the Italian Republic (1980)

== Archived works ==
- CBS Collection of Manuscript Scores 1890–1972 – within the New York Public Library for the Performing Arts at Lincoln Center in New York City, New York – Selected scores of compositions by Alfredo Antonini as broadcast on the CBS television network
- The New York Public Library for the Performing Arts at Lincoln Center in New York City, New York – Selected sound recordings featuring Alfredo Antonini conducting the CBS Symphony Orchestra for Voice of America.
- New York Philharmonic – Shelby White and Leon Levy Digital Archives – Selected concert programs, musical scores, scrape books and business documents by Alfredo Antonini.

== Professional affiliations ==
- American Society of Composers, Authors and Publishers ASCAP (1948)
