= Granada (song) =

1932 Mexican song

"Granada" is a song written in 1932 by Mexican composer Agustín Lara. The song is about the Spanish city of Granada and has become a standard in music repertoire.

The most popular versions are the original with Spanish lyrics by Lara (often sung operatically); a version with English lyrics by Australian lyricist Dorothy Dodd; and instrumental versions in jazz, pop, easy listening, flamenco or rock styles. Other versions in English also exist (one with lyrics by Al Stewart, and one with lyrics by Robert Musel and Edward Lisbona) but these are less common. An Italian version was written in 1954 by Enzo Luigi Poletto. There are also versions in German and other languages.

The song has been covered many times. It is José Carreras's signature tune. Popular versions include those by Plácido Domingo, Frankie Laine, Jorge Negrete, Juan Arvizu, Nestor Mesta Chayres, Mario Lanza, Franco Corelli, Pasquale Esposito, Bing Crosby, and Frank Sinatra. It has been sung in Italian by Claudio Villa, and in German by Fritz Wunderlich and Spanish pop-duo Baccara. During the international tour of The Three Tenors, "Granada" was the only song that all three singers — José Carreras, Plácido Domingo, and Luciano Pavarotti — all performed as solos in different concerts.

The plenary session of the City Council of Granada, unanimously, agreed in its session on September 4, 1997, to establish the version adapted by Professor D. Luis Megías Castilla as the official anthem of the City of Granada.

== Lyrics ==
Lara's lyrics are:

Granada tierra soñada por mí,
mi cantar se vuelve gitano
cuando es para ti.

Mi cantar, hecho de fantasía,
mi cantar, flor de melancolía,
que yo te vengo a dar.

Granada, tierra ensangrentada
en tardes de toros,
mujer que conserva el embrujo
de los ojos moros.

Te sueño rebelde y gitana,
cubierta de flores
y beso tu boca de grana,
jugosa manzana
que me habla de amores.

Granada, manola cantada
en coplas preciosas,
no tengo otra cosa que darte
que un ramo de rosas.

De rosas, de suave fragancia
que le dieran marco a la virgen morena.

Granada, tu tierra está llena
de lindas mujeres,
de sangre y de sol.

Dodd's version begins:

Granada, I'm falling under your spell,
and if you could speak, what a fascinating tale you would tell.

== Selective list of recorded versions ==
- 1932 Juan Arvizu with Orchestral ensemble for Victor Records
- 1944 Carlos Ramírez with Xavier Cugat's Orchestra, from the US film Two Girls and a Sailor (Spanish lyrics). Cugat recorded an instrumental version in 1958.
- 1946 Nestor Mesta Chayres – (Spanish lyrics) with the Alfredo Antonini Orchestra for Decca Records
- 1947 Deanna Durbin – Spanish lyrics (performed in the movie I'll Be Yours)
- 1949 Mario Lanza
- 1951 Desi Arnaz
- 1951 Bing Crosby – English lyrics – recorded February 5, 1951 with the Bando Da Lua for Decca Records
- 1954 Luís Piçarra
- 1954 Claudio Villa – Italian lyrics
- 1954 Frankie Laine, US #17 – English lyrics
- 1954 Tommy Dorsey – big band instrumental
- 1956 Caterina Valente – in English, French and Spanish
- 1956 Pérez Prado
- 1956 John Serry Sr. – accordion with instrumental ensemble (see Squeeze Play)
- 1958 Percy Faith – easy listening instrumental
- 1958 The Four Freshmen – Voices in Latin – English lyrics
- 1958 Jan Peerce
- 1958 Mario Del Monaco – with studio orchestra (Decca)
- 1958 Niño de Murcia
- 1959 Jane Morgan
- 1959 Alfredo Kraus
- 1960 Connie Francis – Spanish lyrics, and with the B-side "Quizás, Quizás, Quizás", both songs reached No. 7 in Spain.
- 1961 Ben E. King – English lyrics (on the album Spanish Harlem, US #57)
- 1961 Frank Sinatra, US #64 – English lyrics
- 1961 Al Martino, – Spanish lyrics
- 1961 Arthur Lyman – instrumental
- 1960s Fritz Wunderlich
- 1962 Hugo Avendaño – Spanish lyrics
- 1962 Grant Green on The Latin Bit – jazz instrumental
- 1963 The Shadows – Los Shadows
- 1963 Edmundo Ros – English lyrics
- 1963 Trini Lopez – English lyrics (Trini Lopez at PJ's)
- 1963 Peter Nero – piano instrumental
- 1964 Vikki Carr – Spanish lyrics
- 1964 Trini Lopez – Spanish lyrics (The Latin Album)
- 1964 Johnny Mathis – Spanish lyrics (Olé)
- 1965 Nicolai Gedda
- 1960s The Tornados – rock instrumental
- 1960s Violetta Villas – Spanish lyrics, opera vocalization
- 1967 [John Gary] - English lyrics, vocals and orchestra
- 1967 Paco de Lucía – flamenco guitar
- 1969 Hugo Winterhalter – easy listening
- 1970 Sergio Franchi – Spanish & English lyrics (UA single, and UA album Within Me)
- 1972 Muslim Magomaev
- 1976 Karel Gott – Czech lyrics
- 1976 Donna Hightower – disco version
- 1977 Baccara – disco version, Spanish lyrics
- 1978 Luisa Fernandez – disco version, Spanish lyrics
- 1979 Al Bano – Spanish & English lyrics
- 1982 Franco Corelli – Audio is from the 60´s
- 1985 Tamara Gverdtsiteli – Spanish lyrics
- 1989 The Red Army Chorus
- 1990 José Carreras – Spanish lyrics
- 1991 Plácido Domingo – Spanish lyrics
- 1993 Carlos Montoya – flamenco guitar
- 1997 Gato Barbieri – jazz saxophone
- 1998 John Farnham & Anthony Warlow – Spanish & English lyrics
- 2002 Tania Maria – jazz piano
- 2003 Russell Watson – Spanish lyrics – from the album Reprise
- 2004 Mnozil Brass – English lyrics
- 2005 Brad Mehldau Trio – jazz piano
- 2005 Masafumi Akikawa – Spanish lyrics
- 2006 Katherine Jenkins – mezzo-soprano, English lyrics
- 2007 True Symphonic Rockestra – Spanish lyrics
- 2007 Mario Frangoulis – Spanish lyrics
- 2008 The Canadian Tenors – Spanish lyrics
- 2008 Andrea Bocelli - Track 9 of his album Incanto
- 2010 Mark Vincent for his 2010 album Compass
- 2011 Joe McElderry – Spanish lyrics
- 2011 Il Volo – Spanish lyrics
- 2015 Canadian Brass – Chris Coletti on trumpet
- 2015 Aled Wyn Davies – Spanish lyrics
- 2016 Carlos Marín (Il Divo) – Spanish lyrics
- Bryn Terfel – Spanish lyrics
- Eydie Gormé
- Juan García Esquivel – instrumental
- Howard Morrison
- Jay and the Americans
- Jerry Vale
- Juan Diego Flórez – Spanish lyrics
- Julian Bream – classical guitar
- Luciano Pavarotti – Spanish lyrics
- Luciano Pavarotti & Jon Secada – Spanish lyrics
- Mantovani – easy listening instrumental
- James Last
- Ted Heath
- Renata Tebaldi – Spanish lyrics
- Stan Kenton – big band instrumental
- The Ten Tenors – Spanish lyrics
- Maurice André – piccolo trumpet
- Yoyoy Villame – parody English and Filipino lyrics
- André Rieu – instrumental
- Joselito – Spanish lyrics
- The Caretaker - song sampled in Everywhere at the End of Time, usually referred to as "Hell Sirens"
