= Juan Arvizu =

Mexican singer (1900–1985)

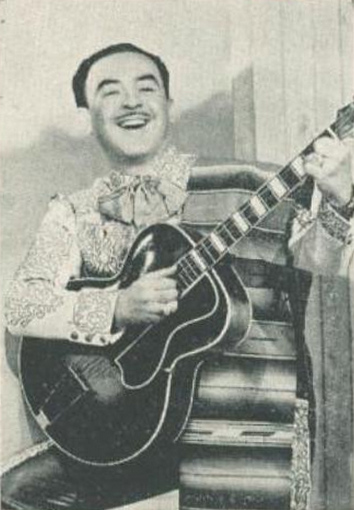
- Arvizu in 1944

Background information
- Also known as: "The Tenor With the Silken Voice"
- Born: Juan Nepomuceno Arvizu Santelices; May 22, 1900; Santiago de Querétaro, Mexico
- Origin: Mexico City, Mexico
- Died: November 19, 1985 (aged 85) Mexico City, Mexico
- Genres: Opera; Latin music
- Occupations: Lyric tenor, singer, actor
- Instrument: Vocals
- Years active: 1924–1967
- Labels: RCA; Columbia; Tico; Brunswick

Juan Nepomuceno Arvizu Santelices (known as Juan Arvizu; May 22, 1900 – November 19, 1985), was an acclaimed lyric tenor in Mexico and a noted interpreter of the Latin American bolero and tango on the international concert stage, on the radio and in film. He was widely noted for his interpretations of the works of Agustin Lara and María Grever and was nicknamed "The Tenor With the Silken Voice".

== Biography ==
=== Early years ===
Juan Nepomuceno Arvizu Santelices was born in Querétaro, Mexico, to Pedro Arvizu and Trinidad Santelices. As a child, he assisted his father as a radio-telegraph operator. His mother encouraged him to study vocalization, solfège and harmony while he sang in a children's choir. By the age of 22 he was accepted into the Conservatorio Nacional de Música (Mexico) in Mexico City, where he continued his studies. His artistic abilities attracted the attention of several music teachers including José Pierson, who had instructed such noted vocalists as Jorge Negrete, José Mojica, Alfonso Ortiz Tirado, Pedro Vargas and Juan Pulido. Arvizu first appeared with Pierson's opera company while performing on stage with the noted soprano Ángeles Ottein and Consuelo Escobar.

At the age of 24, Arvizu made his debut at the Teatro Esperanza Iris with a role in La sonámbula by Vincenzo Bellini. As a member of the Consuelo Escobar de Castor Opera Company he continued in this role and traveled abroad. He visited New York City during this time and continued to augment his operatic repertoire to include the Argentine tango and the works of María Grever and Alfonso Esparza Oteo. By 1927, Arvizu returned to Mexico and appeared in another operatic production at the Teatro Esperanza Iris of Giacomo Meyerbeer's work Dinorah.

While Arvizu's natural vocal qualities and the power of his operatic voice attracted the attention of the public, he faced financial obstacles in his professional endeavors at this time. With this in mind he increased his repertoire to include the popular tango and initiated appearances in cafes and cinemas. Pepe Cantillo, who directed one of the most famous music revues in Mexico soon engaged Arvizu. His performances in the opera house also attracted the attention of leading figures in the phonographic industry. At this time the popular music field welcomed such noted operatic artists as Margarita Cueto, Pedro Vargas, Juan Pulido, Carlos Mejía, Carlos Almenar Otero, Alfredo Sadel and Tito Schipa among others. Juan Arvizu was no exception, entrusting his voice to the Brunswick record label in 1928. His first recording of the song Varita de nardo by Joaquin Pardavé was well received among audiences. The RCA Victor record label soon included him on their staff, thereby beginning one of the most prolific careers in popular music. The composer Jorge del Moral entrusted his composition Por Unos Ojos to Arvizu, whose vocal versatility and musical qualities earned him the nickname "The Tenor With the Silken Voice".

=== International recognition ===
Based upon these achievements, Radio XEW in Mexico invited Arvizu in 1930 to inaugurate its first broadcast in 1930. This would not be the only time that the "Tenor With the Silken Voice" would receive such recognition. In fact, Arvizu had the honor of initiating broadcasts on several other international radio stations. For example, in 1935, he inaugurated a show on LR1 - Radio El Mundo in Buenos Aires, Argentina. Years later in 1942 he premiered with La Cadena de Las Amėricas of the Columbia Broadcasting System (CBS) and Voice of America on the Viva América show in New York, in collaboration with the orchestra conductor Alfredo Antonini, the Puerto Rican vocalist Elsa Miranda, the Argentine composer Terig Tucci, the Mexican American vocalist Eva Garza and the concert accordionist John Serry Sr. In 1941 he also collaborated with the Andre Kostelanetz Orchestra in live performance on the radio for WABC in New York City. By 1945 his performances on the CBS network were heard by audiences in twenty Latin American nations and were rebroadcast for members of America's Armed forces on the Armed Forces Radio Service. His performances with the CBS Pan American Orchestra were also noteworthy for helping to introduce Latin American music and the Mexican bolero to large audiences in the United States during the 1940s. But one of his greatest achievements was to "discover" one of Mexico's leading composers, Agustín Lara in 1929.

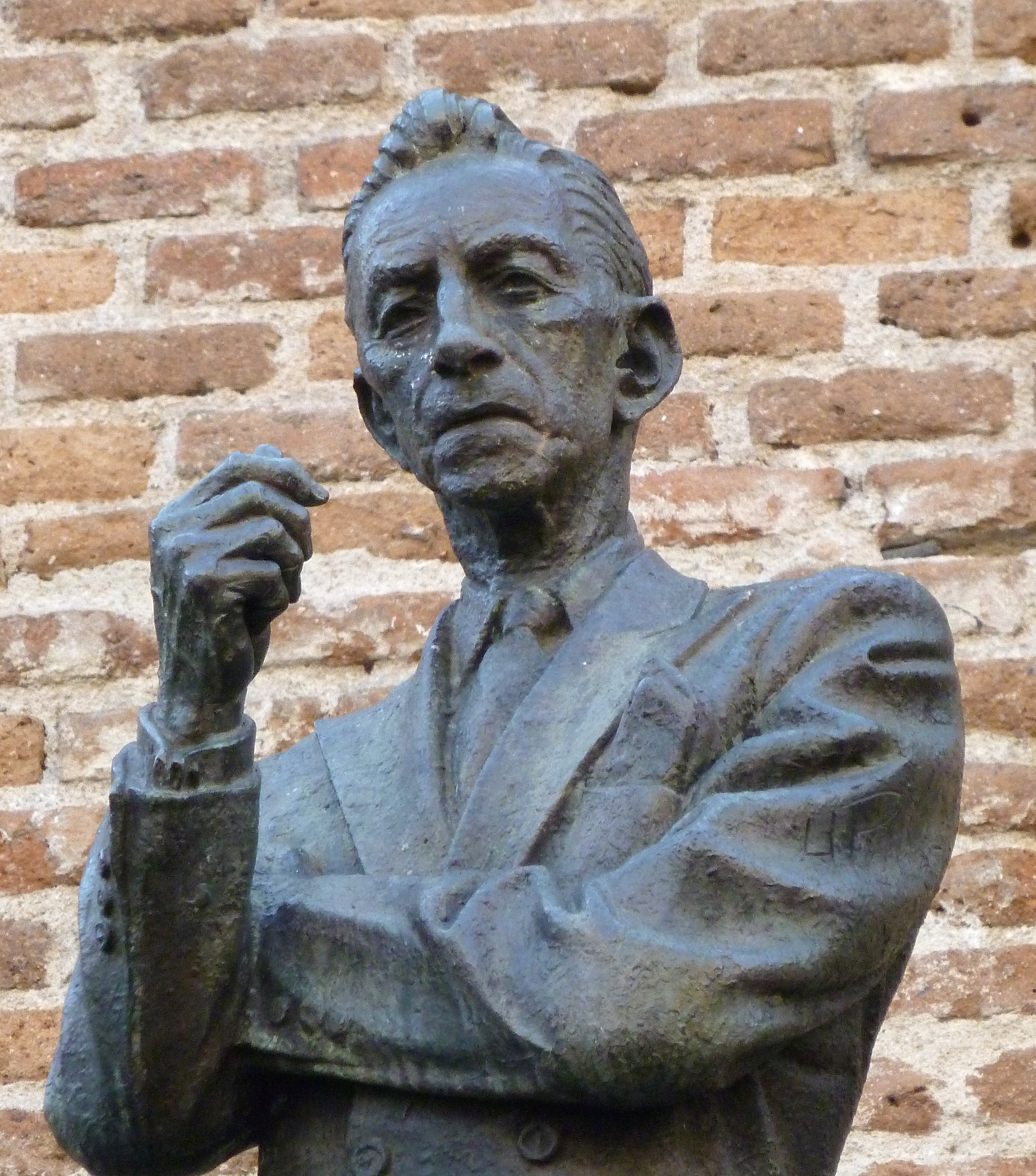
Agustín Lara (H. Peraza) Madrid 02

During the 1920s and 1930s, the tango was very popular in Mexico. Arvizu premiered many of these songs in Pepe Cantillo's music revue. While searching for an accompanist, the tenor agreed to hire an unknown bohemian pianist at the ordinary Café Salambó. That pianist was Agustín Lara. At first, Agustín Lara was a tango composer, but his compositions lacked the proper accompaniment of the tango orchestra. As a result, his works were classified within the "creole song" genre. Arvizu was the first singer to champion Lara's compositions through his performances in cinemas and on the radio. The performances of the Lara-Arvizu duo on radio XEW were well received by the public. Along with other leading vocalists of the time such as Pedro Vargas and Alfonso Ortiz Tirado, Arvizu helped to popularize several of Lara's greatest compositions. They included such works as: Aventura, Concha Nacar, Cuando Vuelvas, Enamorada, Granada, Santa and Tus Pupilas.

Juan Arvizu achieved international recognition in the 1930s. By 1935, the singer made his first international tour and arrived in Buenos Aires for the launching of the LR1 Radio El Mundo. While his stay in Buenos Aires was scheduled for only two months, it lasted for over a year and a half. It was a triumphant season for Juan Arvizu. This feat would be repeated years later when he finished his contract in New York with RCA Victor. He stayed in Argentina for 18 years and launched many concert tours abroad from this venue.

The zenith of Juan Arvizu's career emerged in 1944. In Argentina alone, the singer earned $60,000. Audiences flocked to the stages and concert venues where Juan Arvizu appeared. He lived for several years in Chile while performing boleros as well as in Colombia.

Upon returning to his native Mexico, however, Juan failed to receive the recognition which he had expected. With the passage of time, a new generation had emerged with different musical preferences. Juan had been pushed into the background. After a long tour in his native town of Queretáro, Mexico in 1967, he embarked upon a period of rest since his life had been characterized by continuous movement.

=== Recordings ===
External images
- Photograph of Juan Arvizu on CBS Radio with Alfredo Antonini and the CBS Pan American Orchestra in 1941; Here on Getty Images
- Photograph of Juan Arvizu on CBS Radio in 1941; Here on Getty Images
- Photograph of Juan Arvizu on CBS Radio in 1941 here on Getty images

Juan Arvizu was one of the most recorded singers in the history of Latin music. As a prolific performer, he recorded for several leading labels including: RCA Victor, Columbia Records and Tico Records. He often premiered compositions by several prominent Latin composers including: Mario Clavell from Argentina, Rafael Hernández Marín from Puerto Rico, Donato Roman Heitman from Chile, Enrique Fábrega from Panama, Carlos Vieco, Augusto Duque from Colombia, and Agustín Lara, Gonzalo Curiel and Gabriel Ruiz Galindo from Mexico.

Arvizu also performed in duo with other noted musicians. His recordings with Margarita Cueto include several famous songs such as: Taboga, Más Vale Tarde Que Nunca, Bajo el Palmar, Deseparacíon, among many others. With Juan Pulido he recorded El Último Beso and with Alfonso Ortiz Tirado, Negra Linda. Arvizu was also accompanied by several renowned orchestras of his time including: Marimba Panamerica, the Chucho Zarzosa Orchestra, the Vieri Fidanzani Orchestra, the Francisco Lomuto Orchestra, the E. Vigil and Robles Orchestra, the Orchestra of Juan S. Garrido, the CBS Pan American Orchestra, and many others.

Juan Arvizu is credited with several single recordings of boleros, aires, tangos, waltzes and milongas. It has been estimated that during the course of his career he recorded over 2,000 discs. Among some of the most popular titles are his interpretations of: Arrepentimiento Cada Vez Que Me Recuerdes, Corrientes y Esmeralda, Qué Fácil Es Decir, La Cumparsita, Lágrimas de Sangre, Madreselva Caminito, Mi Buenos Aires Querido, Mi Único Amor, Nido Gaucho, No Cantes Ese Tango, Nuestra Casita, Pecado, Plegaria, Prohibido, Salud Dinero y Amor, Señior Juez, Si Dejaras de Quererme, Sinceramente, Tengo Mil Novias, Verdemar, Una Cación.

==== Serpentina Doble ====
Among the many songs showcased by Arvizu is the composition Serpentina Doble by Juan Rezzano. The song tells the tale of a boy who was selling colored strips of paper and subsequently suffers a fatal accident caused by a vehicle which is driven by a pierrot at a carnival. The boy passes away in a hospital just as the carnival also comes to an end. The composer of the song is said to have heard his father singing the beautiful melody at home when he was very young.

=== Cinema ===
The "Seventh Art" also benefited from the presence of Juan Arvizu. He participated in several films including Santa and Reír llorando, which were produced in Mexico. In Cuba, Arvizu starred in the most important film of his career Ahora Seremos Felices with the charismatic Puerto Rican artist Mapy Cortés. By 1939, Arvizu had already reached the zenith of his fame. Even though the plot of the film was simple, it generated fabulous revenues. Arvizu sang several boleros by the composer Rafael Hernández including: Quiero Decirte, Las Palomitas, Purísima and Ahora Seremos Felices. In 1940 he also sang in the film Infidelidad in collaboration with the actor Jorge Vélez. In the 1950s he performed in several biographical films about the composer María Grever including: Cuando Me Vaya (1954) which earned two Ariel Awards and O Grande Amor De María Grever 1954 Leg (1954).

=== Performance style ===
During the course of his long career recording music for the Victor label, Arvizu's performances were reviewed by critics in such leading magazines as The Billboard. He was consistently praised for a passionate delivery as well as a dramatic style of chanting. He was also applauded for his full bodied chanting and the full tonal quality of his voice.

=== Death ===
Juan Arvizu died in Mexico City November 19, 1985. His musical legacy includes a compendium of single recordings for RCA Victor, Columbia Records and Tico Records some of which were produced in both North and South America. They embody an extensive repertoire which includes the music of his fellow Mexican artists Agustín Lara and María Grever. He is recognized as one of the leading Mexican tenors of his era who championed the compositions of Agustín Lara.

== Discography ==
External audio
- You may hear Juan Arvizu singing Gonzalo Curiel's bolero "Vereda Tropical" in Argentina circa 1939; Here on DAHR

Also included among Juan Arvizu's single recordings are:

- A La Misma Hora - Tico (#10-055 B) - Juan Arvizu with organist Salvador Muñoz perform this song by Ferradas Compos (19??)
- Chamaca Mia - Victor (#46108-B) - Juan Arvizu with orchestra performs this song by María Grever (1929)
- Daño - RCA Victor (#23-6818) - Juan Arvizu and the Orquesta Chucho Zarzosa perform this bolero by Carlos Arturo Briz (19??)
- De Donde? - Columbia (#36666) - Juan Arvizu and the CBS Tipica Orchestra conducted by Alfredo Antonini perform this song by María Grever (194?)
- El Ay, Ay, Ay - RCA Victor (#23-5260-b) - Juan Arvizu and Mario Clavell with Orquesta Federico Ojeda perform a rabanal by Juan S. Garrido (19??)
- El Bigote de Tomas - Columbia (#36666) - Juan Arvizu and the CBS Tipica Orchestra conducted by Alfredo Antonini perform this song by Valie (194?)
- El Tulipan RCA Victor (23-6318) - Juan Arvizu and La Orquestra Chucho Zarzosa perform this polca by Clara Solovera (19??)
- Ella - Tico (#10-056-B) - Juan Arvizu and the Orquesta Simon Alvarez perform this bolero by J. A. Jimenaz (19??)
- Enamorada - Barcelona Compaňia del Gramófono Odeón (AQ 73065) - Juan Arvizu with Orchestra perform this bolero by Agustín Lara (1946)
- Granado - Victor (30705) - Juan Arvizu with Orchestra sings this bolero by Agustín Lara (1932)
- Juan Arvizu - Trubador of the Americas- Columbia (#36663) - Juan Arvizu with the CBS Tipica Orchestra conducted by Alfredo Antonini (1941) List of musical selections: Rancho Alegre- Felipe Bermejo Araujo, Duerme - Prado
- La Bamba - RCA Victor (#68-0612-A) - Juan Arvizu with orchestra performs this song by Luis Martinez Serrano (19??)
- Lejos - Victor (#32550-B) - Juan Arvizu and the Alfredo Cibelli Orchestra perform this canción creolla by M. Theresa Lara (1934)
- Llevame - Tico (#10-056-A) - Juan Arvizu and the Orquesta Simon Alvarez perform this bolero by Juan Clauso (19??)
- Me lo Cantaron Ayer - RCA Victor (#23-5260-A) - Juan Arvizu and La Orquesta de Federico Ojeda perform this bolero mambo by Alcas/Daglio (19??)
- Mi Carta - RCA Victor (#68-0612-B) - Juan Arvizu and orchestra perform this song by Mario Clavelli (19??)
- Mi Sarape - Colombia (#36665) - Juan Arvizu and the CBS Tipica Orchestra conductor Alfredo Antonini perform this song by María Grever (194?)
- Nada, Nada - RCA Victor (#23-1233-A)- Juan Arvizu and the Orquesta de la Radio Caracas perform this guaracha by Jose Reyna (19??)
- No Hagas Llorar A Esa Mujer - RCA Victor (#23-6818) - Juan Arvizu and the Orquesta Chucho Zarzosa perform this bolero by Joaquin Pardarve (19??)
- No Mereces Nada - RCA Victor (#23-7149) - Juan Arvizu and La Orquesta Rafael de Paz perform this song by Manuel Alvarez Maciste (19??)
- Noche de Amor - Columbia (#36664) - Juan Arvizu and the CBS Tipica Orchestra conducted by Alfredo Antonini music by Tchaikovsky (194?)
- Perfidia - Victor (#82690-A) - Juan Arvizu with Marimba Pan-Americana and accordion perform this Foxtrot by Alberto Dominguez (19??)
- Pobre Corazon - RCA Victor (#23-6936) - Juan Arvizu with piano, guitar and accordion perform this Valse Pasillo by Manilo/Oliviero (19??)
- Poquito a Poco - Tico (#10-055A) - Juan Arvizu and the Simon Alvarez Orchestra perform this song by Don Fabian (19??)
- Que Paso? - Columbia (#36665) - Juan Arvizu and the CBS Tipica Orchestra conducted by Alfredo Anonini perform this song by Cortazar (194?)
- Senior del Milagro - RCA Victor (#23-6936) - Juan Arvizu performs this bolero by Cancho Manisella Casto with piano, guitar and accordion (19??)
- Señora Tentación - Barcelona Compaňia del Gramófono Odeón (AQ 73067) - Juan Arvizu with Orchestra perform this bolero by Agustín Lara (1946)
- Tu, Tu, y Tu - Victor (#46108-A) - Juan Arvizu performs this song by María Grever (1929)
- Ven - Victor (#32250-A) - Juan Arvizu perform this fox trot bolero by Gonzolo Curiel with the Alfredo Cibelli Orchestra (1934)
- Viva Sevilla! - Columbia (#36664) - Juan Arvizu and the CBS Tipica Orchestra conducted by Alfredo Antonini perform this song by Lavidada/Delmoral (194?)
- Volvi - Tico (#10-059 B) - Juan Arvizu with piano and orchestra perform this song by E. Grenet (19??)
- Voy Gritando por la Calle RCA Victor (#23-7149) Juan Arvizu and La Orqesta Rafael de Paz perform this bolero by Fernando Z. Maldanado (19??)
- Ya lo Ves - RCA Victor (#23-1233-B) - Juan Arvizu and the Orquesta de la Radio Caracas perform this bollero with Trio Mastra (19??)
- Yo - Tico (#10-059 A) - Juan Arvizu and the organist Salvador Muñoz perform this song by J. A. Jimenez (19??)

== Filmography ==
- O Grande Amor De María Grever 1954 Leg - Juan Arvizu as himself singing (1954)
- Cuando Me Vaya - Juan Afrvizu as himself singing (1954)
- Infidelidad - Juan Arvizu as himself singing (1940)
- Ahora Seremos Felices - Juan Arvizu as a singer (1938)

== Archived works ==
- Recordings by Juan Arvizu in The Discography of American Historical Recordings. Here on DAHR

- The Discography of American Historical Recordings catalog at the University of California at Santa Barbara includes selected recordings by Juan Arvizu for the RCA Victor label (1929-1956) and the Brunswick label (1928).
