= Dorothy Dodd =

Dorothy Dodd (1926 - 2006) was an Australian popular song composer and lyricist of the mid-twentieth century. She was best known for the English lyrics to the widely recorded song "Granada".

Her other works include English lyrics for "Historia de amor" by Carlos Almaran, entitled "The History of Love", and lyrics for "Velvet Waters", an American instrumental composition by William Plunkett. Vocal versions of "Velvet Waters" were recorded in Australia by Bruce Gillespie (1960) and Tony Worsley (1965).

Dodd studied at the Sydney Conservatorium of Music and had her first song published, "Rainbow of Dreams", at age 20.

She was President of the Fellowship of Australian Composers.

Further songs composed by Dodd include:

- The People in the Park (The Inspiration Waltz) (music by Leila Ruth Rowland) (1948)
- Caravan of Dreams (1945)
- Couldn't You Learn To Love Me (1948)
- Making A Cake For Mary (1945)
- Overcast (1942)
- Remember The Day (1943)
- There's A New Kinda Moon (1948)
- When Winter Turns To Spring (1942)
- Boulevarde Romance (Bistro) (music by Albert Dutrieux and Henry Segers; recorded by Ray Melton) (1961).
