= Elsa Miranda =

Puerto Rican-born Argentinian actress (1922–2007)

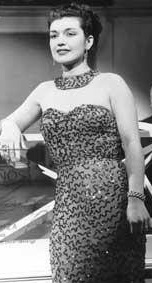
- Elsa Miranda in 1950

Background information
- Born: Elsa Miranda; 14 February 1922; Ponce, Puerto Rico
- Died: 27 April 2007 Old Bridge, New Jersey
- Genres: Popular Song, Bolero, Latin American, Rumba, Jazz
- Occupations: Singer, Actress
- Label: Pilotone

Elsa M. Miranda (14 February 1922 – 27 April 2007) was a noted Puerto Rican singer who was featured on radio and television in the United States during the Golden Age of Radio in the 1940s. As a naturalized Argentinian, she was also active as a film actress in South America during the 1950s.

== Early years ==
Elsa Miranda was born in Ponce, Puerto Rico, a city located in the southern region of the island. She moved to New York City with her mother Amelia Miranda (1898-2007) and became a performer who first attained notoriety as a vocalist through her live performances during the Golden Age of Radio in the United States in the 1940s. Included among her most popular songs were Adiós Mariquita Linda as performed with Alfredo Antonini's Viva America Orchestra, Cariñoso as performed with Desi Arnaz and his orchestra, Besos de Fuergo and Sonata Fantasía among others.

== Miss Chiquita Banana ==
Miranda first appeared on the radio performing the promotional singing commercial Chiquita Banana in 1945. Her interpretation of the tropical tune proved to be immensely popular and was broadcast over 2,700 times per week. These commercial radio broadcasts created widespread notoriety for Miranda. She was also celebrated as one of the most popular models in the "Miss Chiquita Banana" contest during the 1940s, making several advertising and promotional film appearances on behalf of the Chiquita brand. She subsequently collaborated in various musical events representing the brand with Arthur Fiedler and the Boston Pops Orchestra during 1945 and 1946.

External audio
- You may listen to Elsa Miranda in the first "Chiquita Banana" commercial here
- You may listen to Elsa Miranda singing "Chiquita Banana" with Alfredo Antonini's Viva America Orchestra in 1946 here on archive.org

As a result of this exposure, Miranda soon emerged in a series of performances on radio networks in New York City. By 1946, she appeared on such network broadcasts as The Jack Smith Show on CBS and Leave It To Mike on Mutual. At this time she also engaged in a series of collaborations with noted interpreters of Latin American music in New York including Xavier Cugat on the C-C Spotlight Bands show for WOR radio and Alfredo Antonini on the Viva America show for the Columbia Broadcasting System and Voice of America. While performing on CBS's La Cadena de las Americas she also collaborated with several international musicians of that era including: the Mexican tenors Juan Arvizu and Nestor Mesta Chayres, the Argentine composer/arranger Terig Tucci and members of the CBS Pan American Orchestra including John Serry Sr.

== Recording Latin American music in the United States ==
Before long, Miranda engaged in a series of recordings in collaboration with leading conductors of Latin American music in the United States. Her performances included renditions of Cariñoso, Carnival in Rio, I'll Never Love Again and Tia Juana with the Desi Arnaz Orchestra for Victor Records in 1946 and 1947. They also included performances with Alfredo Antonini on recordings for Pilotone Records and Alpha Records which included: Alma Llanera, Silencio, Music of the Americas and Songs and Dances of Latin America.

By 1947, Mianda also collaborated in Puerto Rican radio shows with Rafael Pont Flores, Elmo Torres Perez, Pepito Torres and his Siboney Orchestra and the Dúo Rodríguez-De Códova (Alicía and Adalberto, who once performed for WEMB).

== Cinema ==
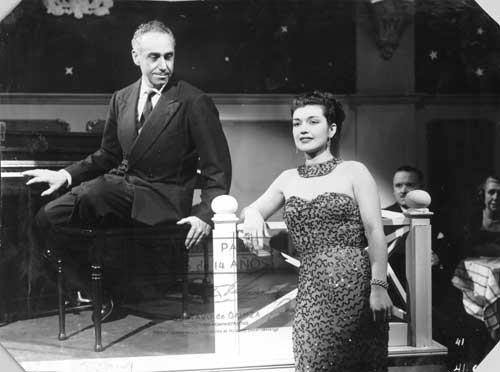
Carlos Ginés and Elsa Miranda in Captura Recomendad (1950

As the 1950s emerged, Miranda appeared in the film Captura Recomendada as a musical performer with Carlos Ginés. She also appeared later in the decade in the film Ensayo Final (1955) in which she shared scenes with such actors as Carlos Ginés, Gloria Ferrandiz, Ricardo Lavié, Margarita Corona, Eduardo Rudy, Nathán Pinzon, Alberto Closas, Santiago Gómez Cou and Nelly Panizza. She also appeared on the television program Tropicana Club with Ángel Magaňa, Carlos Castro "Castrito" and Mario Pocoví. In addition, she collaborated in 1955 in Comedias Musicales with Pedro Quartucci, Perla Alvarado, Angel Eleta, Lita Moreno and Dorita Vernet. In 1952 she also appeared in the theater production of Sonrisas y Melodías.

In addition to her recordings with the Alfredo Antonini Viva America Orchestra and the Desi Arnaz Orchestra, Miranda included several recordings of boleros with the Cuban René Touzet Orchestra for Seeco Records in her discography.

Miranda's musical performances on both radio and television were widely applauded by members of the public as well as professional critics of her time. For example, reviewers in The Billboard magazine specifically applauded Elsa Miranda for her sweet and spirited renditions of boleros. In addition, they cited her for the intimacy of her performances and her ability to contrast English and Spanish lyrics with such ease.

== Death ==
On 27 April 2007, Miranda died at the Madison Center in Old Bridge, New Jersey, at the age of 85. Her cremated remains were buried in Calvary Cemetery in Cherry Hill, New Jersey. She is survived by her daughter, her sister, two granddaughters, and three great-grandchildren. Her musical legacy includes several single recordings of popular Latin American music from the Golden Age of Radio on major labels including: Columbia Records, Victor Records and Alpha Records.

== Discography ==
External audio
- Elsa Miranda and the Alfredo Antonini Viva America Orchestra performing "There's Still A Little Time" in 1946; Here on Archive.org

- Adios Mariquita Linda - Alpha (#12206) Elsa Miranda sings this bolero by Marcos A. Jimenez with Alfredo Antonini's Viva America Orchestra (1946)
- Alma Llanera - Pilotone (#5071) - Elsa Miranda sings with the Alfredo Antonini Viva America Orchestra (1946)
- Caminito de Tu Casa - Alpha (#12206) - Elsa Miranda sings this bolero by Julio Alberto Hernández with Alfredo Antonini's Viva America Orchestra (1946)
- Cariñoso - Victor (#25-1071) - Elsa Miranda sings with the Desi Arnaz Orchestra (1947)
- Carnival in Rio - Victor (#25-1071) - Elsa Miranda performs with the Desi Arnaz Orchestra (1947)
- Chapinita - Alpha (#12206) - Elsa Miranda performs this bolero by Miguel Sandoval with Alfredo Antonini's Viva America Orchestra (1946)
- Flores Negras - Pampa (#11039-A) - Elsa Miranda sings this bolero by Sergio De Karlo with Vlady and his Orchestra (19??)
- I'll Never Love Again - Victor (#20-2020) - Elsa Miranda sings the lyrics in English, with the Desi Arnaz Orchestra (1946)
- La Mulata Tomasa - Alpha (#12205) - Elsa Miranda sings this bolero by Lazaro Qintero Alfredo Antonini's Viva America Orchestra (1946)
- La Zandunga - Alpha (#12205) - Elsa Miranda sings this bolero by Andres Gutierrez with Alfredo Antonini's Viva America Orchestra (1946)
- Mi Nuevo Amor - Alpha (#12206) - Elsa Miranda sings this bolero with the Alfredo Antonini Viva America Orchestra (1946)
- Music of the Americas - Alpha (#????) - Elsa Miranda sings with the Alfredo Antonini Viva America Orchestra (1947)
- No Puedo Ser Feliz - Seeco (#7728) - Elsa Miranda sings this song by Adolfo Guzman with the Rene Touzet Orchestra (19??)
- No Te Importa Saber - Seeco (#7729) - Elsa Miranda sings this song by Rene Touzet with the Rene Touzet Orchestra (19??)
- Noche Azul - Seeco (#7729) - Elsa Miranda sings this Cha Cha Cha by Ernesto Lecuona with the Rene Touzet Orchestra (19??)
- Noche de Ronda - Alpha (#12205) - Elsa Miranda sings this bolero by Agustín Lara with Alfredo Antonini's Viva America Orchestra (1946)
- Punal en el Alma - Seeco (#7728) - Elsa Miranda sings this song by Paul Arenas with the Rene Touzet Orchestra (19??)
- Silencio - Pilotone (#5070) - Elsa Miranda sings with the Alfredo Antonini Viva America Orchestra (1946)
- Songs and Dances of Latin America - Alpha (#A-3) - Elsa Miranda sings with the Alfredo Antonini Orchestra (1947)
- There's Still A Little Time - Alpha (1001B) - Elsa Miranda sings with the Alfredo Antonini Viva America Orchestra (1946)
- Tres Palabras - Alpha (#12205) - Elsa Miranda sings this bolero by Osvaldo Farres with Alfredo Antinini's Viva America Orchestra (1946)

== Filmography ==
- Ensayo Final - Elsa Miranda performing in the cast (1955)
- Captura Recomendada - Elsa Miranda performing as herself (1950)

== See also ==
- List of Puerto Ricans
- History of women in Puerto Rico
