= Viva América =

Former radio network supporting Pan-Americanism

Viva Amėrica
- Genre: Classical music Popular music Latin music Bolero
- Country of origin: United States
- Languages: English, Spanish
- Syndicates: CBS Network of the Americas
- Starring: Alfredo Antonini; Juan Arvizu; Nestor Chaires; Eva Garza; Elsa Miranda; Pat O'Brien; Los Panchos Trio; Luis G. Roldan; John Serry Sr. Kate Smith
- Announcer: Harry Kramer
- Produced by: Office of the Coordinator of Inter-American Affairs
- Executive producer: Edmund Chester
- Original release: 1940 – 1949
- Sponsored by: Voice of America

Viva América was an American musical radio program which was broadcast live over the CBS radio network and to North and South America over the La Cadena de las Américas (Network of the Americas) during the 1940s (1942–1949) in support of Pan-Americanism during World War II. It was also broadcast for the benefit of members of the armed forces in Europe during World War II over the Armed Forces Network. All broadcasts of this program were supervised under the strict government supervision of the United States Department of State and the Office of the Coordinator of Inter-American Affairs (OCIAA) as part of the United States Cultural Exchange Programs cultural diplomacy initiative authorized by President Franklin D. Roosevelt (via Voice of America) during World War II through the Office for Coordination of Commercial and Cultural Relations (OCCCRBAR), and the Office of the Coordinator of Inter-American Affairs directed by Nelson Rockefeller.

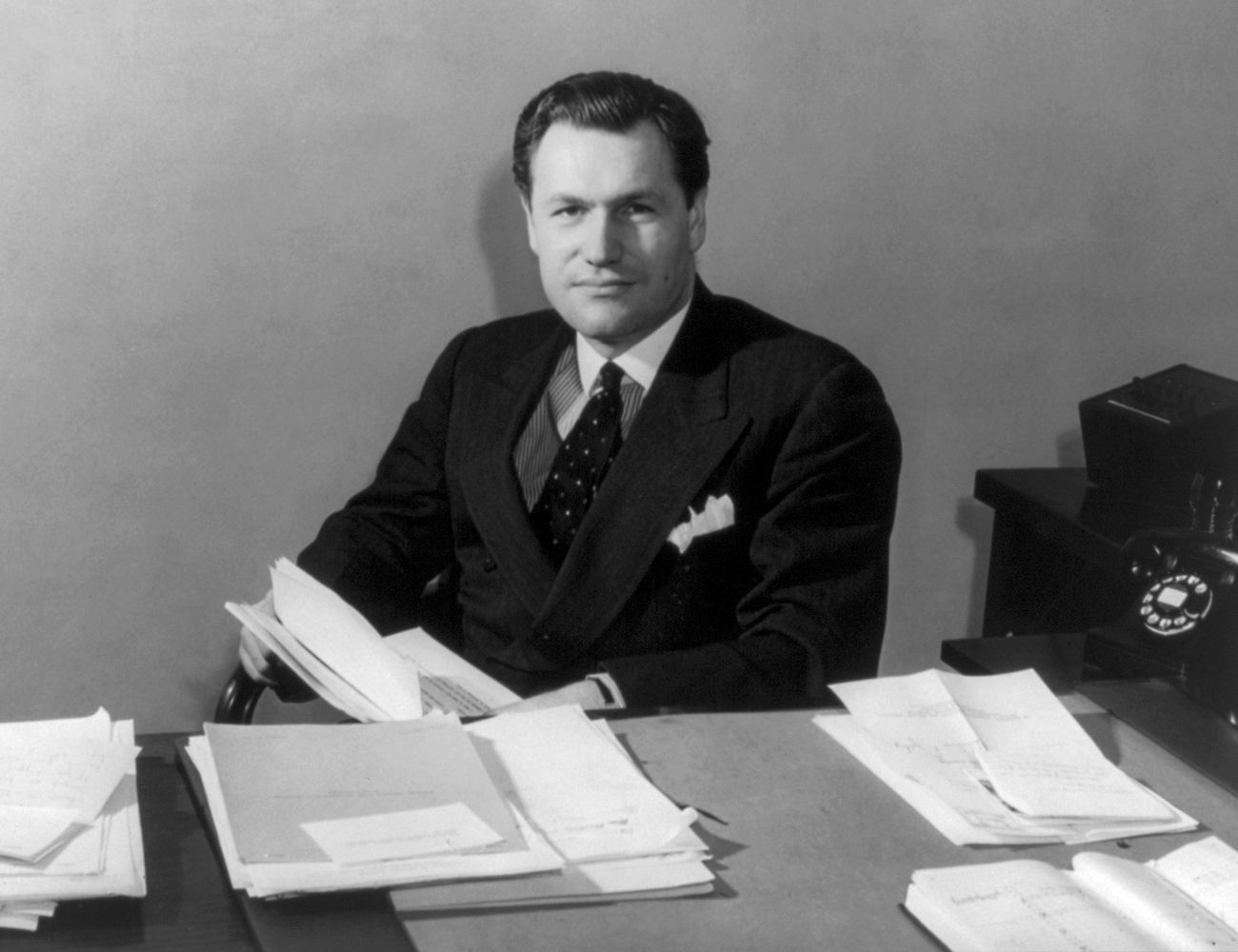
Nelson Rockefeller – Coordinator of Inter-American Affairs (1940) OCIAA-Nelson-Rockefeller

This imaginative program represented a collaboration between government and private industry during the turbulent World War II era in an effort to foster cultural exchanges and cultural diplomacy throughout the Americas as part of President Franklin D. Roosevelt's Good Neighbor policy. It featured live performances of the CBS Pan American Orchestra under the musical direction of the noted conductor Alfredo Antonini. By 1945, performances by the orchestra on the CBS "La Cadena de los Americas" radio network were enjoyed by audiences in twenty Latin American nations and throughout North America. As a result of its cultural authenticity, it emerged over the years as the network's most popular musical program.

Viva América was primarily conceived in an effort to foster benevolent diplomatic relations throughout the Americas during World War II by showcasing the talents of a wide variety of respected professional musicians from both North and South America. In this regard, it proved to be highly successful and functioned under the direct supervision of the Department of State as a cultural exchange program (as opposed to a propaganda program). The collaborative performances by musicians who were featured on the program also served to introduce large audiences in the United States to innovative forms of Latin music including the Mexican bolero. Included among the renowned soloists were: Juan Arvizu (the Mexican "Tenor with the Silken Voice"); Nestor Mesta Chayres (Mexican tenor – aka "El Gitano De México"); Eva Garza (Mexican songstress); Terig Tucci, (Argentine composer/arranger) Miguel Sandoval (Guatemalan composer/conductor), Elsa Miranda (Puerto Rican Vocalist/Actress), Los Panchos Trio (Latin vocalists) Manuolita Arriola (Mexican vocalist), Kate Smith (American contralto), Pat O'Brien (American actor) and John Serry Sr. (an American concert accordionist and featured soloist).

External audio
- You may listen to the Chilean cueca dance La Palma as sung by Los Panchos Trio with Alfredo Antonini's Viva América Orchestra in 194? here

Broadcasts of this program were personally supervised by Edmund A. Chester, Vice President at the CBS network and Director of Latin-American Relations and Short Wave Broadcasting (1940–1948). Mr. Chester could often be found visiting the control room at the CBS broadcast studios in New York City in order to enjoy his series of live concerts and to exchange insights with his staff of musicians and recording artists. At the governmental level, they were closely monitored by the Office of Inter-American Affairs through the Office for Coordination of Commercial and Cultural Relations (OCCCRBAR) under the direction of Nelson Rockefeller and the Department of State. In recognition of their efforts to foster greater understanding between the peoples of Cuba and the United States on this program, both Edmund Chester and William S. Paley were awarded the Carlos Manuel de Céspedes National Order of Merit by the Cuban government – its highest civilian honor.

The onset of the post World War II era precipitated the onset of the Cold War and the initiation of new governmental oversight of the broadcast industry. As a consequence of these developments, exclusive control for the La Cadena de las Américas was essentially transferred to the Department of State from Voice of America in 1948. As the focal point for American foreign policy shifted away from South America toward Europe broadcasts of this program were terminated (circa 1949) and the broadcasting links provided to South America by the Columbia Broadcast System CBS were eliminated.

Several historic master disk transcriptions of this program were recorded during live broadcasts and preserved on 78 rpm vinyl disks for Voice of America. They were archived by the Department of State until the 1970s and have since passed into private collections.
