= Nestor Mesta Chayres =

Mexican tenor (1908–1971)

Néstor Mesta Cháyres
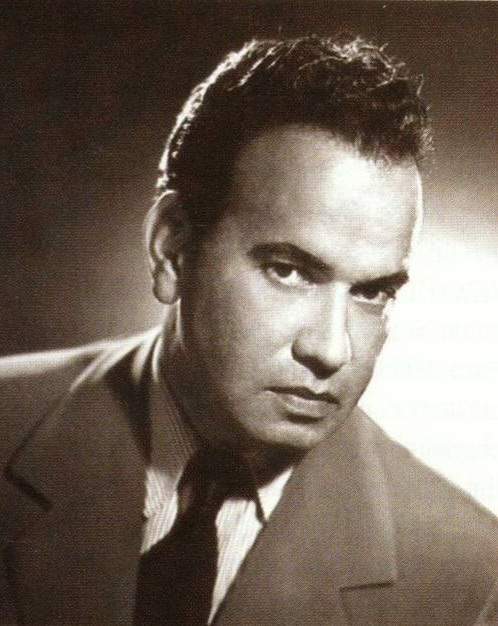

Background information
- Also known as: Nestor Chaires
- Born: Néstor Mesta Chayres; February 26, 1908; Ciudad Lerdo, Mexico
- Died: June 29, 1971 (aged 63) Mexico City, Mexico
- Genres: Opera; bolero; vocal music
- Occupation: Lyric tenor
- Instrument: Voice
- Years active: 1929–1970
- Labels: RCA Victor; Decca Records
- Formerly of: National Symphony Orchestra; PA Orchestra; NY Philharmonic; Chicago Opera; Montreal Symphony; VoA; La Cadena de las Américas; Arvizu; Antonini; Grever; Lara; Serry; Tirado

External audio
- You may hear Nestor Mesta Chayres with John Serry Sr and the Alfredo Antonini Orchestra playing the bolero "La Morena de mi Copla" in 1946; Here on DAHR

Néstor Mesta Chayres (or Chaires; February 26, 1908 – June 29, 1971) was an acclaimed tenor in Mexico and a noted interpreter of Spanish songs, boleros and Mexican romantic music on the international concert stage. He was widely commended for his artistic renditions of the works of Agustín Lara and María Grever and was nicknamed "El Gitano de México" ("The Mexican Gypsy").

== Biography ==
Néstor Mesta Chayres was born to Florentino Mesta and Juana Chayres in a family which included six additional children: Juanita, María Luisa, Herminia, Óscar, Jesús and Margarita in the city of Lerdo, Mexico. His initial studies in music were provided by a local teacher and an organist at the parish church. Even as a child he showed promise as an operatic singer. In his youth, he was also known to sing to a recording of Caro Nome from Giuseppe Verdi's opera Rigoletto. While still in high school, he exhibited an exceptional vocal aptitude which earned him several awards. After the death of his father in 1925, he earned a scholarship to the National Conservatory of Music in Mexico City. His studies included instructions in music theory, harmony, counterpoint, and voice with Lambert Castañeros - who had performed at La Scala in Milan, Italy.

Néstor's professional career began in the artistic center of the Mexican capital in 1929 performing songs of Jorge del Moral and Agustín Lara at the Bolivár Amphitheater at the National Preparatory School. Soon he achieved success on the radio station X.E.B. in Mexico City, where he continued to perform for four years. By 1933 he launched a concert tour with the pianist Jorge del Moral to Havana, Cuba where he performed the waltz Divina Mujer at various theaters. He also appeared in three gala concerts for the President of the Republic during his two-month tour on the island. After returning to Mexico City in 1934, he also recorded several songs including Morena (Jorge del Moral).

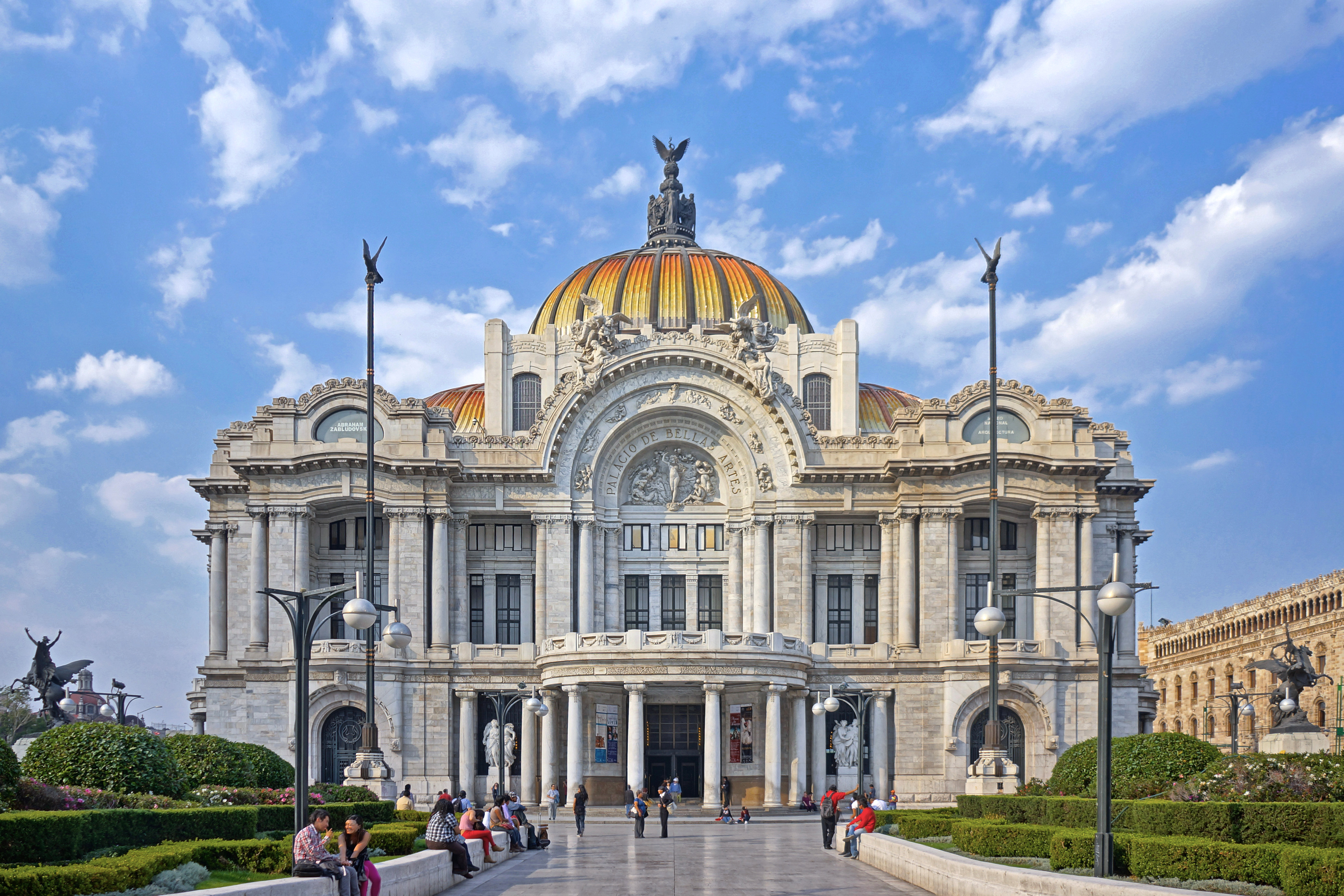
Palace of Fine Arts, Mexico City Bellas Artes 01

By the early 1940s, Cháyres had achieved extensive notoriety throughout Mexico. He soon collaborated with the Sypmphony Orchestra of Mexico in a concert at the prestigious Palace of Fine Arts in Mexico City in 1943. This set the stage for Néstor's debut in New York City on the radio for WABC under the direction of Andre Kostelanetz and a subsequent concert with the Philadelphia Orchestra. As a distinguished opera vocalist, Chayres was also invited by the CBS network to collaborate with the contralto Tona la Negra and Andre Kostelanetz conducting the Mexican Symphony Orchestra in a special Easter Sunday broadcast as supervised by the OIAA (Office of Inter-American Affairs) of the United States Department of State. In the early 1940s he also concertized regularly at the Havana Madrid night club in New York to the acclaim of critics.

Cháyres joined the staff at the Columbia Broadcasting System within CBS Radio's La Cadena de las Américas in 1943 under the musical direction of Alfredo Antonini as a featured soloist on the radio program Viva América while collaborating with the accordionist John Serry Sr. and the vocalist Manolita Arriola. He continued to collaborate with Antonini on additional live radio broadcasts for Voice of America and the Department of State's Office of International Broadcasting and Cultural Affairs in subsequent years. These performances were also broadcast overseas for the benefit of the members of America's armed forces personnel during World War II In addition, they helped to introduce Latin American music and the Mexican bolero to large audiences throughout the United States during the 1940s. Several recordings of boleros were also produced in collaboration with Antonini and his orchestra during this time on Decca Records including: Noche de Ronda (23770 B) and Granada (23770 A). His recordings in both North and South America for RCA Victor from this period featured collaborations with the Orquesta Radio Caracas and the Orquesta Gonzalo Cervera. They included: Princesita (# 90-0595-A), Todo Mi Ser (# 90-0595-B), Manolete (# 23-0853-A) and Silverio (#20-0853-B).

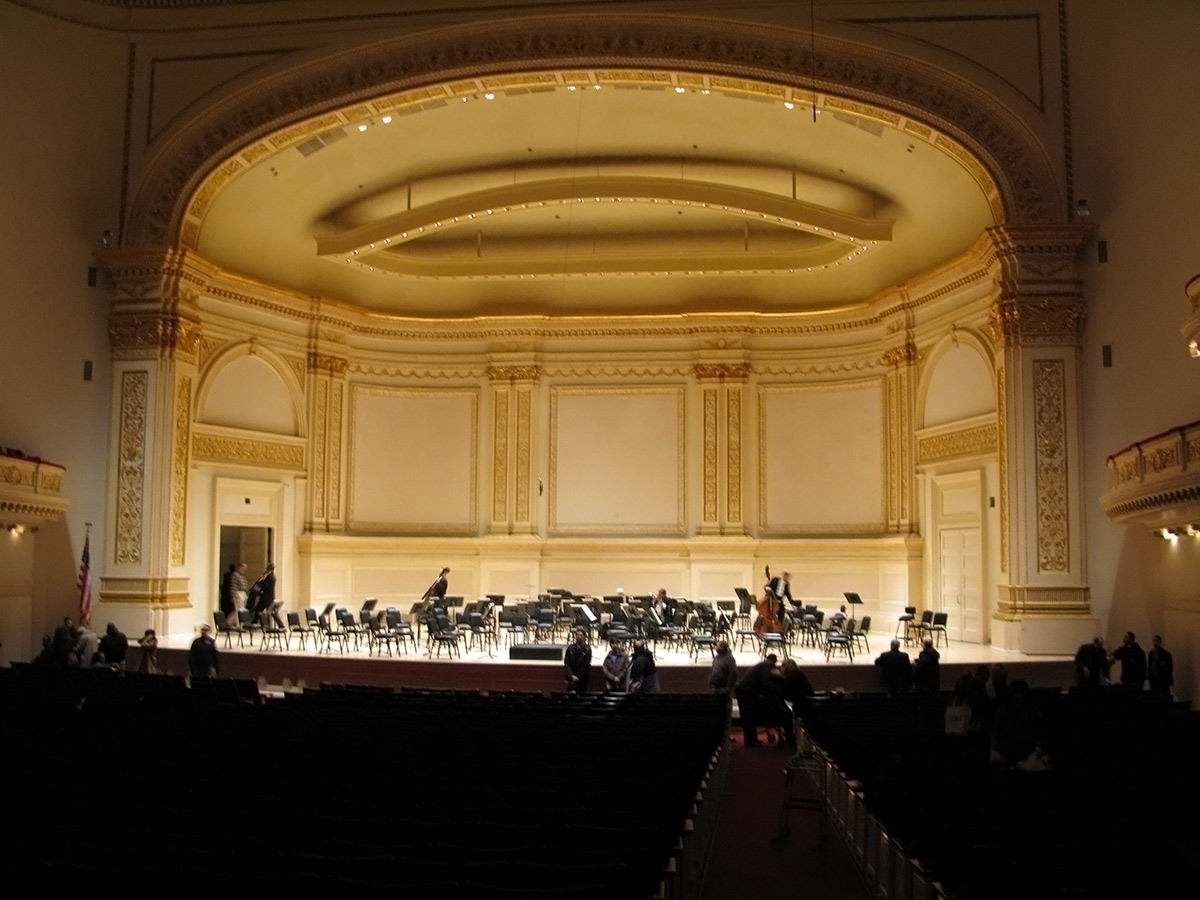
Carnegie Hall, New York City Carnegie-hall-isaac-stern

Néstor also performed regularly on the NBC radio network during this time. He first concertized at the historic Town Hall in New York City in 1945 and returned for a repeat performance three years later. Subsequently, he collaborated once again with Alfredo Antonini conducting the New York Philharmonic for a gala Night of the Americas concert at Carnegie Hall in 1946.

Based upon these achievements, an extensive array of international concerts emerged which included an appearance with the Montreal Philharmonic Orchestra in Canada in 1946. While concertizing in South America he performed in Peru, Columbia, Venezuela, Chile and Argentina. He also returned to Mexico to perform for President Miguel Alemán Valdés in 1947 and was also featured in May 1947 at a reception held for President Aleman at the Waldorf-Astoria Hotel in New York City. In 1949 he joined forces with the Chicago Opera House and concertized throughout Europe in France, Sweden, Holland, Norway, Denmark, England and Spain. During this time Chayres was represented by the prestigious impresario Sol Hurok In Madrid, he performed the Seven Songs of Manuel de Falla to great acclaim. His final tour in the United States and Canada was completed in 1950. Upon returning to Mexico City, he married his wife Peggy Satanon who "discovered" Cháyres during a recital at the Palace of Fine Arts.

In 1951, Néstor's artistic career was interrupted by the tragic death of his mother in an automobile accident. Cháyres suspended his concert appearances for over ten years but did appear in the movie Cuando me vaya in 1954 in collaboration with the such as actors as Libertad Lamarque, Miguel Torruco, Julián de Meriche and fellow vocalists Juan Arvizu and Alfonso Ortiz Tirado. This film biography of the Mexican songwriter María Grever earned two Ariel Awards in Mexico in 1955. He returned to television in 1968 for an appearance in the Paco Malgesto Hour and in 1969 on The Golden Hour of the W. His final appearance on television occurred in 1970 on the show 24 Hours.

=== Performance style ===
External images
- Photograph of Nestor Chayres for "Viva America" on CBS Radio in 1946; Here on Getty images
- Photograph of Nestor Chayres and Manolita Arriola for "Viva America" on CBS Radio in 1946; Here on Getty Images

During the course of his professional career, critics in Billboard magazine applauded Néstor Mesta Cháyres for a powerful, exciting and dramatic delivery which pleased his audiences. He was also commended for the warmth and tenderness of his renditions. Critics also took note of his fine and full tenor voice and his capacity to interpret Mexican-gypsy folk melodies with fire and passion. His powerful voice and expansive vocal range could even be heard outside the theater and often moved his audiences to tears.

Néstor Mesta Cháyres' artistic interpretations of such songs as Murcia, Toledo, Clavel Sevilliano, Granda and the Suite Español by Agustín Lara earned him the beloved title - "El Gitano de Mexico" ("The Gyspy of Mexico"). He was often compared favorably to the outstanding lyric tenors of his time including: Juan Arvizu, Luise G. Roldán and Alfonso Ortiz Tirado and Tito Schipa.

=== Death ===
Néstor Mesta Cháyres passed away during 1971 in Mexico City after suffering a heart attack at the age of 63. His musical legacy includes an extensive collection of recordings of the works of Agustín Lara and María Grever.

== Discography ==
=== Albums ===
- Nestor Chaires - RCA de Venezuela - Néstor Cháyres performing in Caracas, Venezuela (1965?) List of musical selections: Somos Differentes, Hoy No Quisiera Vivir, Rocio, Por Eso Si Te Digo, Asi, No Espero Nada de Ti
- Nestor Chayres Canta - SMC-Proarte - Néstor Cháyres with the Alfredo Mendez Orchestra performing songs by Agustín Lara (196?) List of musical selections: Arráncame la Vida - Agustín Lara, Farolito - Agustín Lara, Santa - Agustín Lara, Pregon de las Flores - Agustín Lara, Mirame - Agustín Lara, Mi Rival - Agustín Lara, Españolerias - Agustín Lara, Piensa En Mi - Agutín Lara
- Nestor Chayres - Romantic Songs of Latin America - Decca Records (catalogue # A 507) - Néstor Cháyres with the Alfredo Antonini Orchestra (1947,1950) List of musical selections: La Morena de mi Copla - Carlos Castellano Gómez, Lamento Gitano - María Grever, Granada - Agustín Lara, Noche de Ronda - Agustín Lara, El Relicario- José Padilla Sanchez, Oración Caribe - Agustín Lara, Princesita - José Padilla Sanchez, Ay, Ay, Ay - Osmán Pérez Freire
- Seven Spanish Folk Songs - Kingsway - Néstor Cháyres with the pianist Fritz Kramer performing music by Manuel de Falla (195?) List of musical selections: El Paño Moruno - Manuel de Falla, Seguidilla Murciano - Manuel de Falla, Asturiana - Manuel de Falla, Jota - Manuel de Falla, Nana - Manuel de Falla, Cancion - Manuel de Falla, Polo - Manuel de Falla, Mi Pobre Reja - Spanish folk song, Del Cabello mas Sutil - Spanish fok song, La Partida - Spanish folk song, Copla - Spanish folk song, Clavelitos - Spanish folk song, Mi Maja - Spanish folk song, A Granada - Spanish folk song, Hableme de Amores - Spanish folk song, Grandinas - Spanish folk songs

=== Singles ===
External audio
- You may listen to Néstor Mesta Cháyres performing "Campanitas en mi Alma" with the Henri Rene Orchestra in 1949; Here on DAHR

- Alma Mia - RCA Victor (Catalogue # 23-1232-B) Nestor Chayres and the Orquesta de Henri Rene perform the song by Maria Grever (19??)
- Buenas Noches Mi Amor - Néstor Cháyres y El Trio del Mar - Néstor Cháyres performs song with a chorus and orchestra.
- Cara Piccina - Victor (Catalogue # 25-7092-B) Nestor Chayres and orchestra perform the song (19??)
- Cuando Vuelva A Tu Lado - Néstor Mesta Cháyres performs this song by María Grever with organ, piano and orchestra
- El Relicario - Decca (Catalogue # 50017 A) - Nestor Chayres and the Alfredo Antonini Orchestra perform the song by Jose Padilla Sanches (19??)
- Gitanillo - Victor (catalogue # 23-1379) - Nestor Chayres performs the Paso Doble song (1949)
- Granada - Decca (Catalogue # 23770 A) - Néstor Cháyres and the Alfredo Antonini Orchestra performs song by Agustín Lara (1946)
- Hoy No Quisiera Vivir - Victor (Catalogue # 23-0956-A) Nestor Chayres and La Orquesta de La Radio Caracas perform this song by Avelino Munez (19??)
- Hoy No Quisiera Vivir- Victor (Catalogue # 23-0956) - Nestor Chayres performs the bolero with the Radio Caracas Orchestra (1948)
- La Guapa - RCA Victor (Catalogue # 23-1349-A) Nestor Chayres and Orquesta Gonzalo Cervera perform a paso doble by Luis Arcaraz (19??)
- La Morena De Me Copla - Decca (Catalogue # 50015 A) - Nestor Chayres and the Alfredo Antonini Orchesatra perform the song by Carlos Castellano ( 19??)
- La Vida Castiga - Victor (Catalogue # 23-0787-B) Nestor Chayres and orchestra perform the song by A. Mucieste (19??)

External audio
- You may listen to Néstor Mesta Cháyres performing "Lamento Gitano" with John Serry Sr. and the Alfredo Antonini Orchestra in 1946 Here on DAHR

- Lamento Gitano - Decca (Catalogue # 50015) - Nestor Chayres and the Alfredo Antonini Orchestra (195?)
- Libreme Dios - Victor (Catalog #23-1027) - Nestor Chayres performs the bolero - Record review (1949)
- Macarenas - RCA Victor (Catalogue # 23-5347-A) - Nestor Chayres and the Vier Fidazzini Orchestra performing the bolero (19??)
- Manolete - RCA Victor (Catalogue # 23-0853-A) - Néstor Cháyres and Orchestra Radio Caracas performs song (Paso Doble) by Manuel Álvarez Maciste (194?)
- Mucho Mas - Victor (Catalog #23-1027) - Nestor Chayres performs the rumba bolero by María Grever - Record review (1949)
- Ni de Día, Ni de Noche - Barcelona Company of Gramophone Odeon (# OKA 1526) - Néstor Cháyres performs song by María Grever with orchestra (1950)
- No Espero Nada De Ti - Victor (Catalogue # 23-1315-B) Nestor Chayres sings this beguine by Maria Grever.(19??)
- No Te Vayas - Victor (Catalogue # 23-0899) - Record review - Nestor Chayres performs the balad with the Radio Caracas Orchestra (1948)
- Noche de Mar - Barcelona Company of Gramophone Odeon (Catalogue # OKA 1525) - Néstor Cháyres performs song by José Reyna with orchestra (1950)
- Noche de Ronda - Decca (Catalogue # 23770 B) - Néstor Cháyres and the Alfredo Antonini Orchestra performs song by Agustín Lara (1946)
- Oracion Caribe - Decca (Catalogue # 50017) - Nestor Chayres and the Alfredo Antonini Orchestra perform the song by Agustín Lara (19??)

External audio
- You may listen to Néstor Mesta Cháyres performing "Por Eso Si Te Digo" with La Orquesta de La Radio Caracas in 1946; Here on DAHR

- Pobre Corazon - Victor (Catalogue # 23-0899) - Record review - Nestor Chayres performs the bolero with the Radio Caracas Orchestra (1948)
- Por Eso Si Te Digo - Victor (Catalogue # 23-0956) - Record review - Nestor Chayres performs the bolero with the Radio Caracas Orchestra (1948)
- Por Eso Si Te Digo - Victor (Catalogue # 23-0956-B) Nestor Chayres and La Orquesta de La Radio Caracas perform this song by Lois Blou (19??)
- Porque Te Quiero - RCA Victor (Catalogue # 23-1349-B) Nestor Chayres and La Orquesta Gonzalo Cervera perform this paso doble (19??)
- Princesita - RCA Victor (Catalogue # 90-0595-A) - Néstor Cháyres and Isidor Handler Orchestra performs song by M. E. Palomero (1947)
- Qué Me Importa - Barcelona Company of Gramophone Odeon (# OKA 1527) - Néstor Cháyres performs song by Mario Fernández Porta with orchestra (1949)
- Rayito De Luna - RCA Victor (Catalogue # 23-1232-A) Nestor Chayres and Orquesta De Henri Rene perform this song by Chucho Navarro (19??)
- Rocio - Victor (Catalogue # 23-1379) - Nestor Chayres performs the Paso Doble song (1949)
- Silverio - Barcelona Company of Gramophone Odeon (Catalogue # OKA 1528) - Néstor Cháyres performs song by Agustín Lara with orchestra (1949)
- Silverio - RCA Victor (Catalogue # 23-0853-B) - Néstor Cháyres with the Orchestra Radio Caracas performs song (Paso Doble) by Agustín Lara (194?)
- Te Espero - Victor (Catalogue # 90-0599-B) - Nestor Chayres and Orchestra performing this song (19??)
- Todo Mi Ser - RCA Victor (Catalogue # 90-0595-B) - Néstor Cháyres and Isidor Handler Orchestra performs song (Bolero) by María Grever (1947)

== Filmography ==
- Cuando me vaya (1954) - Néstor Chaires as himself
- O Grande Amor De María Grever 1954 Leg - Néstor Chayres as himself in performance

== Archived works ==
- Recordings by Nestor Mesta Chayres in The Discography of American Historical Recordings. Here on DAHR

- The Discography of American Historical Recordings catalog at the University of California at Santa Barbara includes selected recordings by Nestor Mesta Chayres for the RCA Victor and Decca labels from the 1940s and 1950s.

== Bibliography ==
- Enciclopèdia Espasa - Annual supplements 1971-72, pages 215-16 (ISBN 84-239-4600-2)
- Media Sound & Culture in Latin America. Editors: Bronfman, Alejanda & Wood, Andrew Grant. University of Pittsburgh Press, Pittsburgh, PA, USA, 2012, Pg. 49 ISBN 978-0-8229-6187-1
- Encyclopedia of Latin American Music in New York Figueroa, Frank M. Pillar Publications, September 1, 1994 p. 80
