= Luisa Fernandez =

Spanish-born, Germany based pop singer

Luisa Fernández
- Born: August 14, 1961 (age 65); Vigo, Spain
- Genres: Pop, Disco
- Occupation: singer

Luisa Fernández (born 14 August 1961) is a Spanish-born, Mexico-based pop singer. She is perhaps best known for her hit single, "Lay Love on You" from 1978.

== Career ==
She was born in Vigo, Spain, but moved to México as a child. She later married singer/producer Peter Kent, who was also popular during the disco era.

== Singles ==
- "Lay love on you" GER #8 Spa #1
- "Give love a second chance" GER #11
- "Granada"
- "Stop 1978"
- "Cool it baby"
- "Make me feel alright"
- "I love to love you"
- "Dance, baby dance around"
- "Don't wait too long"
