= La Cadena de las Américas =

Radio station

La Cadena de Las Américas
- Type: Subsidiary of the Columbia Broadcasting System
- Industry: Radio broadcasting
- Predecessor: Columbia Broadcasting System
- Founded: 1941; 85 years ago (established at CBS)
- Defunct: October 10, 1949; 77 years ago
- Fate: Acquired by Voice of America
- Successor: Voice of America
- Headquarters: New York City, U.S.
- Area served: International
- Key people: William S. Paley; Edmund Chester; Paul White; Nelson Rockefeller

La Cadena de las Américas, also known as CBS Network of the Americas, was an international nonprofit radio broadcasting network which was established through the cooperative efforts of the United States Office of the Coordinator of Inter-American Affairs (OCIAA) and the Columbia Broadcasting System (CBS) in an effort to support President Franklin Delano Roosevelt's cultural diplomacy initiatives throughout both North and South America during World War II. It served as an early example of the use of soft power by the United States.

== History ==
=== Founding ===
Founded in 1941, La Cadena de las Américas was established in New York City within the broadcast studios of CBS. It was the culmination of a collaboration between CBS's President William S. Paley, and the journalists Paul White and Edmund Chester to provide timely vital news services and cultural programing while also counteracting the influence of Nazi propaganda in Latin America during World War II. In Chester's words, the objective was to "send news programs that present an accurate picture of the day's developments, [and] cultural shows that present the people of the US as romantics with souls, not as cogs in the national industrial machine".

The high quality standards of the network's varied programing were monitored and supervised by a youthful Nelson Rockefeller within Roosevelt's recently created OCIAA in an effort to implement a national foreign policy of Pan-Americanism.

The integrated multimedia network utilized both shortwave transmissions of CBS' programs along with brief timely newscasts which were transmitted over radiotelephone. At its inception, the network integrated over 46 long-wave outlets and 30 short-wave outlets in Latin America. Due to its widespread popularity, by the end of 1945 it consisted of over 100 affiliated stations located in 20 Latin-American nations for listeners from Mexicali to Cape Horn utilizing 3.5 million receivers.

=== Programming ===
In addition to providing timely and accurate news coverage of World War II by seasoned journalists such as Paul White and Edmund Chester, the network called upon the talents of several noted international musicians to provide a wide range of cultural programing for radio listeners in both North and South America. As part of this effort, CBS reconfigured its permanent in-house orchestra under the direction of the conductor Alfredo Antonini to form the CBS Pan America Orchestra, which was featured on the network's Viva America program during the war. The network's broadcasts showcased authentic performances by internationally acclaimed musicians, composers and arrangers including: Juan Arvizu (Mexico), Manolita Arriola (Mexico), Nestor Mesta Chayres (Mexico), Roberto Fontaina (Uruuay), Eva Garza (Mexico), Elsa Miranda (Puerto Rico), Los Panchos Trio (Mexico), John Serry (United States of America), and Terig Tucci (Argentina).

During World War II, programming which originated on La Cadena de las Américas was also rebroadcast for the benefit of members of America's armed forces in Europe over the Armed Forces Network.

=== International recognition ===
Broadcasts in support of democratic ideals on La Cadena de las Américas attracted the attention and recognition of a variety of leaders from around the world within the realms of diplomacy and entertainment. They included vocalists, actors and actresses from the Golden Age of Hollywood including Ronald Colman, Rita Hayworth, Edward G. Robinson, Kate Smith and Pat O'Brien. During its inaugural broadcast in 1942, the network's support of democratic ideals was also acknowledged by the Vice President of the United States Henry A. Wallace as well by several South American diplomates including: Alfredo Baldomir (President of Uruguay) Manuel Prado (President of Peru), Juan Antonio Rios (President of Chile), as well as the Presidents of Nicaragua and Venezuela. In 1943, the Consul General of Cuba Roberto Fernandez acknowledged the network's important role in promoting a greater understanding between the people of Cuba and United States by awarding Cuba's highest civilian decoration (the Carlos Manuel De Cespedes National Order of Merit) to William S. Paley and Edmund Chester.

=== Post war era ===
Paley noted that the CBS network assumed considerable financial obligations while operating his nonprofit network during World War II. In an effort to address this problem during the post-World War II era, supervision of La Cadena de las Américas was slowly transferred from the CBS network to the United States Department of State's Voice of America system. As foreign policy objectives shifted toward the reconstruction of Europe later in the decade, the CBS network withdrew its support of the short-wave network to South America while simultaneously enhancing its commercial presence in the region.

== See also ==
- Culture during the Cold War
- Golden Age of Radio
