= Manolita Arriola =

Mexican singer and actress (1919–2004)

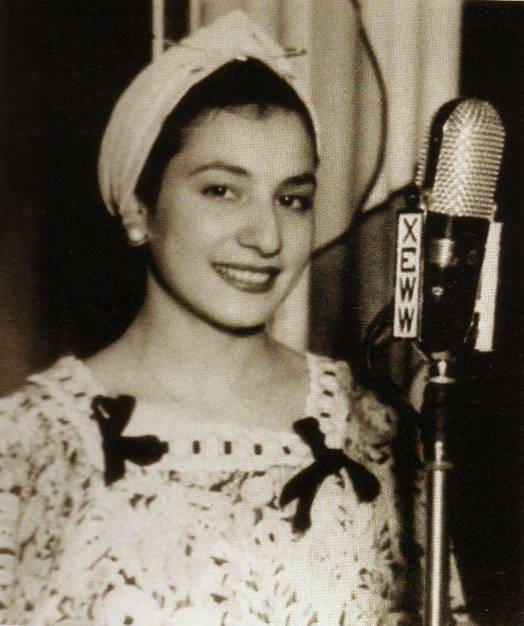
Arriola in the 1940s

Manuela "Manolita" (or "Manuelita") Arriola Rubio (sometimes spelled Arreola; 6 March 1919 in El Rosario – 27 November 2004 in Mexico City) was a Mexican singer and actress. Known for her versatility as a singer, she was nicknamed La Versátil (The Versatile Woman).

== Biography ==
External images
- Photograph of Manolita Arriola and Nestor Chayres on Viva América in 1946; Here on Getty images
- Photograph of Manolita Arriola and Los Panchos Trio oon Viva América in 1946; Here on Getty Images

Manolita Arriola recorded more than 150 songs in various genres, such as ranchera, bolero, corrido, tropical, and tango. She was the first performer of the famous Pedro Flores bolero "Amor perdido". She recorded for the RCA Víctor, Peerless, Columbia, and Coro labels. She also collaborated with the noted Mexican tenor Nestor Mesta Chayres and the Los Panchos Trio for CBS Radio on La Cadena de las Américas (Network of the Americas) for the Viva América program in 1946.

== Discography ==
=== Compilation albums ===
- Serenata tropical (Eco Records, 1967)
- Boleros del recuerdo (Coro Records, 1967)
- Manolita Arreola (Eco Records, 1974)
