= Terig Tucci =

Argentine musician (1897–1973)

- Terig Tucci
- Born: June 23, 1897; Buenos Aires, Argentina
- Died: February 28, 1973 (aged 93); Buenos Aires, Argentina
- Resting place: Long Island, United States
- Occupations: Composer, Orchestrator; Violinist, Pianist, Mandolinist, Conductor
- Years active: 1917-1967

Terig Tucci (June 23, 1897 – February 28, 1973) was an Argentine composer, orchestrator, conductor, violinist, pianist, and mandolinist. He was a leading advocate of music for the tango in the United States who collaborated with the singer Carlos Gardel.

== Biography ==
Tucci was born in Buenos Aires, Argentina in 1897. His first composition, "Cariños de madre" was performed for a zarzuela at the Avenida Theatre in 1917. Following a career as a violinist in local cinema orchestras, he left for New York City in 1923.

From 1930 to 1941 he performed for NBC Radio as a member of the NBC Orchestra under the direction of Hugo Mariani. The RCA Victor recording label named Tucci as its executive producer of their lucrative Latin American music unit in 1932. In 1934 he collaborated as an orchestrator with his fellow countryman Carlos Gardel as part of the tango vocalist's contract with Paramount Pictures in their Astoria, Queens studios. Tucci also served as both a close friend to Gardel as well as his musical scribe during the early 1930s. He also played mandolin in a trio with Adolfo Mejía Navarro on guitar and Antonio Francés on lute.

While remaining at the helm of RCA Victor's Latin unit, Tucci was appointed to the post of musical director for the new Latin American Network La Cadena de las Americas at CBS Radio in 1941. In this post he also served as the lead music arranger for CBS' Pan American Symphony Orchestra from 1940 to 1949 where he collaborated with the accordionist John Serry Sr. and the conductor Alfredo Antonini on the radio program Viva America. During this tenure at CBS in New York City, he also collaborated with singers Juan Arvizu, Nestor Mesta Chayres and Elsa Miranda. In 1942 he emerged as the musical director and performer in daily concerts for the Macy's Latin-American Exposition in New York City under the patronage of Eleanor Roosevelt, Mrs. Henry A. Wallace and ambassadors from throughout South America. In addition, while orchestrating music for CBS's La Cadena de las Americas Orchestra, he collaborated with the actress Eusebia Cosme from 1943 until 1946. He also performed for General Electric from 1941 to 1947, and subsequently for the Voice of America network, from 1951 until 1959. During the 1950s he also composed music for documentaries and radio programs at the United Nations in New York City.

External audio
- You may hear Terig Tucci performing Chucho Martinez's bolero Bendicion with the vocalist Alfredo Gil and the Columbia Broadcasting System Orchestra (CBS) in 1947 Here

Later in life, Tucci continued to compose and arrange music which was enjoyed by audiences even in South America. In 1967 he was commissioned by the Asociacion Venezolana de Artistas de le Escena to compose a work for the Caracas Festival of Music in celebration of the fourth centenary of the founding of the city of Caracas. The work featured a tenor accompanied by women's voices and orchestra.

Tucci led his tango orchestra in numerous RCA recordings, including "My Buenos Aires" in 1958. He retired from RCA Victor in 1964. In 1969, Tucci wrote a reflection on Gardel's last days, Gardel en Nueva York. He lived out his own final years in his Forest Hills, Queens home.

== Death ==
Tucci died during a visit to Buenos Aires in 1973 and was buried on Long Island.

== Archived works ==
- The Discography of American Historical Recordings catalog at the University of California at Santa Barbara includes several master recordings of performances and compositions by Terig Tucci on the Victor, Columbia and Brunswick labels from the years 1933-1954 which are accessible online.
