= Jorge del Moral =

Jorge del Moral Ugarte (23 December 1900 in Mexico City – 1941) was a Mexican concert pianist and songwriter.

== Songs ==
- Besos robados
- Tu imposible amor
- Nunca Digas
