= Alfonso Ortiz Tirado =

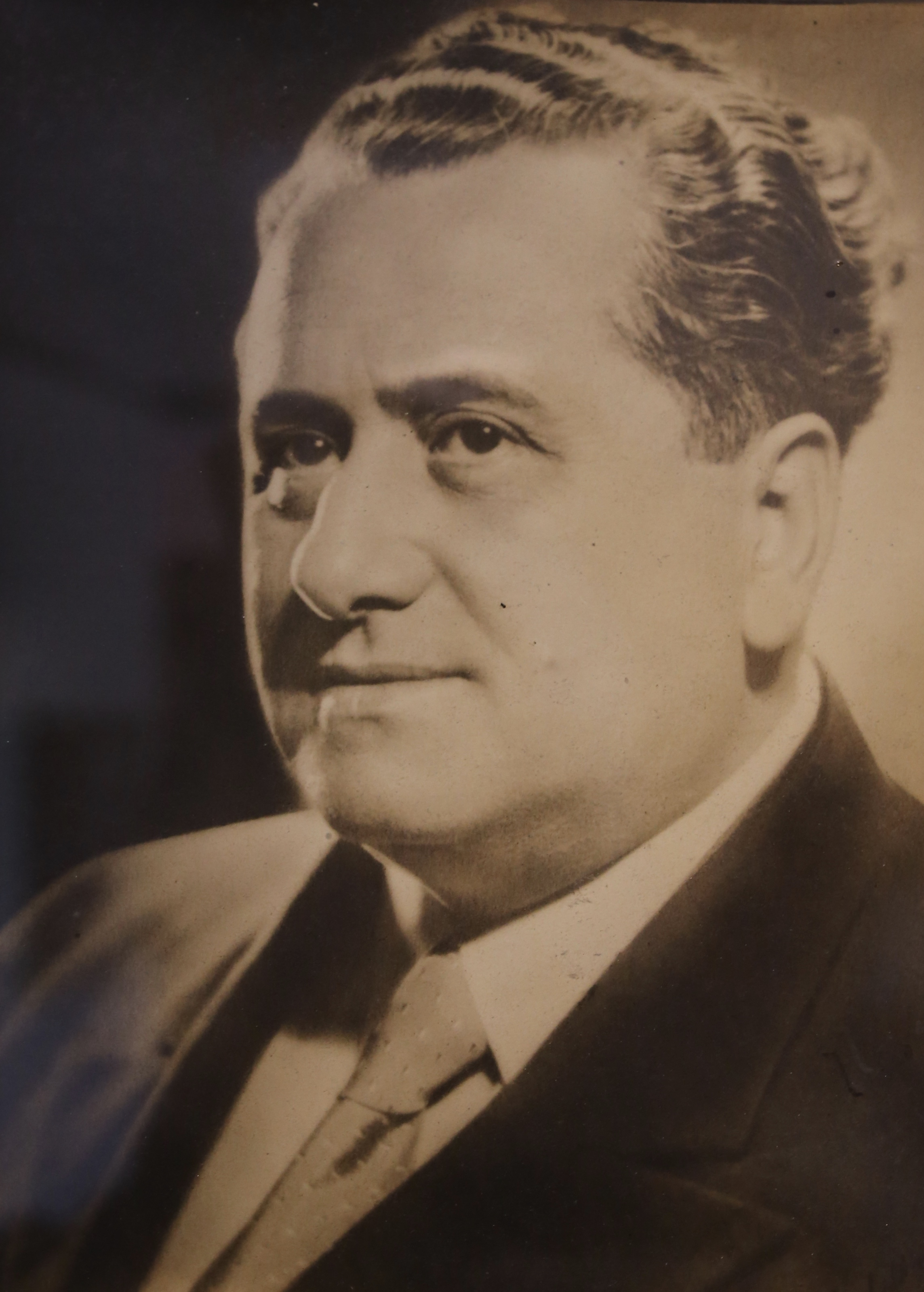
- Dr. Alfonso Ortiz Tirado, undated.

Background information
- Born: Alfonso Ortiz Tirado; January 24, 1893; Álamos, Sonora, Mexico
- Origin: Mexico
- Died: September 7, 1960 (aged 67) Mexico City, Mexico
- Genres: Classical, opera
- Occupations: Tenor, physician
- Instrument: Voice
- Years active: 1920s–1950s

Alfonso Ortiz Tirado (Álamos, Sonora, 24 January 1893 – Mexico City, 7 September 1960) was an opera singer and medical doctor. His musical talent was apparently evident early in life, but he studied at the Escuela Nacional Preparatoria and university to become a doctor. He specialized in gynecology as well as general medicine, and eventually became the personal physician of Frida Kahlo and performed surgery on Agustín Lara. As a musician, he studied under José Pierson and soon afterward had a successful international career as an opera singer, earning the label of "tenor of the Americas." He was often cast for productions of L'elisir d'amore and Madama Butterfly. He earned a large sum of money doing this, and used it to establish a children's hospital in Mexico City. Ortiz died in 1960, and was interred at the Panteón Francés de la Piedad. The Festival de Canto Operístico Alfonso Ortiz Tirado in the state of Sonora was named after him.
