= María Grever =

Mexican composer (1885–1951)

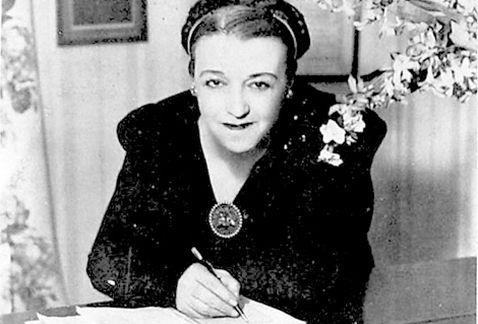
- María Grever composing music

Background information
- Also known as: María Gréver
- Born: María Joaquina de la Portilla Torres Grever; 14 September 1885; León, Guanajuato, Mexico
- Died: 15 December 1951 (aged 66) New York City, New York, U.S.
- Genres: Bolero, Film music, Jazz influences
- Occupations: Composer, Songwriter, Pianist
- Instruments: Piano, Vocals
- Years active: 1900–1951
- Label: Hudson
- Spouse: Leo A. Grever

María Grever (14 September 1885 – 15 December 1951) was the first female Mexican composer to achieve international acclaim. She is best known for the song "What A Difference A Day Makes" (originally "Cuando vuelva a tu lado"), which was popularized by Dinah Washington and has been covered by numerous artists.

== Early life ==
María Joaquina de la Portilla Torres was born to a Spanish father (Francisco de la Portilla) and Mexican mother (Julia Torres) in León, Guanajuato. For the first six years of her life she lived in Mexico City, moving to her father's natal city, Sevilla, in 1891. She studied music in France, with Claude Debussy and Franz Lenhard among her teachers. In 1900, she moved back to Mexico and continued her musical studies at her aunt's solfège school. In 1907, the then 22-year-old de la Portilla married Leo A. Grever, an American oil company executive, and in 1916 became a U.S. citizen and moved to New York City, where she lived for the rest of her life.

== Career ==
Grever wrote more than 1000 songs — the majority of them boleros — and her popularity reached audiences in Latin America, Europe, and the United States. She was said to have possessed perfect pitch and wrote most of her songs in one key. Her first piece of music, a Christmas carol, was composed when she was four years old. She wrote her first song when she was 18 years old, "A Una Ola" (To a Wave), and it sold three million copies.

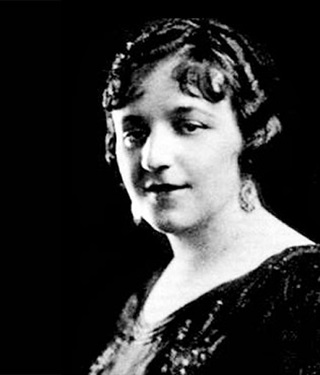
Photo of María Grever, a renowned Mexican composer known for her popular songs such as "What a Difference a Day Makes" (originally "Cuando vuelva a tu lado").

In 1920, she began work as a film composer for Paramount Pictures and 20th Century Fox studios. Joining ASCAP in 1935, her chief musical collaborators included Stanley Adams and Irving Caesar.

Grever once said: "I had to leave my country, and now in New York, I am interested in Jazz and Modern Rhythms, but above all, in Mexican Music, which I long to present to the American people. I am afraid they don't know much about it. It is music worth spreading; there is such a cultural richness in Mexican Music (its Hispanic and indigenous origins and how they mix) where melody and rhythm merge. It is my wish and yearning to present the native rhythms and tunes (of Mexico) from a real perspective, but with the necessary flexibility to appeal to the universal audience."

External audio
- You may listen to Grever's Todo Mi Ser as sung by Nestor Mesta Chayres in 1947 here

Grever's first international hit was "Júrame" (Promise Me), a habanera-bolero interpreted in a masterly manner by tenor José Mojica. Other hits continued to follow, such as "Volveré" (I Will Return); "Te quiero dijiste" (I love you, you said), written for the 1944 Esther Williams film Bathing Beauty, as well as "Cuando vuelva a tu lado" (When I Return To Your Side as recorded by Nestor Mesta Chayres) and "Por si no te vuelvo a ver" (In case I don't see you again). Other songs of hers include "Tipitipitin" (recorded as "Ti-Pi-Tin" by the Andrews Sisters), "Para Qué Recordar", "Ya No Me Quieres", "Tú, Tú y Tú" (as recorded by Mexican tenor Juan Arvizu in 1928), "Que Dirías de Mí", "Eso Es Mentíra", "Mi Secreto", "Dame Tu Amor", "Una Rosa, Un Beso", "Despedida", "Así", "Chamaca Mía", "Todo Mi Ser", and "Alma Mía".

== Death ==
Grever died in 1951 in New York after a prolonged illness. At her request, her remains were transported to Mexico City.

== Posthumous tributes and success ==
Her songs have been covered internationally by a variety of artists:

- In 1953, Argentine singer-actress and Latin American star Libertad Lamarque portrayed Grever in Cuando me vaya (When I Leave), a biopic directed by Tito Davison. Three years later, Lamarque released a best-selling tribute to Grever's most popular songs titled Libertad Lamarque canta canciones de Maria Grever.
- In 1959, Dinah Washington recorded "Cuando vuelva a tu lado" under the title "What A Difference A Day Makes" with English lyrics. The recording won a Grammy Award in 1959, and in 1998 it was inducted into the Grammy Hall of Fame.
- In 1964, operatic tenor Alfredo Kraus recorded "Júrame" on his album "Siboney."
- In 2018, operatic soprano, Ailyn Perez performed "Júrame" live for WFMT in Chicago.
- On 11 February 2021, Google celebrated her with a Google Doodle.
