= Harry Kramer (announcer) =

American radion and television announcer

Harry Kramer (February 9, 1911, in Philadelphia, Pennsylvania – January 23, 1996, in Sarasota, Florida) was an American radio and television announcer, better known as the "Voice of CBS News."

== Biography ==
Kramer was an announcer with CBS in New York for 30 years, starting in the early 1940s. His radio credits included News of the World, Viva América, and Hearthstone of the Death Squad. On television, Kramer was an announcer on the 1951 version of Winner Take All, but his main fame came from two places: first, his stint as announcer for the daytime soap opera The Edge of Night between 1957 and 1972; and secondly, his run as announcer on the CBS Evening News with Walter Cronkite from 1962 to 1971. Kramer was also announcer for coverage of political conventions, space launches, assassinations, and other major stories that unfolded during that period. His run as announcer for CBS ended around the time he was succeeded as The Edge of Night announcer by Hal Simms, and as CBS Evening News announcer by Bob Hite.

== Death ==
Following a short illness, Kramer died in Sarasota, Florida on January 23, 1996 at the age of eighty-four.
