= List of number-one songs from the 1950s (Mexico) =

The following article lists the monthly number-one songs on the Mexican Selecciones Musicales chart from January 1950 to December 1960. The source for these charts is the book Musicosas: manual del comentarista de radio y televisión by Roberto Ayala, who was the director of the Selecciones Musicales magazine. These charts were based on nationwide record sales, jukebox plays, radio and television airplay, and sheet music sales. (Note: (Translated from Spanish) "Record agencies all over the country, jukebox operators, music publishers, recording houses and correspondents for Selecciones Musicales send local reports every week. In the headquarters, each one of those reports is assessed and by means of a scoreboard each song is rated so as to determine the position that it is to occupy on the "Hit Parade".)

As published in the Musicosas book, the charts only include the song titles and the names of the composers; the performers credited in this article are included for reference and where many performers are listed for the same song, they appear in alphabetical order, which may not reflect whose version was the most popular (Note: While many times, like in other countries, a song would be popularized by one particular performer and it became identified with them, in Mexico it was common practice in the 1940s and 50s for a song to be recorded by various singers from different record labels around the same time; therefore, this article may not include all of the performers who recorded the songs around that period.).

The longest-running number-one song of the decade was "Usted", written by Gabriel Ruiz and José Antonio Zorrilla and recorded by Los Tres Diamantes, which spent six consecutive months at the number-one position from May to October 1951.

== 1950 ==
Issue date	Song	Composer	Artist(s)
January	"Tú, sólo tú"	Felipe Valdés Leal	Pedro Infante / Beny Moré / Trío Calaveras
February	"Tú, sólo tú"	Felipe Valdés Leal	Pedro Infante / Beny Moré / Trío Calaveras
March	"La múcura"	Antonio Fuentes	Beny Moré con la Orquesta de Pérez Prado / Trío Los Panchos
April	"Pobre corazón"	Chucho Monge	Pedro Infante
May	"Pobre corazón"	Chucho Monge	Pedro Infante
June	"Qué rico mambo"	Dámaso Pérez Prado	Pérez Prado y su Orquesta
July	"Viajera"	Luis Arcaraz	Luis Arcaraz y su Orquesta
August	"Quinto patio"	Luis Arcaraz	Luis Arcaraz y su Orquesta
September	"Quinto patio"	Luis Arcaraz	Luis Arcaraz y su Orquesta
October	"Soy feliz"	Juan Bruno Tarraza	María Victoria con Orquesta de Luis Arcaraz
November	"Soy feliz"	Juan Bruno Tarraza	María Victoria con Orquesta de Luis Arcaraz
December	"Ella"	José Alfredo Jiménez	Miguel Aceves Mejía / Pedro Infante

Source: Ayala, R. (1962) Musicosas: manual del comentarista de radio y televisión, pp. 303-306.

== 1951 ==
Issue date	Song	Composer(s)	Artist(s)
January	"El fronterizo"	Los Cuates Castilla (Note: Artistic name of siblings Miguel Angel and José Angel Díaz y González de Castilla.)	Pedro Infante
February	"El fronterizo"	Los Cuates Castilla	Pedro Infante
March	"Ella"	José Alfredo Jiménez	Miguel Aceves Mejía / Pedro Infante
April	"Ella"	José Alfredo Jiménez	Miguel Aceves Mejía / Pedro Infante
May	"Usted"	Gabriel Ruiz & José Antonio Zorrilla	Los Tres Diamantes
June	"Usted"	Gabriel Ruiz & José Antonio Zorrilla	Los Tres Diamantes
July	"Usted"	Gabriel Ruiz & José Antonio Zorrilla	Los Tres Diamantes
August	"Usted"	Gabriel Ruiz & José Antonio Zorrilla	Los Tres Diamantes
September	"Usted"	Gabriel Ruiz & José Antonio Zorrilla	Los Tres Diamantes
October	"Usted"	Gabriel Ruiz & José Antonio Zorrilla	Los Tres Diamantes
November	"Cuando el destino"	José Alfredo Jiménez	Miguel Aceves Mejía / Pedro Infante
December	"Carta a Eufemia"	Rubén Fuentes & Rubén Méndez	Pedro Infante

Source: Ayala, R. (1962) Musicosas: manual del comentarista de radio y televisión, pp. 307-310.

== 1952 ==
Issue date	Song	Composer(s)	Artist(s)
January	"Carta a Eufemia"	Rubén Fuentes & Rubén Méndez	Pedro Infante
February	"Carta a Eufemia"	Rubén Fuentes & Rubén Méndez	Pedro Infante
March	"Amor, qué malo eres"	Luis Marquetti	Lucho Gatica / Los Tres Diamantes / Pedro Vargas
April	"El plebeyo"	Felipe Pinglo Alva	Fernando Fernández / Pedro Infante
May	"El plebeyo"	Felipe Pinglo Alva	Fernando Fernández / Pedro Infante
June	"Nube gris"	Eduardo Márquez Talledo	Pedro Infante
July	"Peso sobre peso"	Chava Flores	Pedro Infante
August	"Peso sobre peso"	Chava Flores	Pedro Infante
September	"Pénjamo"	Rubén Méndez	Pedro Infante
October	"Pénjamo"	Rubén Méndez	Pedro Infante
November	"Pénjamo"	Rubén Méndez	Pedro Infante
December	"Tu recuerdo y yo"	José Alfredo Jiménez	Miguel Aceves Mejía / Pedro Infante

Source: Ayala, R. (1962) Musicosas: manual del comentarista de radio y televisión, pp. 310-313.

== 1953 ==
Issue date	Song	Composer(s)	Artist(s)
January	"Tu recuerdo y yo"	José Alfredo Jiménez	Miguel Aceves Mejía / Pedro Infante
February	"Tu recuerdo y yo"	José Alfredo Jiménez	Miguel Aceves Mejía / Pedro Infante
March	"Piel canela"	Bobby Capó	Bobby Capó con la Sonora Matancera / Lucho Gatica / Pedro Vargas
April	"Piel canela"	Bobby Capó	Bobby Capó con la Sonora Matancera / Lucho Gatica / Pedro Vargas
May	"El jinete"	José Alfredo Jiménez	Jorge Negrete
June	"El jinete"	José Alfredo Jiménez	Jorge Negrete
July	"Anna (El Negro Zumbón)"	R. Vatro	Pérez Prado y su Orquesta / Flo Sandon's
August	"Candilejas"	Charles Chaplin (Note: Spanish lyrics by Mario Molina Montes.)	Los Tecolines
September	"Candilejas"	Charles Chaplin	Los Tecolines
October	"Candilejas"	Charles Chaplin	Los Tecolines
November	"Vaya con Dios"	Larry Russell, Inez James & Buddy Pepper	Pedro Infante / Nat King Cole
December	"Ruega por nosotros"	Alberto Cervantes & Rubén Fuentes	Miguel Aceves Mejía / Lucho Gatica / Pedro Infante

Source: Ayala, R. (1962) Musicosas: manual del comentarista de radio y televisión, pp. 314-317.

== 1954 ==
Issue date	Song	Composer(s)	Artist(s)
January	"Ruega por nosotros"	Alberto Cervantes & Rubén Fuentes	Miguel Aceves Mejía / Lucho Gatica / Pedro Infante
February	"Ruega por nosotros"	Alberto Cervantes & Rubén Fuentes	Miguel Aceves Mejía / Lucho Gatica / Pedro Infante
March	"Ruega por nosotros"	Alberto Cervantes & Rubén Fuentes	Miguel Aceves Mejía / Lucho Gatica / Pedro Infante
April	"Cien años"	Alberto Cervantes & Rubén Fuentes	Pedro Infante / Hermanos Martínez Gil
May	"Cien años"	Alberto Cervantes & Rubén Fuentes	Pedro Infante / Hermanos Martínez Gil
June	"Cien años"	Alberto Cervantes & Rubén Fuentes	Pedro Infante / Hermanos Martínez Gil
July	"Cien años"	Alberto Cervantes & Rubén Fuentes	Pedro Infante / Hermanos Martínez Gil
August	"Cien años"	Alberto Cervantes & Rubén Fuentes	Pedro Infante / Hermanos Martínez Gil
September	"Contigo en la distancia"	César Portillo de la Luz	Lucho Gatica / Pedro Infante / Andy Russell
October	"Tres días"	Tomás Méndez	Lola Beltrán
November	"Espinita"	Nico Jiménez	Ana María González / Virginia López / Trío Los Panchos
December	"Espinita"	Nico Jiménez	Ana María González / Virginia López / Trío Los Panchos

Source: Ayala, R. (1962) Musicosas: manual del comentarista de radio y televisión, pp. 317-321.

== 1955 ==
Issue date	Song	Composer(s)	Artist(s)
January	"Mil besos"	Ema Elena Valdelamar	María Victoria
February	"Mil besos"	Ema Elena Valdelamar	María Victoria
March	"Dime de quién es tu corazón" (Note: Usually abbreviated to "De quién es tu corazón".)	José de Jesús Morales	Los Cuatro Soles / Marilú
April	"Mi último fracaso"	Alfredo Gil	Trío Los Panchos
May	"Mi último fracaso"	Alfredo Gil	Trío Los Panchos
June	"Mi último fracaso"	Alfredo Gil	Trío Los Panchos
July	"Mi último fracaso"	Alfredo Gil	Trío Los Panchos
August	"Un mundo raro"	José Alfredo Jiménez	Pedro Infante / Trío Calaveras
September	"Rogaciano"	Valeriano Trejo	Miguel Aceves Mejía
October	"Rogaciano"	Valeriano Trejo	Miguel Aceves Mejía
November	"La enramada"	Graciela Olmos	Los Tres Ases [es]
December	"Historia de un amor"	Carlos Almarán	Libertad Lamarque / Los Tres Ases / Pérez Prado y su Orquesta / Sonora Matancera con Leo Marini

Source: Ayala, R. (1962) Musicosas: manual del comentarista de radio y televisión, pp. 321-324.

== 1956 ==
Issue date	Song	Composer(s)	Artist(s)
January	"Historia de un amor"	Carlos Almarán	Libertad Lamarque / Los Tres Ases [es] / Pérez Prado y su Orquesta / Sonora Matancera con Leo Marini
February	"Historia de un amor"	Carlos Almarán	Libertad Lamarque / Los Tres Ases [es] / Pérez Prado y su Orquesta / Sonora Matancera con Leo Marini
March	"No me platiques más" (Note: Also titled "No me platiques ya" or "No me platiques" in some releases)	Vicente Garrido	Lucho Gatica / Pedro Infante / Los Tres Ases (Note: According to the composer Vicente Garrido, Los Tres Ases were the first to make the song a success, leading Gatica and Infante to record their own versions shortly after.)
April	"No me platiques más"	Vicente Garrido	Lucho Gatica / Pedro Infante / Los Tres Ases
May	"No me platiques más"	Vicente Garrido	Lucho Gatica / Pedro Infante / Los Tres Ases
June	"Grítenme, piedras del campo"	Cuco Sánchez	Miguel Aceves Mejía / Amalia Mendoza / Rosita Quintana
July	"Estoy perdido"	Víctor Manuel Mato	Los Tres Ases
August	"Pobre gente de París"	Marguerite Monnot	Les Baxter / Édith Piaf / Los Tres Diamantes
September	"Que seas feliz"	Consuelo Velázquez	Los Tres Ases
October	"Que seas feliz"	Consuelo Velázquez	Los Tres Ases
November	"Amor mío"	Álvaro Carrillo	Lucho Gatica / Los Tres Diamantes
December	"Amor mío"	Álvaro Carrillo	Lucho Gatica / Los Tres Diamantes

Source: Ayala, R. (1962) Musicosas: manual del comentarista de radio y televisión, pp. 324-327.

== 1957 ==
Issue date	Song	Composer(s)	Artist(s)
January	"La cama de piedra"	Cuco Sánchez	Cuco Sánchez
February	"La cama de piedra"	Cuco Sánchez	Cuco Sánchez
March	"El reloj"	Roberto Cantoral	Los Tres Caballeros
April	"El reloj"	Roberto Cantoral	Los Tres Caballeros
May	"La barca"	Roberto Cantoral	Los Tres Caballeros
June	"Espérame en el cielo"	Paquito López	Lucho Gatica / Pedro Vargas / Trío Los Panchos
July	"Tú me acostumbraste"	Frank Domínguez	Olga Guillot
August	"Ay, cosita linda"	Francisco "Pacho" Galán	Pacho Galán y su Orquesta / Sonora Matancera con Carlos Argentino
September	"Ay, cosita linda"	Francisco "Pacho" Galán	Pacho Galán y su Orquesta / Sonora Matancera con Carlos Argentino
October	"Te me olvidas"	Vicente Garrido	Los Tres Caballeros
November	"Cariñito azucarado"	Enrique Cerón	Virginia López
December	"Échame a mí la culpa"	José Ángel Espinoza	Amalia Mendoza / Javier Solís

Source: Ayala, R. (1962) Musicosas: manual del comentarista de radio y televisión, pp. 328-331.

== 1958 ==
Issue date	Song	Composer(s)	Artist(s)
January	"Sabrás que te quiero"	Teddy Fregoso	Los Tres Ases [es]/ Raúl Shaw Moreno / Javier Solís
February	"Sabrás que te quiero"	Teddy Fregoso	Los Tres Ases [es]/ Raúl Shaw Moreno / Javier Solís
March	"Sabrás que te quiero"	Teddy Fregoso	Los Tres Ases [es]/ Raúl Shaw Moreno / Javier Solís
April	"Sabrás que te quiero"	Teddy Fregoso	Los Tres Ases [es]/ Raúl Shaw Moreno / Javier Solís
May	"Cuando tú me quieras"	Mario Barrios & Raúl Shaw Moreno	Los Tres Ases [es]/ Raúl Shaw Moreno / Javier Solís
June	"Cuando tú me quieras"	Mario Barrios & Raúl Shaw Moreno	Los Tres Ases [es]/ Raúl Shaw Moreno / Javier Solís
July	"Fascinación"	Fermo Dante Marchetti (Note: Spanish lyrics by Mario Molina Montes.)	Tito Guízar / Trío Hermanos Michel / Sara Montiel / Los Cuatro Hermanos Silva
August	"Regálame esta noche"	Roberto Cantoral	Los Tres Caballeros
September	"Regálame esta noche"	Roberto Cantoral	Los Tres Caballeros
October	"Corazón de melón"	Carlos Rigual	Los Hermanos Rigual
November	"Nel blu, dipinto di blu"	Franco Migliacci & Domenico Modugno	Domenico Modugno
December	"Nel blu, dipinto di blu"	Franco Migliacci & Domenico Modugno	Domenico Modugno

Source: Ayala, R. (1962) Musicosas: manual del comentarista de radio y televisión, pp. 331-334.

== 1959 ==
Issue date	Song	Composer(s)	Artist(s)
January	"Gema"	Güicho Cisneros	Los Dandys
February	"Nuestro juramento"	Benito de Jesús	Julio Jaramillo
March	"Lágrimas del alma"	Bonny Villaseñor	Miguel Aceves Mejía / Lucho Gatica / Flor Silvestre / Javier Solís
April	"Nuestro juramento"	Benito de Jesús	Julio Jaramillo
May	"Bala perdida"	Tomás Méndez	Lola Beltrán
June	"La margarita"	Mariano Mercerón	Mariano Mercerón y su Orquesta
July	"Asómate a mi alma"	Fernando Valadés	Los Tecolines / Los Tres Reyes / Virginia López / Elvira Quintana / Trío Los Astros
August	"Jacaranda"	Enrique Fabregat & Mario Molina Montes	Los Tres Ases [es]/ Trío Los Santos
September	"Jacaranda"	Enrique Fabregat & Mario Molina Montes	Los Tres Ases [es]/ Trío Los Santos
October	"Me extraña"	Luis Martínez Serrano	Los Tres Caballeros
November	"Un telegrama"	Alfredo & Gregorio García Segura	Monna Bell
December	"Qué bonito amor"	José Alfredo Jiménez	Miguel Aceves Mejía / Elvira Ríos / Flor Silvestre / Javier Solís

Source: Ayala, R. (1962) Musicosas: manual del comentarista de radio y televisión, pp. 334-338.

== 1960 ==
Issue date	Song	Composer(s)	Artist(s)
January	"Ya la pagarás"	Mario de Jesús	Virginia López
February	"Limosnero de amor"	Alberto Videz	Alberto Beltrán / Javier Solís
March	"Limosnero de amor"	Alberto Videz	Alberto Beltrán / Javier Solís
April	"Sabor a mí"	Álvaro Carrillo	Rolando Laserie / Los Tres Ases [es]
May	"Canción de Orfeo"	Luis Bonfá (Note: Spanish lyrics by Mario Molina Montes.)	Los Tres Diamantes
June	"La boa"	Félix Reina & Carlos Lico (Note: The song is based on a Cuban instrumental danzón titled "Angoa", composed by Félix Reina. The Mexican musician Carlos Lico later wrote lyrics to it and recorded it with his group, Los Pao, with the new title "La boa", which became a nationwide hit when Sonora Santanera covered it.)	Sonora Santanera
July	"La boa"	Félix Reina & Carlos Lico	Sonora Santanera
August	"Ayúdame, Dios mío"	Mario de Jesús	María Elena Sandoval
September	"Bésame y olvídame"	Beatriz Jiménez	Javier Solís
October	"Adiós"	Alfredo Carrasco	Los Tecolines
November	"La plaga"	John Marascalco & Robert Blackwell (Note: Spanish lyrics by Los Teen Tops.)	Los Teen Tops
December	"Saca la botella"	Jorge Sareli	Sonora Santanera

Source: Ayala, R. (1962) Musicosas: manual del comentarista de radio y televisión, pp. 338-341.
