= List of top-ten songs for the 1950s in Mexico =

For the monthly number-one songs of the decade, see List of number-one songs from the 1950s (Mexico).

This is a list of the 10 most popular songs in Mexico for each year between 1950 and 1960, as published in the book "El Sound Track de la vida cotidiana", by Fernando Mejía Barquera.

== Overview ==
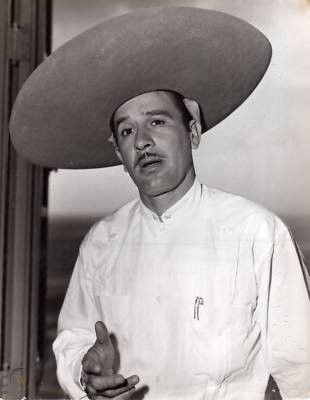
Ranchera singer and movie star Pedro Infante was the most successful performer of the 50s in Mexico; he recorded at least twenty-six of the songs that appear on the Mexican year-end charts throughout the decade until his death in 1957.

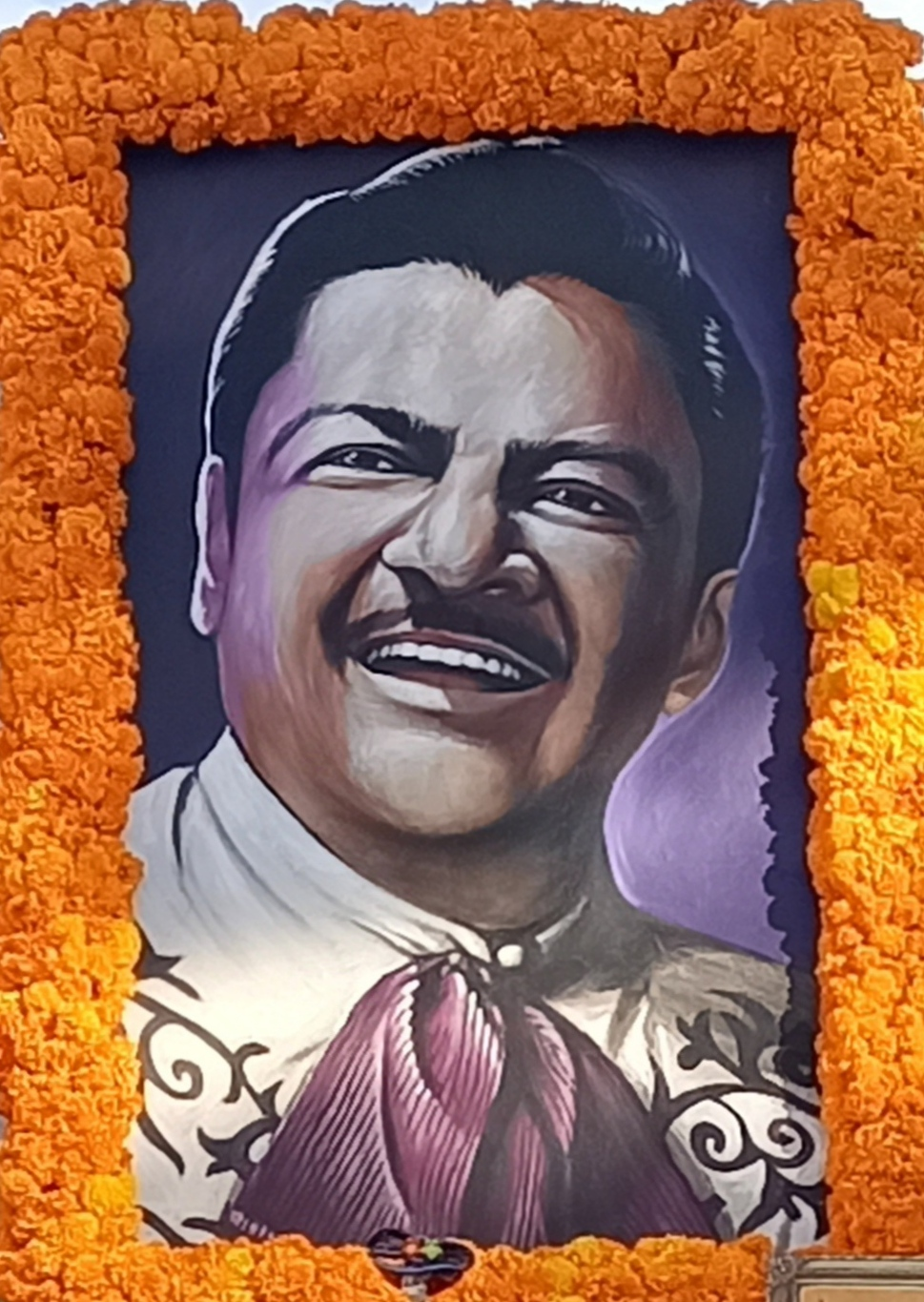
Ranchera songwriter José Alfredo Jiménez was the most successful composer of the 50s, as nine of his songs appear on the year-end charts throughout the decade.

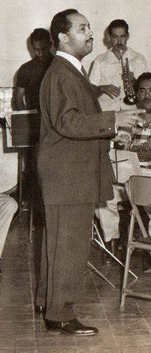
Cuban bandleader Dámaso Pérez Prado was the greatest exponent of the mambo craze that swept Mexico in the 50s.

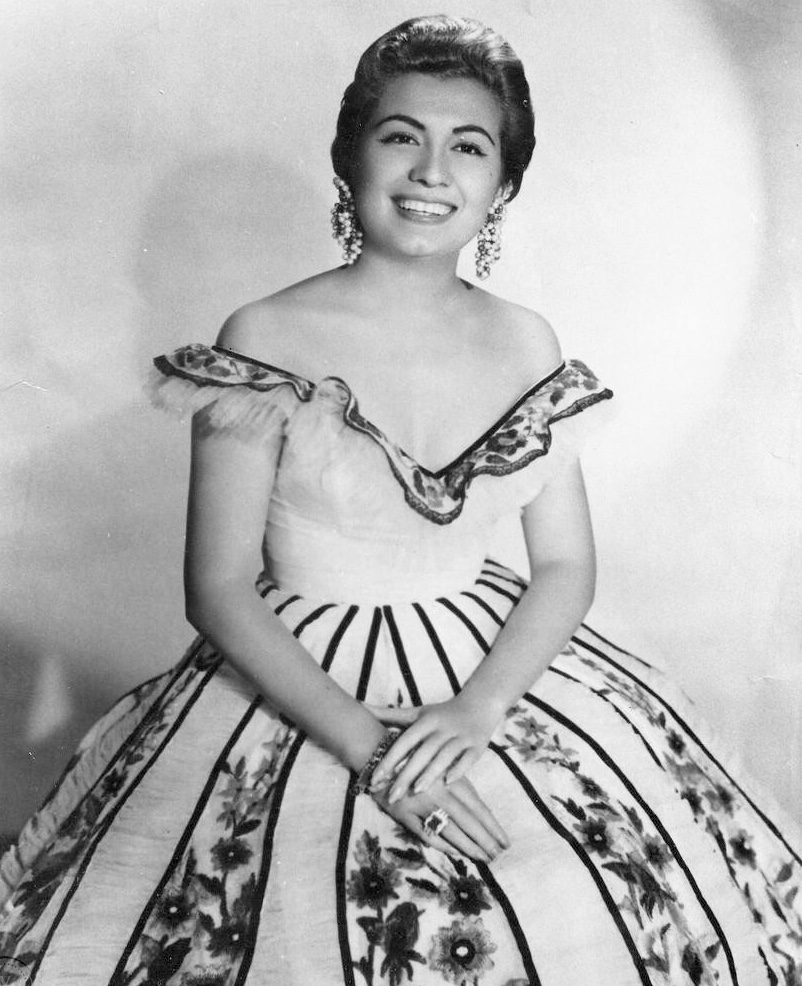
One of the most emblematic female ranchera singers of the 50s, Lola Beltrán recorded at least five of the songs that appear on the year-end charts throughout the decade.

In addition to the continued prominence of bolero music (typically performed by tríos) which had been popular since the previous decade, Mexican music in the 50s was dominated by domestic ranchera music and Cuban dance genres, such as mambo and danzón.

Ranchera music, generally associated with rural Mexico but popular in urban areas as well, got a considerable boost from the massive popularity of Pedro Infante (an actor and ranchera singer who was present on the Mexican music charts from the beginning of the decade until his death in 1957) and the emergence of songwriter José Alfredo Jiménez (who, after writing many hit songs for other ranchera singers, eventually began to record his own songs).

The successful 1950 recording "Qué rico mambo", by Dámaso Pérez Prado and his orchestra, is considered as having initiated the boom of mambo music in Mexico. This genre became so popular with Mexican audiences that many Cuban performers (such as the aforementioned Pérez Prado and Beny Moré) moved to Mexico and appeared in Mexican movies, and it also paved the way for other Cuban musicians (such as the Sonora Matancera) who played genres other than mambo to find success in Mexico. The mambo craze of the 50s in Mexico, specially in urban areas where it became linked to the pachuco subculture, has been compared to the rock and roll craze that would sweep the United States in the same decade.

The year 1960 marked the beginning of a new era, with the appearance of the first nationwide rock and roll hits: "La hiedra venenosa" (a cover of The Coasters' "Poison Ivy") by Los Rebeldes del Rock, and "La plaga" (a cover of Little Richard's "Good Golly, Miss Molly") by Los Teen Tops, paving the way for rock and roll music (usually through Spanish-language covers of American and British songs) to become the dominant genre in the Mexican charts of the 60s.

== Year-end charts ==
The following year-end charts were elaborated by Mejía Barquera, based on weekly charts that were published on the magazine Selecciones musicales as compiled on Roberto Ayala's 1962 book "Musicosas: manual del comentarista de radio y televisión"; those charts were, according to Ayala, based on record sales, jukebox plays, radio and television airplay, and sheet music sales (Note: (Translated from Spanish) "Record agencies all over the country, jukebox operators, music publishers, recording houses and correspondents for Selecciones Musicales send local reports every week. In the headquarters, each one of those reports is assessed and by means of a scoreboard each song is rated so as to determine the position that it is to occupy on the "Hit Parade".). Mejía Barquera then took one chart from the second week of every month of a calendar year, so as to have twelve charts per year, and assigned "points" to the songs on those charts based on their ranking (from 10 points for a first place to 1 point for a tenth place), adding up the points to make his year-end charts.

The charts published by Selecciones Musicales and compiled in the Musicosas book only include the song titles and the names of the composers; the performers credited in this article are included for reference and where many performers are listed for the same song, the performers appear in alphabetical order, which may not reflect whose version was the most popular (Note: While many times, like in other countries, a song would be popularized by one particular performer and it became identified with them, in the 1940s and 50s it was common practice in Mexico for a song to be recorded by various singers from different record labels around the same time; therefore, this article may not include all of the performers who recorded the songs around that period.).

=== 1950 ===
No.	Title	Songwriter(s)	Artist(s)
1	"Pobre corazón"	Chucho Monge	Pedro Infante
2	"Viajera"	Luis Arcaraz	Luis Arcaraz y su Orquesta
3	"Tú, solo tú"	Felipe Valdés Leal	Pedro Infante / Beny Moré / Trío Calaveras
4	"Quinto patio"	Luis Arcaraz	Luis Arcaraz y su Orquesta
5	"Qué rico mambo" (Note: Also titled "Qué rico el mambo" in some releases)	Dámaso Pérez Prado	Pérez Prado y su Orquesta
6	"Soy feliz"	Juan Bruno Tarraza	María Victoria con Orquesta de Luis Arcaraz
7	"La múcura"	Antonio Fuentes	Beny Moré con la Orquesta de Pérez Prado
8	"Yo"	José Alfredo Jiménez	Andrés Huesca y sus Costeños
9	"El gavilán pollero"	Ventura Romero	Pedro Infante
10	"Amorcito corazón"	Manuel Esperón & Pedro de Urdimalas	Pedro Infante / Trío Los Panchos

=== 1951 ===
No.	Title	Songwriter(s)	Artist(s)
1	"Usted"	Gabriel Ruiz & José Antonio Zorrilla	Los Tres Diamantes
2	"Llévame"	Gonzalo Curiel	Elvira Ríos / Emilio Tuero
3	"Pecado"	Enrique Mario Francini, Armando Pontier & Carlos Bahr	Orquesta Francini-Pontier / Trío Los Panchos
4	"Ella"	José Alfredo Jiménez	Miguel Aceves Mejía / Pedro Infante
5	"Condición"	Gabriel Ruiz	Los Tres Diamantes
6	"La que se fue"	José Alfredo Jiménez	Pedro Infante
7	"Tu castigo"	Ventura Romero	Lola Beltrán / Pedro Infante
8	"Bolero"	Paul Durand & Henri Contet	Paul Durand
9	"El fronterizo"	Miguel Ángel Castilla & José Ángel Castilla	Pedro Infante
10	"Carta a Eufemia"	Rubén Méndez & Rubén Fuentes	Pedro Infante

=== 1952 ===
No.	Title	Songwriter(s)	Artist(s)
1	"Pénjamo"	Rubén Méndez	Pedro Infante
2	"Nube gris"	Eduardo Márquez Talledo	Pedro Infante
3	"Amor, qué malo eres"	Luis Marquetti	Lucho Gatica / Los Tres Diamantes / Pedro Vargas
4	"Las coronelas"	Bonifacio Collazo	Various artists
5	"Peso sobre peso"	Chava Flores	Chava Flores / Pedro Infante
6	"El plebeyo"	Felipe Pinglo Alva	Pedro Infante / Fernando Fernández
7	"Carta a Eufemia"	Rubén Méndez & Rubén Fuentes	Pedro Infante
8	"Mi cafetal"	Crescencio Salcedo	Hermanas Lima
9	"La interesada"	Chava Flores	Various artists
10	"¿Dónde está mi saxofón?" (Note: Also titled "¿En dónde está mi saxofón?" in some releases)	Fernando Rosas	Various artists

=== 1953 ===
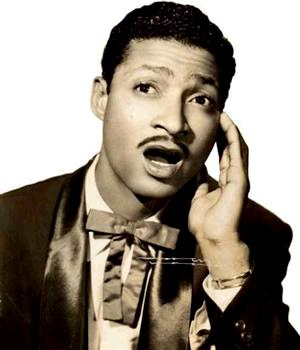
The lyrics of "Bonito y sabroso", performed by Cuban singer Beny Moré (pictured), talk about Mexicans' appreciation of mambo music at the time, and describes Mexico City and Havana as being "sister cities".

No.	Title	Songwriter(s)	Artist(s)
1	"Piel canela"	Bobby Capó	Bobby Capó con la Sonora Matancera / Lucho Gatica / Pedro Vargas
2	"Tu recuerdo y yo"	José Alfredo Jiménez	Miguel Aceves Mejía / Pedro Infante
3	"El jinete"	José Alfredo Jiménez	Jorge Negrete
4	"Ruega por nosotros"	Alberto Cervantes & Rubén Fuentes	Miguel Aceves Mejía / Lucho Gatica / Pedro Infante
5	"Candilejas"	Charles Chaplin	Los Tecolines
6	"Cerezo Rosa (Cherry Pink And Apple Blossom White)"	Louiguy & Antoine Leonardi	Los Tecolines / Pérez Prado y su orquesta / Trío los Panchos
7	"Tienes que pagar"	Alberto Cervantes & Rubén Fuentes	Pedro Infante
8	"Ni por favor"	Alberto Cervantes & Rubén Fuentes	Pedro Infante
9	"Bonito y sabroso"	Beny Moré	Beny Moré con Orquesta Rafael de Paz
10	"Vaya con Dios"	Larry Russell, Inez James & Buddy Pepper	Pedro Infante / Nat King Cole

=== 1954 ===
No.	Title	Songwriter(s)	Artist(s)
1	"Cien años"	Alberto Cervantes & Rubén Fuentes	Pedro Infante
2	"Contigo en la distancia"	César Portillo de la Luz	Lucho Gatica / Pedro Infante / Andy Russell
3	"Ruega por nosotros"	Alberto Cervantes & Rubén Fuentes	Miguel Aceves Mejía / Lucho Gatica / Pedro Infante
4	"Camino de Guanajuato"	José Alfredo Jiménez	Pedro Infante
5	"Espinita"	Nico Jiménez	Ana María González / Virginia López / Trío Los Panchos
6	"La engañadora"	Enrique Jorrín	Enrique Jorrín y orquesta
7	"¿Quién será?"	Pablo Beltrán Ruiz	Pedro Infante / Sonora Matancera con Nelson Pinedo
8	"Gorrioncillo pecho amarillo"	Tomás Méndez	Lola Beltrán / Pedro Infante
9	"Bailando el Charleston" (Note: The original title in German is "Ich hab' das Fräulein Helen baden seh'n" ("I Saw Miss Helen Bathing"))	Fred Raymond & Emilio Donato Uranga	Various artists
10	"Doce cascabeles"	Ricardo Freire	Los Churumbeles

=== 1955 ===
No.	Title	Songwriter(s)	Artist(s)
1	"Mi último fracaso"	Alfredo Gil	Trío Los Panchos
2	"Llegaste tarde"	Wello Rivas	Los Tres Ases [es]
3	"La del rebozo blanco"	Rafael Cárdenas & Rubén Fuentes	Various artists
4	"Mil besos"	Emma Elena Valdelamar	María Victoria
5	"Un mundo raro"	José Alfredo Jiménez	Pedro Infante / Trío Calaveras
6	"A los cuatro vientos"	Tomás Méndez	Miguel Aceves Mejía
7	"Dime de quién es tu corazón" (Note: Usually abbreviated to "De quién es tu corazón".)	José de Jesús Morales	Los Cuatro Soles / Marilú
8	"Rogaciano"	Valeriano Trejo	Miguel Aceves Mejía
9	"Grito prisionero"	Gabriel Ruiz & Gabriel Luna de la Fuente	Pedro Infante
10	"Segundas partes"	Vicente Garrido	Hermanos Martínez Gil [es]

=== 1956 ===
No.	Title	Songwriter(s)	Artist(s)
1	"No me platiques más" (Note: Also titled "No me platiques ya" or "No me platiques" in some releases)	Vicente Garrido	Lucho Gatica / Pedro Infante / Los Tres Ases (Note: According to the composer Vicente Garrido, Los Tres Ases were the first to make the song a success, leading Gatica and Infante to record their own versions shortly after.) [es]
2	"Que seas feliz"	Consuelo Velázquez	Lola Beltrán / Libertad Lamarque / Los Tres Ases
3	"Grítenme, piedras del campo"	Cuco Sánchez	Miguel Aceves Mejía / Amalia Mendoza / Rosita Quintana
4	"Historia de un amor"	Carlos Almarán	Libertad Lamarque / Los Tres Ases / Pérez Prado y su Orquesta / Sonora Matancera con Leo Marini
5	"Échenme la tierra encima"	Rodolfo de la Garza	Pedro Infante
6	"Alma de acero"	José Alfredo Jiménez	Lola Beltrán / Pedro Infante / Trío Calaveras
7	"Amor mío"	Álvaro Carrillo	Lucho Gatica / Los Tres Diamantes
8	"Angustia"	Orlando Brito	Sonora Matancera con Bienvenido Granda
9	"Vanidad"	Armando Gónzález Malibrán	Genaro Salinas / Los Tres Ases
10	"Estoy perdido"	Víctor Manuel Mato	Los Tres Ases

=== 1957 ===
No.	Title	Songwriter(s)	Artist(s)
1	"El reloj"	Roberto Cantoral	Los Tres Caballeros
2	"Ay, cosita linda"	Francisco Galán	Pacho Galán y su Orquesta / Sonora Matancera con Carlos Argentino
3	"Tú me acostumbraste"	Frank Domínguez	Olga Guillot
4	"Te me olvidas"	Vicente Garrido	Olga Guillot / Los Tres Caballeros / José Antonio Méndez
5	"En la orilla del mar"	José Berroa	Sonora Matancera con Bienvenido Granda
6	"Espérame en el cielo"	Paquito López	Lucho Gatica / Pedro Vargas / Trío Los Panchos
7	"La cama de piedra"	Cuco Sánchez	Cuco Sánchez
8	"La barca"	Roberto Cantoral	Los Tres Caballeros
9	"Marcelino, pan y vino" (Note: The original title in Italian is "Ricordate Marcellino". Versions with Spanish lyrics were recorded by many artists at the time.)	Virgilio Savona, Tata Giacobetti & Barzizza	Various artists
10	"La pastora"	Alfredo D'Angelis & José Rótulo	Tony Camargo

=== 1958 ===
No.	Title	Songwriter(s)	Artist(s)
1	"Sabrás que te quiero"	Teddy Fregoso	Los Tres Ases / Raúl Shaw Moreno / Javier Solís
2	"Regálame esta noche"	Roberto Cantoral	Los Tres Caballeros
3	"Rumbo perdido"	Mario Álvarez	Los Tres Ases [es] / Javier Solís
4	"Échame a mí la culpa"	José Ángel Espinoza	Amalia Mendoza / Javier Solís
5	"Fascinación"	Fermo Dante Marchetti	Tito Guízar / Trío Hermanos Michel / Sara Montiel / Los Cuatro Hermanos Silva
6	"Corazón de melón"	Carlos Rigual	Los Hermanos Rigual
7	"Todo y nada"	Vicente Garrido	Los Tres Ases / Lucho Gatica
8	"Cuando tú me quieras"	Mario Barrios & Raúl Shaw Moreno	Los Tres Ases / Raúl Shaw Moreno / Javier Solís
9	"Lágrimas de amor"	Raúl Shaw Moreno	Olimpo Cárdenas / Raúl Shaw Moreno
10	"Nel blu dipinto di blu"	Franco Migliacci & Domenico Modugno	Domenico Modugno

=== 1959 ===
No.	Title	Songwriter(s)	Artist(s)
1	"La margarita"	Mariano Mercerón	Mariano Mercerón y su Orquesta
2	"Bala perdida"	Tomás Méndez	Lola Beltrán
3	"Me extraña"	Luis Martínez Serrano	Los Tres Caballeros
4	"Nuestro juramento"	Benito de Jesús	Julio Jaramillo
5	"Jacaranda"	Enrique Fabregat & Mario Molina Montes	Los Tres Ases [es] / Trío Los Santos
6	"Lágrimas del alma"	Bonny Villaseñor	Miguel Aceves Mejía / Lucho Gatica / Flor Silvestre / Javier Solís
7	"Qué bonito amor"	José Alfredo Jiménez	Miguel Aceves Mejía / Elvira Ríos / Flor Silvestre / Javier Solís
8	"Decídete"	Ramón Inclán	Los Dandys
9	"Un telegrama"	Alfredo & Gregorio García Segura	Monna Bell
10	"Gema"	Güicho Cisneros	Los Dandys

=== 1960 ===
No.	Title	Songwriter(s)	Artist(s)
1	"Sabor a mí"	Álvaro Carrillo	Rolando Laserie / Los Tres Ases [es]
2	"Limosnero de amor"	Alberto Videz	Alberto Beltrán / Javier Solís
3	"Bésame y olvídame"	Beatriz Jiménez	Javier Solís
4	"La boa"	Félix Reina & Carlos Lico (Note: The song is based on a Cuban instrumental danzón titled "Angoa", composed by Félix Reina. The Mexican musician Carlos Lico later wrote lyrics to it and recorded it with his group, Los Pao, with the new title "La boa", which became a nationwide hit when Sonora Santanera covered it.)	Sonora Santanera
5	"Adiós"	Alfredo Carrasco	Los Tecolines
6	"No pidas más perdón"	Blas Hernández & Paul Márquez	Los Llopis / Sonora Matancera con Carlos Argentino
7	"Ayúdame, Dios mío"	Mario de Jesús	María Elena Sandoval
8	"Canción de Orfeo"	Luis Bonfá (Note: Spanish lyrics by Mario Molina Montes.)	Los Tres Diamantes
9	"La plaga"	John Marascalco & Robert Blackwell (Note: Spanish lyrics by Los Teen Tops.)	Los Teen Tops
10	"La hiedra venenosa"	Jerry Leiber and Mike Stoller (Note: Spanish lyrics by Francisco Domínguez.)	Los Rebeldes del Rock
11 (Note: Mejía Barquera includes eleven songs for his 1960 year-end chart, instead of the ten songs that had been listed for other years.)	"El aguijón"	Ignacio Jaime	Charro Avitia / Lola Casanova / Emilio Domínguez / Hermanas Huerta
