= Bing Sings the Hits =

Compilation album by Bing Crosby
- Released: 1954
- Recorded: 1953
- Genre: Popular
- Length: 23:27
- Label: Decca Records

Bing Crosby chronology
Some Fine Old Chestnuts (1954)	Bing Sings the Hits (1954)	Selections from Irving Berlin's White Christmas (1954)

Bing Sings the Hits is a Decca Records album by Bing Crosby of hit songs from the early 1950s. It was issued as a 10-inch LP with catalog number DL 5520.

== Background ==
Crosby’s record company had issued an almost constant stream of 10” LPs in previous years often using his back catalog extensively with a newer song or two added to enhance the commercial appeal. This album comprised contemporary songs newly recorded by Crosby. The first six tracks on the album were recorded with John Scott Trotter and His Orchestra for use on Crosby’s radio program and were mastered by Decca on December 31, 1953 for commercial release.

== Reception ==
Billboard commented: “Many of Bing’s fans will be interested in this collection of top hits of the day, sung by the “Groaner” with his usual light-hearted, but sincere air…Should be a brisk seller.” Retail rating 78 (out of 100).

== Track listing for 10" LP ==
Side one
No.	Title	Writer(s)	Performed with	Length
1.	"Vaya Con Dios" (December 31, 1953)	Larry Russell, Inez James, Buddy Pepper	John Scott Trotter and his Orchestra	4:05
2.	"My Love, My Love" (December 31, 1953)	Nick Acquaviva, Bob Haymes	John Scott Trotter and his Orchestra	2:39
3.	"Stranger in Paradise" (December 31, 1953)	Robert Wright, George Forrest	John Scott Trotter and his Orchestra	2:35
4.	"No Other Love" (December 31, 1953)	Richard Rodgers, Oscar Hammerstein II	John Scott Trotter and his Orchestra	3:45

Side two
No.	Title	Writer(s)	Performed with	Length
1.	"Secret Love" (December 31, 1953)	Sammy Fain, Paul Francis Webster	John Scott Trotter and his Orchestra	2:53
2.	"I Love Paris" (December 31, 1953)	Cole Porter	John Scott Trotter and his Orchestra	2:23
3.	"Changing Partners" (November 14, 1953)	Larry Coleman, Joe Darion	Perry Botkin and His Orchestra, and Marie Green and Jud Conlon’s Rhythmaires	2:44
4.	"Y’All Come" (November 14, 1953)	Arlie Duff	Perry Botkin and His Orchestra, and The Cass County Boys	2:23

== Personnel ==
John Scott Trotter and His Orchestra

Red Nichols (cornet); Bobby Guy, Ziggy Elman (trumpets); Ted Vesley, Joseph F. Howard, Wendell Mayhew (trombones); Matty Matlock, Phil Shuken, Warren Baker, David Harris, Larry Wright (reeds); Jacques Gasselin, Harry Bluestone, Murray Kellner, Mayer Oberman, Henry Hill, Mischa Russell (violins); David Sterkin (viola); Cy Bernard (cello); Buddy Cole (piano); Perry Botkin (guitar); Phil Stephens (string bass); Nick Fatool (drums)
