= Eduardo Márquez =

Eduardo Márquez may refer to:

- Eduardo Márquez Talledo (1902–1975), Peruvian composer
- Eduardo Márquez (footballer) (1944–2020), Peruvian football forward

== See also ==
- Eduardo Marques (born 1976), Brazilian football striker
