= My Love, My Love =

Popular song published in 1953

"My Love, My Love" is a popular song. It was composed by Nicholas Acquaviva with lyrics by Bob Haymes and published in 1953.

== Versions ==
The biggest hit version was done by Joni James and released in July, 1953 for MGM Records. It reached No. 8 in the Billboard charts. The song's composer, Nick Acquaviva, was the brother of conductor-composer Tony Acquaviva, who was married to James.

Bing Crosby recorded it for Decca Records on December 31, 1953 and it was also included on his LP Bing Sings the Hits. The song was also recorded in the United Kingdom by Alma Cogan the same year. Other recordings were by Connie Francis (recorded in 1960 and included on the album Songs to a Swinging Band (1961), and she also performed it on the Ed Sullivan Show. And included in the 1996 box set Kissin', Twistin', Goin' Where the Boys Are.) and by Julie London (released as a single in 1961). The American musical group of doo-wop style, The Duprees, issued a version as a single in 1968.

Alberto Semprini, on piano with rhythm accompaniment, recorded it in London on October 13, 1953 as the second melody of the medley "Dancing to the piano (No. 22) - Hit medley of waltzes" along with "Vaya con Dios" and "The Melba Waltz". The medley was released by EMI on the His Master's Voice label as catalog number B10592.
