= Vargas de Tecalitlán =

Mexican mariachi ensemble

Mariachi Vargas de Tecalitlán
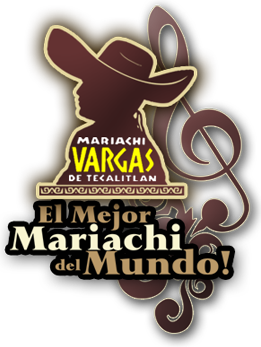

Background information
- Origin: Tecalitlán, Jalisco, Mexico
- Genres: Son jaliscience, canción ranchera, bolero ranchero, corrido, huapango de mariachi, polka, jarabe, son jarocho and vals mexicano.
- Years active: 1897–present
- Label: Nacional
- Members: Julio Martínez; Enrique De Santiago; Arturo Vargas; Gilberto Macias; Gustavo Alvarado; Alberto Alfaro; Andrés González; Daniel Martínez; Miguel Angel Barron; Jorge Aguayo; Carlos Martinez; Manuel Alcaraz
- Past members: Luís Fernando Martínez; Jose "Pepe" Martinez (Past Director); Steeven Sandoval (Violin); Fernando Velazquez (Trumpet); Federico Torres (Trumpet); José Martínez Jr. (Violin)
- Website: www.elmariachivargas.com

Mariachi Vargas de Tecalitlán is a Mexican folk ensemble of mariachi music founded in 1896 by Gaspar Vargas. Beginning in 1950 it was under the artistic guidance of the late Rubén Fuentes. The group's musical direction had been the responsibility of Don Jose "Pepe" Martínez from 1975 to around 2013–2014. Now the ensemble is under the direction of Carlos Martínez (ex-director of Mariachi Nuevo Tecalitlan).

== Members ==
A minimum mariachi group has 2 violins, 2 trumpets, 1 guitarrón, 1 guitar, and 1 vihuela. Complete mariachi groups have a minimum of 12 members with the standard 6 violins, 3 trumpets, 1 guitarrón, 1 guitar and 1 vihuela. A 13th member is often a harp, an extra violin, a guitarra de golpe, or an extra guitar. The Mariachi Vargas de Tecalitlán currently has fourteen members, distributed as follows.

- Violins: Carlos Martínez (2014), Daniel Martinez (1985), Andres Gonzalez (2007), Oscar Ortega (2017), Roberto Lopez (2018), Angel Lopez (2018).
- Trumpets: Gustavo Alvarado (1990), Luis Fernandez Velasquez (2008), Agustin Sandoval (2019), Alejandro Aguilar (2010)
- Guitarrón: Enrique de Santiago (1989)
- Guitar: Arturo Vargas (2002), Jonathan Palomar (2017)
- Vihuela: Gilberto Aguirre (2013)
- Harp: Victor Alvarez (2018)

== Former members ==
- Violins: Alberto Alfaro, Manuel Vargas, Jose Martinez, Jose Martinez Jr., Miguel Angel Barron, Osvaldo Mendoza, Ruben Fuentes, Steeven Sandoval, Mario de Santiago, Juan Manuel Viurquiz, Salvador Torres, Santiago Ramirez, Heriberto Molina, Juan Pinzon, Jesus Rodriguez de Huizar, Nicolas Torres
- Trumpets: Federico Torres, Rigoberto Mercado, Alejandro Aguilar
- Guitarrón: Naty de Santiago
- Guitar: Rafael Palomar, Manuel Godina
- Vihuela: Victor Cardenas
- Harp: Julio Martinez, Arturo Mendoza

== History ==
The history of Mariachi Vargas de Tecalitlán is divided into five phases (or generations); the first generation from 1896 to 1930, the second from 1931 to 1949, the third from 1950 to 1993, the fourth from 1994 to 2002 and the fifth since 2003 to date.

=== 1st generation (1897–1930) ===
The Mariachi Vargas de Tecalitlán was born in a small city called Tecalitlán, to the south of Jalisco. The group was not first referred to as a ‘mariachi’, but rather a fandago. Founded in 1896 by Don Gaspar Vargas the formation during those years was provided by the guitarra de golpe (or mariachera) played precisely by Don Gaspar, the wooden harp by Manuel Mendoza, and two violins played by Lino Quintero and Refugio Hernandez. The combination of these instruments established the "Sonido Tecalitlán" which distinguished from the "Sonido Cocula". (The Mariachi from Cocula utilized the guitarron and the vihuela in place of the harp and the guitarra de golpe aside from the two violins). In 1913, Don Gaspar introduced one trumpet to the group but it was not well accepted and, in later performances, its high-pitched sound was considered annoying. The cornet was replaced by another violin. The group consisted then of five elements. The son of Don Gaspar Vargas, Silvestre Vargas, joined as a violinist in 1921. From 1926 the group consisted of Gaspar Vargas - Guitarra de golpe, Manuel Mendoza - Harp, Silvestre Vargas, Trinidad Olivera and Nicolas Torres - Violins.

=== 2nd generation (1931–1949) ===
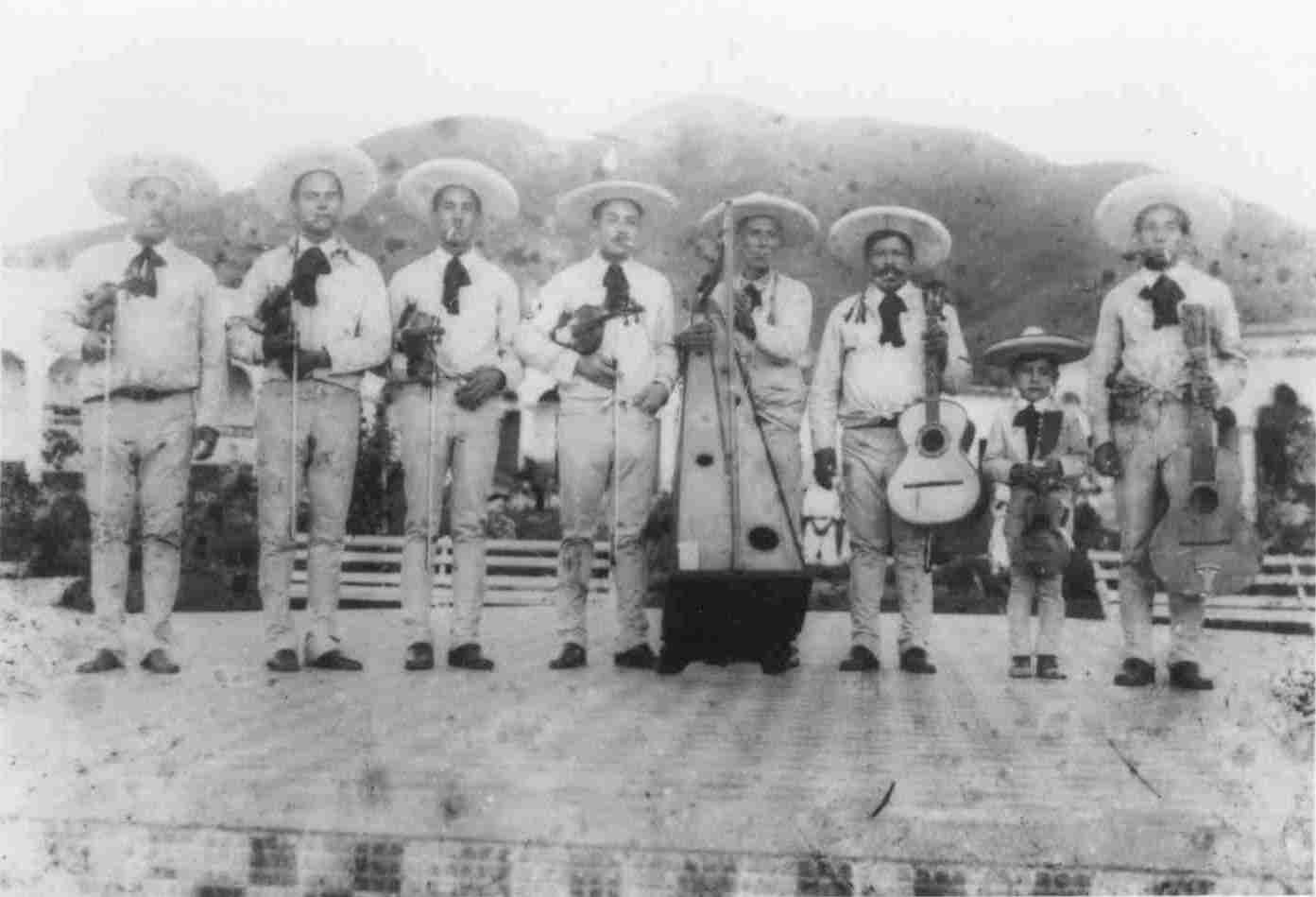
Mariachi Vargas in 1932

In 1931 Gaspar Vargas turned the leadership of Mariachi Vargas de Tecalitlán over to his son, Silvestre. As the first step in his reorganization Silvestre decided to enlarge the group to eight musicians. He invited his compatriots, the Quintero brothers, Rafael and Jeronimo to join. One played a violin and the other a guitar. Later he would add another violin played by Santiago Torres. He moved Trinidad Olivera from the violin to the guitarron, although still preserving the wooden harp. It was Silvestre who possessed a dream that his group would one day be the greatest mariachi in all Mexico and he was relentless in his pursuit of fulfilling that dream. The Mariachi Vargas was something of an oddity in the early 1930s; the members were all dressed in charro suits, they showed up on time for performances, and they were sober.

==== Mexico City ====
In 1933 they won first place in a Mariachi contest celebrated in Guadalajara. Then again, in Mexico City, in 1934, they were awarded another first place prize. President Lázaro Cárdenas, who enjoyed the music of "Vargas", subsequently had the group hired as the official mariachi of the Mexico City Police Department and the group moved to Mexico City where they remained for 20 years. They provided music and entertainment for the capital city at its parks and gardens. Beginning in 1937, the Mariachi Vargas appeared in "Asi es mi Tierra", the first of its more than 200 motion pictures. They played in many of Pedro Infante's movies as well. In that same year they recorded their first record and signed an exclusive contract with RCA.

==== Addition of the trumpet and violin ====
In 1941, the group definitively integrated the trumpet into their musical interpretations. Miguel Martínez Domínguez was the first trumpet player for Mariachi Vargas de Tecalitlán; he is considered the creator of the mariachi-style trumpet as well as its best performer, teacher, and exemplar. In 1944, Rubén Fuentes, a classical violinist with no background in mariachi music, was asked by Silvestre to join the group. Fuentes joined as a violinist and took over as music arranger. Silvestre Vargas and Ruben Fuentes reorganized Mariachi Vargas de Tecalitlán and changed the group's sound. To overcome the unsavory connotations that the term "mariachis" had for the public in those days, the two leaders also updated the group's image by demanding professional presentation.

=== 3rd generation (1950–1993) ===
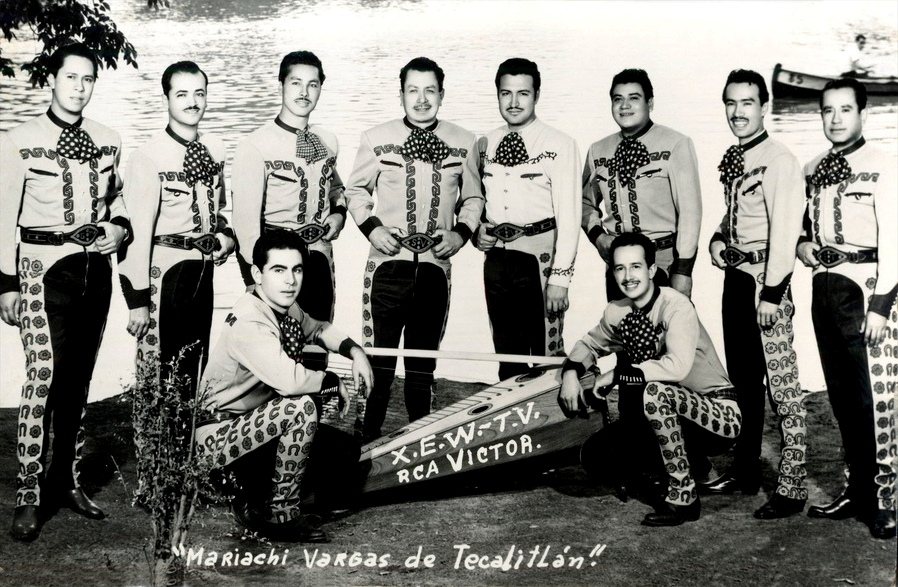
Mariachi Vargas in 1950

==== Unifying the sound ====
Fuentes took complete responsibility for the group's musical direction, and enriched the evolution that for many years had conserved the primitive and unstudied qualities of mariachi. The changing sound of the Mariachi Vargas de Tecalitlán was redirected without the abandonment of its roots or traditions. The Huapangos and Sones (which were two very distinctive styles of the mariachi music) were being interpreted in many diverse and different ways. The Mariachi Vargas recorded the Sones with arrangements and adaptations as patterns for other groups. This stratagem promoted the concept that all mariachi groups could be unified to those versions by taking them as examples. The traditional songs and the original sound of the mariachi began to mature in the 1950s. It was during the recordings of the "Golden Age of the Huapangos" that the compositions, arrangements and musical direction of Rubén Fuentes, and the unequaled voice of Miguel Aceves Mejía, initiated a musical shift that would change the sound and instrumentation of the mariachi. Due to the fact they change mariachi from the start they choose to keep it in away that it would still be traditional.

==== Revolutionary new harmony ====
In 1955 Rubén Fuentes stopped performing with the group. However, He maintained his position as producer, musical arranger and musical director up until his death, assisted initially by Jesús Rodríguez de Hijar and, under both, the administrative and directoral oversight of Silvestre Vargas. In 1966 Rubén Fuentes wrote "La Bikina", a song that was recognized as the epitome of this Revolutionary New Harmony and sound of the mariachi. Fuentes wrote and produced music for Mariachi Vargas that noted for its emotional qualities. As much in Mexico as in foreign countries, the Sones and Huapangos acquire new directions.

==== Mariachi conferences ====
In the 1970s interest in mariachi music was waning. But all that changed when San Antonio, Texas held its first international mariachi conference in September 1979. In 1975, Jose "Pepe" Martinez, Sr. became the musical director of Mariachi Vargas. He wrote many arrangements including "Violin Huapango" which individually showcase the different instruments and members in the group. In 1983, the Mariachi Vargas appeared for the first time at the Tucson International Mariachi Conference. A new movement began to grow and many other conferences began to develop. The Mariachi Vargas was often chosen as the headline performer.

==== Linda Ronstadt ====
In 1986, Linda Ronstadt appeared with the Mariachi Vargas at the Tucson International Mariachi Conference where she sang publicly in Spanish for the first time. In 1987 she released her "Canciones de mi Padre" album featuring Mariachi Vargas which won her a Grammy award for the album. She also went on a national tour with the group, giving greater international exposure to mariachi music than ever before and creating a new audience for mariachi music among non-Hispanics.

==== Classical mariachi ====
In 1989, the Mariachi Vargas released their "En Concierto" CD featuring some of the greatest renderings of classical music ever played by a mariachi group. They also accompanied Lucero in the 1990s as she rose in the ranks of contemporary musical stardom. The Mariachi Vargas de Tecalitlán initiated a series of solo recordings: Sones, Valses, Pasos Dobles, Bailes Regionales, Polkas, Clasico e International, etc. They have added more than 50 recordings of mariachi music interpreted by what has become "The Best Mariachi in the World."

=== 4th generation (1994–2002) ===
In their album "La fiesta del Mariachi", Mariachi Vargas de Tecalitlán, fourth generation, the group integrates to make a tribute to Jose "Pepe" Martínez, who besides his magnificent musical arrangements and direction of the group, inspired many as a composer. Their recordings on Polygram with this generation include are, "El Mariachi Vargas", "En Concierto", "Los sones Reyes", "La fiesta del Mariachi" and "50 anniversary of Rubén Fuentes". Rubén Fuentes's arrangements and music with the Mariachi Vargas de Tecalitlán are the first five recordings for the one-hundredth anniversary of the foundation of "Vargas" in 1997.

=== 5th generation (2003–present) ===
In 2003 Mariachi Vargas de Tecalitlán began its fifth generation. Their latest recordings are, "5ta Generacion", "Sinfonico I", "Sinfonico II", and "Penas, Desengaños... Y Amores". Today the group is composed of one harp, one vihuela, one guitar, one guitarron, three trumpets and six violins. With the added instruments, a new sound has emerged that crosses all international borders. The music they play now ranges from the traditional sones to classical works as well as popurris that continue to delight audiences everywhere. In the 100 years since its foundation, the group has gone through some major changes. While there has been some departure from the tradition during that time, the group has maintained its roots through the playing of traditional Mexican sones. In 1997, "Mariachi Vargas de Tecalitlán" celebrated its first One Hundred years of foundation. One of the most popular writers was Mario Vargas.

== Discography ==
From 1937 until now (2009), the Mariachi Vargas has produced over 50 recordings, whose contents are Huastecos sones, waltzes, popurris, polkas, huapango, cumbias, among others.

- Danzones (1964 RCA)
- Mariachi Vargas (RCA Victor, 1953).
- Colección Original (BMG Latin, 1999) –This is a recording recompilation made while 1958–1968 -.
- Lo Mejor de lo Mejor (BMG Latin, 2000) –This is a recording recompilation made while 1958–1967 -.
- Tradicionales de México Lindo Y Querido (LIDERES, 2001).
- Sinfónico With Orquesta Filarmónica del Estado de Querétaro (2001) –Directed by Maestro José Guadalupe Flores-.
- 5ta. Generación (2002).
- Sinfónico II With Orquesta Filarmónica del Estado de Querétaro (2002) Directed by Maestro José Guadalupe Flores-.
- Penas, Desengaños Y Amores (2004).
- Y aquí estamos (2008).
