= Miguel Martínez Domínguez =

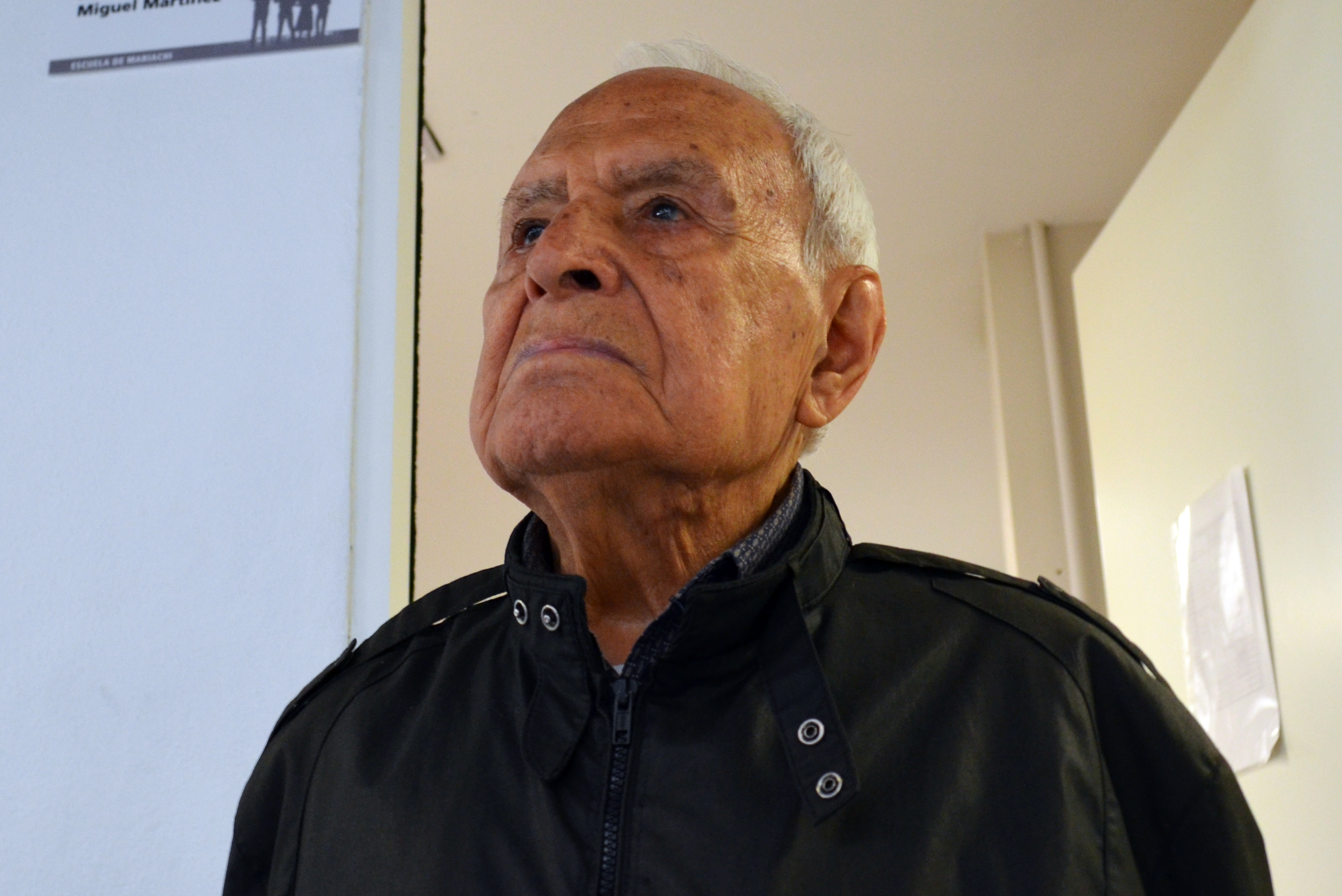

Background information
- Birth name: Miguel Martínez Domínguez
- Also known as: Miguel Martínez, el Trompetas, el Cuerno, el padre de la trompeta mariachera
- Born: September 29, 1921; Celaya, Guanajuato, Mexico
- Died: December 5, 2014 (aged 93); Mexico City, Mexico
- Genres: Mariachi
- Instrument(s): Trumpet, violin
- Years active: 1930–2014
- Formerly of: Mariachi de Concho Andrade, Mariachi Vargas de Tecalitlán, Mariachi México de Pepe Villa

Miguel Martínez Domínguez (September 29, 1921 in Celaya, Guanajuato – December 5, 2014 in Mexico City) was a Mexican musician, composer and arranger of mariachi, pioneer in the use of trumpet in this genre.

== Biography ==
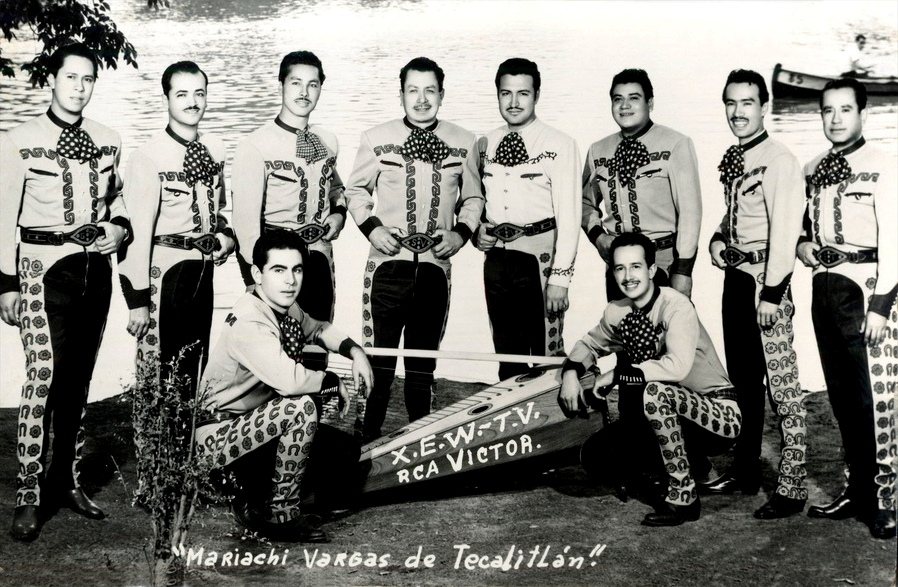
Martínez (fifth from left to right in the upper row) with Mariachi Vargas de Tecalitlán, circa 1950.

From the middle of the 1930s until 1940s, worked in the Plaza Garibaldi like musician in poor conditions, doing occasional substitutions with the mariachi of Concho Andrade that interpreted his pieces in the legendary bar Tenampa. Martínez worked in the Mariachi Vargas of Tecalitlán from 1942 until roughly 1965, with some absences. In this group Martínez defined the function of the trumpet in the mariachi, instrument that was not usual in this genre until him. During practically all his participation in the Mariachi Vargas worked like only as trumpeter. His form to interpret created a unique and pioneer style that is the most imitated model until the actuality. In the Mariachi México de Pepe Villa, Martinez invented the dueto de trompetas (duet of trumpets), used in the majority of mariachi groups. Martinez reduced his professional activity from the 1970s after a dental problem derived from the trumpet use. From the 1990s decade Martinez increased his participations and talks in the United States where he attended several Mariachi festivals and congresses giving talks and workshops.

== Work ==
=== Books ===
- Mi vida, mis viajes, mis vivencias: siete décadas en la música del mariachi (2012, Conaculta) ISBN 978-607-455-959-0

== See also ==
- Mariachi Vargas of Tecalitlán
