= Silvestre Vargas =

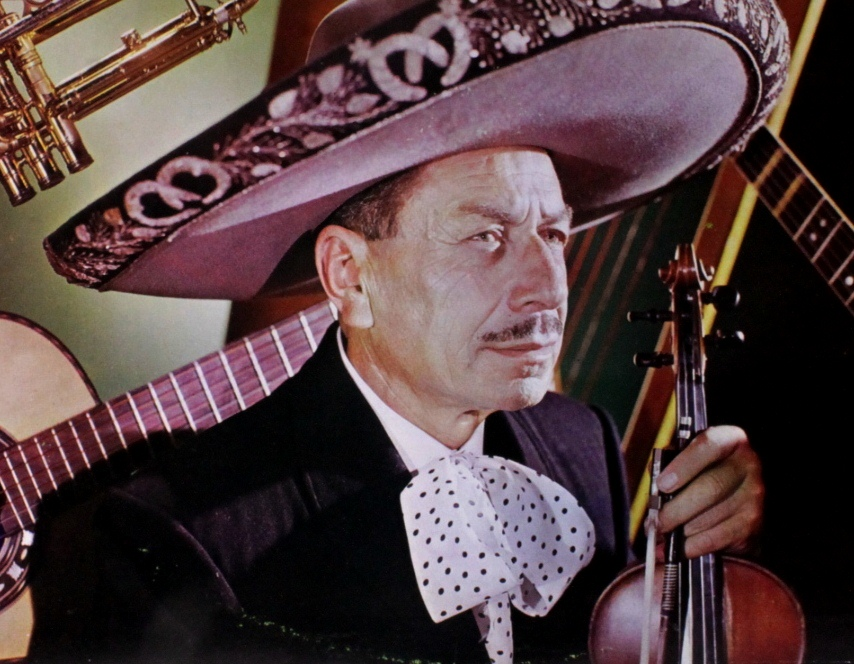
Silvestre Vargas (1901-1985), violins and musician of the Mariachi Vargas from 1921 to 1975, director from 1931 to 1955.

Silvestre Vargas (31 December, 1901 – October 7, 1985, Guadalajara) was a Mexican mariachi musician. In 1928, he became the leader of Mariachi Vargas de Tecalitlán, an ensemble from Jalisco begun by his father in 1898. In the 1930s the group moved to Mexico City, and Vargas, along with Rubén Fuentes, became pivotal composers in the evolution of the genre. Silvestre and the Mariachi Vargas made dozens of recordings and starred in many films through the 1960s. He died in 1985, and his gravesite became a popular site for pilgrimages on the date of his death. In 1997, a museum dedicated to Silvestre was established in Jalisco.
