= Golden Hoofs =

1941 film

- Theatrical release poster
- Directed by: Lynn Shores
- Screenplay by: Ben Grauman Kohn
- Story by: Roy Chanslor; Thomas Langan
- Produced by: Ralph Dietrich; Walter Morosco
- Starring: Jane Withers; Charles "Buddy" Rogers; Kay Aldridge; George Irving; Buddy Pepper
- Cinematography: Lucien N. Andriot
- Edited by: James B. Clark
- Music by: Cyril J. Mockridge
- Production company: 20th Century Fox
- Distributed by: 20th Century Fox
- Release date: February 14, 1941
- Running time: 68 minutes
- Country: United States
- Language: English

Golden Hoofs is a 1941 American comedy film directed by Lynn Shores and written by Ben Grauman Kohn. The film stars Jane Withers, Charles "Buddy" Rogers, Kay Aldridge, George Irving, Buddy Pepper and Cliff Clark. The film was released on February 14, 1941, by 20th Century Fox.

== Plot ==
Having loved and trained horses since she was a little girl, Jane Drake is devastated when her dad Dr. Tim Drake's farm is sold to Dean MacArdle, who also intends to abandon the longtime tradition of harness racing to bring in "bangtails" to race.

Dean is kind enough to sell Jane her favorite trotter, Yankee Doodle, for just $5. While she and her dad Doc Drake nurse that horse back to health, she persuades Dean to enter Doodle's old stablemate, Yankee Clipper, in the upcoming "Hiatoga Stakes," hoping to change his mind about harness racing.

Jane is disappointed when Dean's snobby sweetheart Cornelia Hunt shows up. She decides to enter Yankee Doodle in the same race out of spite, but after Yankee Clipper wins instead, Dean demonstrates to Jane once more that his heart's in the right place.

== Cast ==
- Jane Withers as Jane Drake
- Charles "Buddy" Rogers as Dean MacArdle
- Kay Aldridge as Cornelia Hunt
- George Irving as Dr. Timothy Drake
- Buddy Pepper as Morthy Witherspoon
- Cliff Clark as Booth
- Philip Hurlic as Mose
- Sheila Ryan as Gwen
- Howard Hickman as Calvin Harmon
- Mary Field as Nellie

== See also ==
- List of films about horse racing
