= Nick Acquaviva =

American composer

Nick Acquaviva (né Nicholas Paul Acquaviva; 27 May 1927 – 2 November 2003), (Note: There is a lot of confusion about Nick Acquaviva's dates, which are often given as April 11, 1926 – October 14, 1998. However, this birthdate seems unlikely as it would make him a month older than his elder brother Tony Acquaviva. Both the TimeLine of Composers and Arrangers who created works of Light Music, Easy Listening Music, Network Jingles, Old-Time Radio Themes & Classic Television Themes (retrieved 2016-02-24) and the National Library of Australia (retrieved 2016-02-24) state it as May 27, 1927 and his place of birth Beacon, New York. Based on this, and the information that his father's name was Michael, it can be concluded that he died on November 2, 2003. (Ancestry.com, retrieved 2016-02-24)) was an American composer, pianist and band leader.

== Career ==
Acquaviva was born in Beacon, New York, where his father Mike Acquaviva ran a barber shop on Main Street for many years. Like his elder brother Tony Acquaviva, he attended Juilliard and became a professional musician.

During World War II Nick Acquaviva served as Seaman first class in the US Navy. He is buried at Riverside National Cemetery.

The two brothers are often confused, sometimes even conflating them. Adding to the confusion, is the fact that Tony was married to singer Joni James, for whom Nick wrote several songs, including the hit "My Love, My Love".

== Selected works ==
Among the songs he wrote are:

- "That's What Christmas Means to Me" (1950). Lyrics by Ted Varnick; performed by Eddie Fisher.
- "I Will Love You Forever, My Love" (1952). Lyrics by Ted Varnick; performed by Guy Mitchell.
- "My Love, My Love" (1953). Lyrics by Bob Haymes; performed by Joni James.
- "Why Can't I" (1953). Lyrics by Ted Varnick; performed by Joni James.
- "Unless You're Really Mine" (1953) Ted Varnick (w&m), Nick Acquaviva (w&m)
- "Am I In Love?" (1954). Lyrics by Ted Varnick; performed by Joni James.
- "Is This The End Of The Line?" (1954). Lyrics by Bobby Worth; performed by Joni James.
- "When We Come Of Age" (1954). Lyrics by Norman Gimbel; performed by Joni James.
- "Prayer For Peace" (1955). Lyrics by Norman Gimbel; performed by Jony James and Perry Como.
- "Ghost Town" (1956). Lyrics by Ted Varnick; performed by Don Cherry.
- "Help Me" (1956). Lyrics by Don George; performed by Vic Damone.
- "Somewhere Someone Is Lonely" (1956). Lyrics by Don George; performed by Joni James
- "In The Middle Of An Island" (1957). Lyrics by Ted Varnick; performed by Tony Bennett.
- "Hangin' Around" (1958). Lyrics by Ted Varnick; performed by Guy Mitchell and Richard Hayes.
- "We Know" (1960). Lyrics by Peter Udell; performed by Joni James.
- "Is It Asking Too Much" (1965). Music with Ted Varnick; lyrics by Carl Sigman; performed by Jerry Vale.

== Selected discography ==
- The Exciting Sound of Acquaviva and His Orchestra

Decca DL 74465; DL 4465
OCLC 36030523, 775846765
(the Worldcat entry 36030523 incorrectly attributes the album to Tony Acquaviva)

1. "Intermission"
2. "Green Valley"
3. "Open your eyes"
4. "Hills of Rome"
5. "Dancing notes"
6. "Autumn again"
7. "Yesterday's love"
8. "A new shade of blue"
9. "One look at you"
10. "I found a rainbow"
11. "A fool was I"
12. "C'est la vie"
13. "After a dream"
