= Millican & Nesbitt =

British vocal duo

Millican & Nesbitt are a British vocal duo, comprising Alan Millican and Tom Nesbitt. They were former miners from Northumberland, England, who won the UK television talent contest, Opportunity Knocks, in 1973. They went on to release two charting singles and three albums. Millican & Nesbitt appeared on the final version of Opportunity Knocks hosted by Hughie Green in 1978.

They reached the Top 20 of the UK Singles Chart for one week, with their cover of "Vaya Con Dios (May God Be With You)", in the first week of 1974. Les Paul and Mary Ford had taken their version to No. 7 in the same chart in 1953.

== Discography ==
=== Albums ===
- Millican and Nesbitt (1974) (Pye) - UK No. 3
- Everybody Knows Millican and Nesbitt (1975) (Pye) - UK No. 23

=== Singles ===
- "Vaya Con Dios (May God Be With You)" (1973) (Pye) - UK No. 20
- "For Old Time's Sake" (1974) (Pye) - UK No. 38

== Other sources ==
- Heatley, Michael. Liner notes for The Millican & Nesbitt Collection CD (PDSCD 568/1)
