= In the Middle of an Island =

"In the Middle of an Island" is a popular song written by Nick Acquaviva and Ted Varnick and published in 1957.

== Tony Bennett version ==
The recording by Tony Bennett, with orchestral accompaniment by Ray Ellis, was released by Columbia Records as catalog number 40965. It first reached the Billboard magazine charts on August 12, 1957, and lasted 14 weeks on the chart. On the Disk Jockey chart, it peaked at number 13; on the Best Seller chart, at number 9; on the Top 100, which was an early version of the Hot 100, it reached number 9, becoming the last Top 10 hit of Bennett's long-lasting career. With this song, Bennett had his all-time worst disagreement with Mitch Miller, Columbia's pop music executive at the time, who absolutely wanted Bennett to record a version of the song; similarly, Bennett "[absolutely wanted] not to go anywhere" near it. Bennett had no response to Miller's question, "Am I going to have you put out a bad record?" Having not entirely gotten over his fear of losing his contract with Columbia, Bennett subsequently sang a half-hearted version of the song (which was never recorded). After the performance, Miller got disgusted and told Bennett to "just give [him] one take all the way through and we can all go home."

Bennett thought "To hell with it", so he took off his jacket and tied it around his waist like a hula skirt, started to do a hula dance, and managed to survive the take.

That's all I would do. To my great annoyance, it actually got into the Top Ten. But I've never received one request for that song in all the years I've been performing since. That was the last time I sang something I really couldn't stand.

- Tony Bennett to YouTuber Michael McKenna.

== Other recordings ==
- The recording by "Tennessee" Ernie Ford was released by Capitol Records as catalog number 3762. It reached the Billboard charts on September 23, 1957, its only week on the chart. On the Disk Jockey chart, it charted at number 23; on the composite chart of the top 100 songs, it reached number 56.
- King Brothers' version peaked at number 19 on the UK Single Charts in 1957.
