= Sabor a Mí =

1959 song by Álvaro Carrillo

Song by Álvaro Carrillo
- Language: Spanish
- English title: "Taste of me"
- Released: 1959
- Genre: Bolero

"Sabor a Mí" ("Taste of Me") is a 1959 bolero by Mexican musician and composer Álvaro Carrillo. Upon its release, it was recorded by many acts such as Los Tres Ases and Rolando Laserie, becoming the most successful song of 1960 in Mexico. It was further popularized by Los Panchos, who collaborated on their rendition with Eydie Gormé in 1964. Among the over 300 songs that he wrote, the song was considered Carrillo's most successful and popular both in Mexico and worldwide. Since its creation, the song has been covered by various artists, including Luis Miguel and José José, Bebo Valdes, EXO, José Feliciano, Monsieur Periné and Los Lobos.

Lyrically, the song is a sentimental ballad in which a romantic partner declares their desire to have their lover experience the "taste of" them for centuries upon centuries, promising a deep commitment. It is reminiscent of the Latin ballad of later decades, which intermixed Spanish language traditions with international pop music.

The autobiographical movie of Álvaro Carrillo, starring José José, uses this song name as its title.

== Covers ==
=== Luis Miguel version ===
"Sabor a Mí"

Song by Luis Miguel

from the album Romances
- Released: 1998
- Recorded: 1997
- Genre: Latin pop, bolero
- Length: 3:06
- Label: WEA Latina
- Songwriter: Álvaro Carrillo
- Producer: Luis Miguel

In 1997, Mexican singer Luis Miguel covered "Sabor a Mí" on his album Romances. It peaked at number six on the Billboard Hot Latin Songs. Miguel's cover was recognized as one of the best-performing songs of the year at the 1999 BMI Latin Awards.

Miguel's rendition received unfavorable reviews from music critics. Mario Tarradell of The Dallas Morning News noted that Miguel's cover of Sabor a Mí "retains some of its exotic, flamenco guitar-fueled flavor". Fernando Gonzalez of the Orange County Register was not impressed with Miguel's take as he felt that Miguel "sounds simply loud, rather than romantic". Los Angeles Times editor Ernesto Lechnero also criticized Luis Miguel's version of "Sabor a Mí" and stated that is "spun out of control with the addition of drums, reducing the lilting melody to something reminiscent of a TV commercial jingle".

=== Other covers ===
Mexican singer Javier Solís covered "Sabor a Mí" in 1960. His rendition was inducted into the Latin Grammy Hall of Fame in 2001.

José José covered the song when he played Álvaro Carrillo in the 1988 biopic.

As part of the Music Bank World Tour, the South Korean band EXO-K sang Sabor a Mí in Spanish at the "Music Bank in Mexico" show in Mexico City in 2014. The recording of the performance garnered millions of views online.

In 2016, Kali Uchis covered El Chicano's version of Sabor a Mí after she asked her fans online to vote for the song they wanted her to sing.

Other artists who have covered this song or made their own rendition include the following: Armando Manzanero, Bebo Valdés, Pérez Prado, Isabel Pantoja, Leonardo Paniagua, Javier Solís, Charles Manson, Rolando Laserie, Los Lobos, Los Sabandeños, Lucho Gatica, Manoella Torres, Mari Trini, Mina, Peppino di Capri, Orietta Berti, Lila Downs, José Feliciano, Carlos Cuevas, El Pescaílla, Los Ángeles Negros, David Cavazos, Rey Gordinflón, Tinku, Freddy Castillo, Monsieur Periné, El Chicano, The Mavericks, Cyrille Aimée, Jonathan Richman and Tony Glausi, among others.

In 2011, Filipino traditional music duo HARANA PINOY made a cover of the song in the Filipino Harana (serenade) style a form of serenading from the Philippines.

In 2021, a version of the song was featured in "Cry Macho".

Eliane Elias included the song in her 2021 album Mirror Mirror.

The Mavericks included the song on their 2020 album, en Español.

== See also ==
- Latin ballad
