= Vaya con Dios (song) =

Single by Les Paul and Mary Ford
- B-side: "Johnny (Is the Boy for Me)"
- Released: June 1953
- Genre: Pop
- Length: 2:50
- Label: Capitol
- Songwriters: Larry Russell, Inez James, and Buddy Pepper

Les Paul and Mary Ford singles chronology
"Sleep" (1953)	"Vaya con Dios" (1953)	"Johnny" (1953)

"Vaya con Dios (May God Be with You)" ([ˈba.ʝa kon djos], literally "Go with God") is a popular song written by Larry Russell, Inez James, and Buddy Pepper, and first recorded by Anita O'Day in December 1952. Les Paul and Mary Ford had a No.1 recording of the song in 1953. Members of the Western Writers of America chose it as one of the Top 100 Western songs of all time.

== Background ==
The most-popular version of the song was recorded by Les Paul and Mary Ford. This recording was released by Capitol Records as catalog number 2486 with "Johnny (Is the Boy for Me)" as the flip side in May 1953. It first reached the Billboard Best Seller chart on June 13, 1953 and lasted 31 weeks on the chart, reaching No.1 on August 8 and remaining at No.1 for a total of 11 non-consecutive weeks. The song also reached No.1 on the Cash Box chart where it remained at that top spot for five weeks. It was ranked the No.1 top tune of 1953, and the second best selling song of the year.

The Les Paul and Mary Ford single reached No. 7 in the UK backed with the Les Paul instrumental composition "Deep in the Blues" as the flip side.

In 2005, the 1953 Les Paul and Mary Ford recording was inducted in the Grammy Hall of Fame.

== Other notable recordings ==
1953 sheet music cover for the Les Paul and Mary Ford recording, Ardmore Music. New York.

The song has been recorded by:

- Roberto Alagna (2005)
- Peter Alexander (in German)
- Desi Arnaz, who sang it in two season 3 episodes of I Love Lucy; "Lucy and Ethel Buy the Same Dress" (1953) and "Home Movies" (1954)
- Chet Atkins
- Gene Autry
- Jeff Beck with Imelda May (2011)
- Rob & Gilly Bennett (1993)
- Lily Berglund (in Swedish)
- The Beverley Sisters (1953)
- Chuck Berry (1965) On album Fresh Berry's
- Roy Black (in German)
- Pat Boone (1959) On duet album Pat & Shirley Boone Side By Side
- Rocky Burnette
- Carole Carr with orchestra cond. by Hill Bowen. Recorded in London on September 13, 1953. It was released by EMI on the His Master's Voice label as catalog number B 10570.
- The Cats (1968 on album The Cats and in 1972 on single)
- Richard Clayderman
- Larry Clinton (1953)
- Nat King Cole (in Spanish)
- Giorgio Consolini in Italian
- Bing Crosby - recorded December 31, 1953 and included on his album Bing Sings the Hits (1954)
- Julie Daraîche (in French)
- Manu Dibango
- The Drifters (1964)
- Dyango in his 1977 album Contigo en la Distancia
- Tommy Edwards (1961)
- Chiemi Eri (in Japanese)
- Emile Ford and his band The Checkmates on his 1961 album "Emile".
- Freddy Fender (1976)
- The Fontane Sisters on their 1957 album "A Visit With The Fontane Sisters".
- Inez & Charlie Fox
- Connie Francis (Spanish: 1960, German: 1966)
- Don Gibson
- Jairo (1982)
- Harry James – Harry James & His Western Friends (Dot DLP 3735 and DLP 25735)
- Julio Iglesias – in 1976 Spanish version, in 2005 French version "C'est Votre Histoire Et La Mienne"
- Pedro Infante (1953 in Spanish)
- Joni James
- Gloria Jones
- Andrea Jürgens (1990)
- Kitty Kallen
- Ginette & Raymond Lavoie in French
- Byron Lee
- The Lennon Sisters
- Bob London (1953)
- Julie London - Latin in a Satin Mood
- The McGuire Sisters (1966)
- Wingy Manone (1953)
- Luis Mariano (1954)
- Al Martino (1978)
- Miguel Aceves Mejía
- Millican & Nesbitt (1973)
- Bob Moore (1967)
- Nana Mouskouri
- Anne Murray (2002)
- Chico O'Farrill
- Tony Orlando & Dawn (1972)
- Los Panchos
- Patrice et Mario (1955)
- Les Paul & Mary Ford (1953)
- The Popes
- Cliff Richard
- Semprini with Rhythm Accompaniment. Recorded in London on October 13, 1953 as the first melody of the medley "Dancing to the piano (No. 22) – Hit medley of waltzes" along with "My Love, My Love" and "The Melba Waltz". The medley was released by EMI on the His Master's Voice label as catalog number B 10592.
- Hank Snow
- Sunshine Quartett
- Sylvia Syms (1968)
- Mel Tormé - ¡Olé Tormé!
- Doris Troy (1970) On Apple album Doris Troy. Song produced by Troy and Beatle George Harrison who also played guitar on it.
- Jerry Vale
- Johnny Ventura
- Slim Whitman
- Roger Whittaker

== Sources ==
- Jacobson, Bob. Les Paul: Guitar Wizard. Madison, Wisconsin: Wisconsin Historical Society Press, 2012.
- Shaughnessy, Mary. Les Paul: An American Original. New York: Morrow, 1993.
- Wyckoff, Edwin Brit. Electric Guitar Man: The Genius of Les Paul. Genius at Work! Berkeley Heights, N.J.: Enslow Publishers, 2008.
