= Los Hermanos Rigual =

Cuban musical group

Los Hermanos Rigual were a Cuban vocal group based in Mexico, mainly active in the 1960s. It consisted of the brothers Pedro, Carlos and Mario Rigual, all natives of Guantánamo.

The trio started performing as guitarists and singers in Havana before moving to Mexico, where they achieved their first successes.

Their first hit was the cha-cha tune "Corazón de melón", which was one of the best-selling songs in Mexico in 1958 and was later covered in English by Rosemary Clooney with the Pérez Prado orchestra, as well as in Japanese by Moriyama Kayoko under the title "メロンの気持".

They had another major hit in 1962, thanks to the song "Cuando calienta el sol" which became an international hit. Following the success of the song for a few years they focused their activities in Europe and particularly in Italy, where they appeared in several television shows and were entered into the competition at the 14th edition of the Sanremo Music Festival. In the late 1960s the trio moved back to Mexico City, where they continued to enjoy some local success.

Carlos Rigual died on 17 November 1994, Pedro on 26 March 2012 and Mario on 1 October 2017.

== Discography ==
=== Albums ===
- 1963: Los Hermanos Rigual (RCA Victor)
- 1965: Guitarra amor mío (RCA Victor)

=== Singles ===
- 1962: "Cuando calienta el sol"/"La del vestido rojo"
- 1963: "Llorando me dormi"/"Envidias"
- 1963: "Cuando brilla la luna"/"Dona cibeles"
- 1963: "Blanca como paloma"
