= Fascination (1905 song) =

Popular French waltz song by Fermo Dante Marchetti and Maurice de Féraudy

Song
- Written: 1904–1905
- Published: 1904 (piano), 1905 (vocal)
- Composer: Fermo Dante Marchetti
- Lyricists: Maurice de Féraudy (French); Dick Manning (English); Armando Louzada (Portuguese)

"Fascination" is a popular waltz song with music (1904) by Fermo Dante Marchetti and lyrics (1905) by Maurice de Féraudy.

It was first published in Hamburg (by Anton J. Benjamin) and Paris (Édition F. D. Marchetti) in 1904 in a version for piano solo ('Valse Tzigane'). As a song with de Féraudy's words, it was first performed by the French music-hall singer Paulette Darty, in 1905, and published the same year.

== Recordings ==
"Fascination"

Single by Jane Morgan and The Troubadors
- B-side: "Fascination (Whistling Instrumental)"
- Released: August 1957
- Recorded: 1957
- Genre: Pop
- Length: 2:22
- Label: Kapp
- Songwriters: Fermo Dante Marchetti, Dick Manning

With its English lyrics, by Dick Manning, "Fascination" was recorded by diverse artists including Dick Jacobs, Nat King Cole and David Carroll, all of whose versions made the charts.

In 1957, two of the more popular recordings of "Fascination" were released, Dinah Shore went to number 15 on the Billboard Most Played By Jockeys chart, while a recording by Jane Morgan was released by Kapp Records (catalog number 191), which proved to become her signature song. It first reached the Billboard charts on 9 September 1957. On the Disk Jockey chart, it peaked at number 7; on the Best Seller chart, at number 12; on the composite chart of the top 100 songs, it reached number 11. In Canada it reached number 4.

== The original French words ==
Je t'ai rencontré simplement
Et tu n'as rien fait pour chercher à me plaire
Je t'aime pourtant
D'un amour ardent
Dont rien, je le sens, ne pourra me défaire.
Tu seras toujours mon amant
Et je crois en toi comme au bonheur suprême.
Je te fuis parfois, mais je reviens quand même
C'est plus fort que moi… je t'aime !

Lorsque je souffre, il me faut tes yeux
Profonds et joyeux
Afin que j'y meure,
Et j'ai besoin pour revivre, amour,
De t'avoir un jour
Moins qu'un jour, une heure,
De me bercer un peu dans tes bras
Quand mon cœur est las,
Quand parfois je pleure.
Ah ! crois-le bien, mon chéri, mon aimé, mon roi,
Je n'ai de bonheur qu'avec toi.

== In popular culture ==
The song has been used in film.

- Sung by Florelle (Odette Rousseau) as "La Môme Crevette" in Alexander Korda's La dame de chez Maxim's (1933)
- In the 1933 film The House on 56th Street by Robert Florey
- It was used throughout the soundtrack of the 1942 French film Chiffon's Wedding
- On the soundtrack of Jean Renoir's The Diary of a Chambermaid (1946)
- The theme was used prominently in Jacqueline Audry's 1949 film Gigi
- It was also popularized in René Clair's 1955 movie The Grand Maneuver
- It was used in the Love in the Afternoon directed by Billy Wilder (1957).
- "Fascination" was sung in the 2007 French film La Vie en rose (La Môme), by Maya Barsony, and is featured on the soundtrack
- The Nat King Cole version was featured in the 2006 film Take the Lead
