= Odette Rousseau =

French parachutist

- Born: 1927; Saigon, French Indochina
- Died: 7 December 2012 (aged 84–85)
- Occupation: Parachutist

Odette Rousseau ([ɔ.dɛt ʁu.so]; 1927 – 7 December 2012) was a French parachutist. She qualified at the age of 23 and became French national champion in 1953 and a world champion in 1954. Rousseau made a world record jump on 25 August 1955 from a height of 8,721 metres (28,612 ft; 5.419 mi). She later attended many Fédération Aéronautique Internationale committees and was appointed an officer of the Legion of Honour.

== Early life ==
Odette Rousseau was born in 1927 in Saigon, French Indochina. Her father was a French engineer and held a private pilots license. In 1946 she moved to Paris, France to further her studies. Whilst at college in 1950 she saw a Ministry of Transport poster advertising aerosports. Rousseau began parachute training at the Saint-Yan Aeroclub where she was the only female member. Her initial 300 jumps were carried out from a parachute tower as she was considered too young to jump from an aircraft. She qualified as a parachutist at the age of 23. Rousseau's parents, still in Indochina, knew nothing about her hobby until they read an article about her training in Paris Match magazine.

Rousseau was trained by former world champion parachutist Pierre Lard and made more than 200 jumps from aircraft between 1950 and 1955. Rousseau participated in the first French Parachuting Championship in 1953 and became French national champion in all categories, ahead of the men (all competition was mixed). She qualified as an instructor the following year and also married Vincent Balési, President of the International Parachuting Commission. Rousseau became a world parachuting champion later that year, again beating men in a mixed category. Throughout this time she had to wear a parachute rig intended for men and weighing 20 kilograms (44 lb), no female version being available. She also had to subsidise her jumps by operating airshows across France and the world. The popular press depicted her as a rival of fellow French parachutist Colette Duval, though this may not have reflected the actual relationship between the two women.

Rousseau found work as a parachuting instructor at the regional training center for Île-de-France, in Gisy-les-Nobles. In 1955 she started training with General Jean Gilles, commander of the French Army's 25th Parachute Division. This was her first experience of military-style static line jumping. She was awarded an honorary military qualification certificate, an uncommon honour for women in this period. As a particular honour the certificate was signed by General Gilles.

== World record and afterwards ==
On 25 August 1955 Rousseau set a new women's freefall parachute world record by jumping from a height of 8,721 metres (28,612 ft) and opening her parachute only at the height of 408 metres (1,339 ft); breaking a record set by Russian parachutist Aminet Sultanova. Rousseau set the record from a French military Nord Noratlas that flew from Brétigny-sur-Orge Air Base and jumped over Saint-Yan. The record was supervised by Aéro-Club de France officials on the aircraft and on the ground. Due to the altitude Rousseau wore an air mask and "was equipped with three flight suits: one in silk, one in linen, and one with fleece lining; three pairs of gloves: two in silk and one in fur-lined leather; one helmet in leather; large antifreeze goggles; an inhalation mask; a portable bottle of oxygen; a little plank board placed on the front parachute bearing two altimeters, the chronometer and the heavy and cumbersome registered barograph of the International Aeronautic Federation (FAI)". Rousseau landed in the River Yonne and almost drowned, being saved at the last moment by a passing bargeman.

Afterward Rousseau was active in the FAI, attending its general conferences as a companion of honour, observer and/or delegate. She was technical secretary of the organisation's parachuting commission from 1967 to 1982. She was awarded honorary FAI membership in 1982 and also received the FAI bronze medal and the Leonardo Da Vinci Parachuting Diploma. She was also appointed an officer of the Legion of Honour by the French government. Rousseau attended her final FAI conference, in Turkey, in 2012 and died on 7 December that year.
