= Ana María González (Mexican singer) =

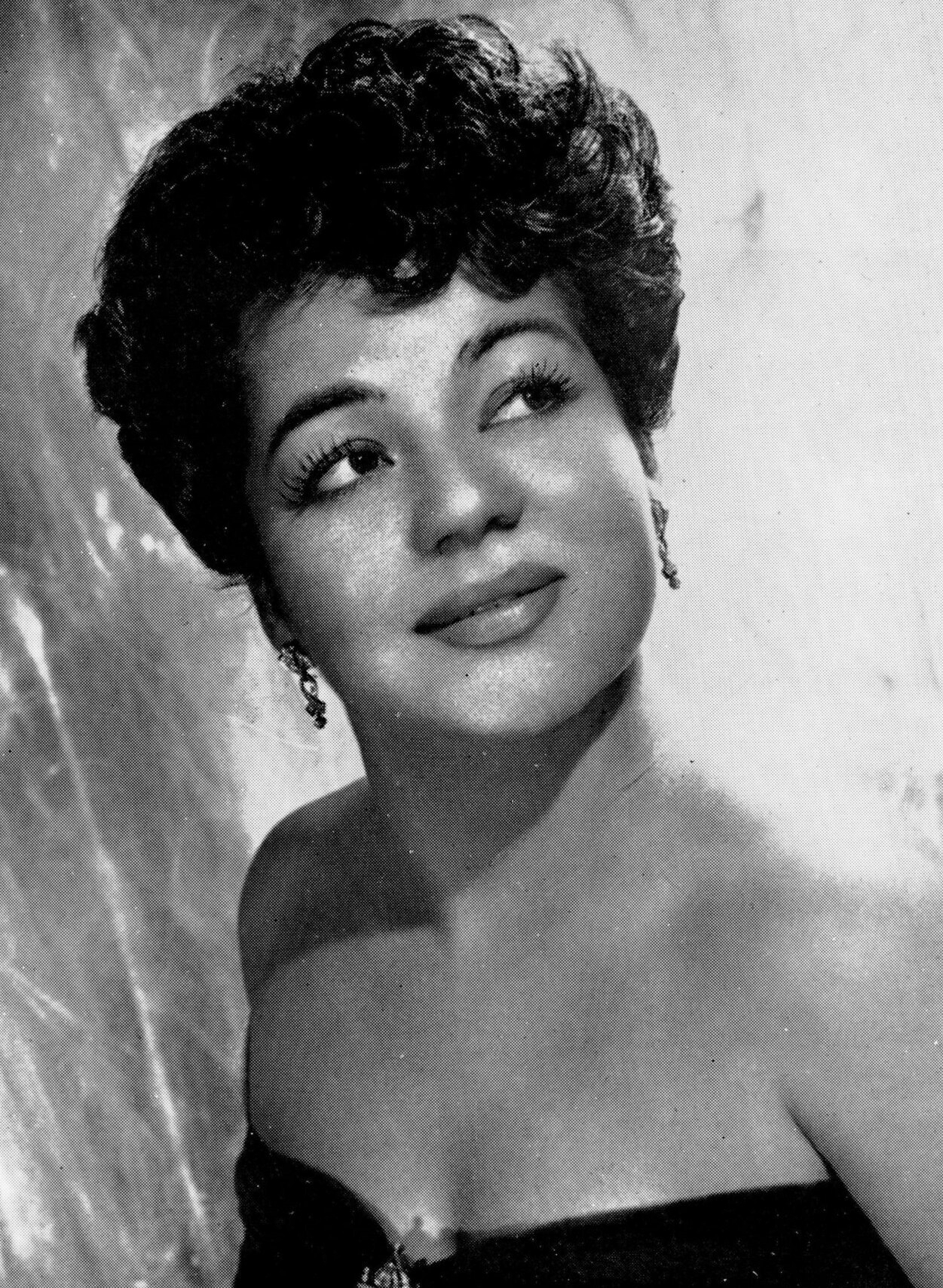
- González in 1954

Background information
- Born: Ana María González Tardos; 31 August 1918; Xalapa, Veracruz, Mexico
- Died: 18 June 1983 (aged 64) Mexico City, Mexico
- Genres: Bolero; ranchera; huapango; beguine; schottische; copla
- Occupations: Singer; voice actress
- Instrument: Vocals
- Labels: RCA Víctor; Orfeón
- Formerly of: Agustín Lara; Pedro Vargas

Ana María González Tardos (31 August 1918 – 18 June 1983) was a Mexican singer, famous throughout Ibero-America and Spain for her recordings and performances. known as The Luminous Voice of Mexico.
