= Frank Domínguez =

Cuban musician (1927–2014)

Frank Domínguez (born Francisco Manuel Ramón Dionisio Domínguez y Radeón on 9 October 1927 in Matanzas, Cuba – died 29 October 2014 in Mexico) was a Cuban composer and pianist of the filin movement. Born in Matanzas, he began to play piano at 8.

His most famous song, "Tú me acostumbraste", was written in 1955 and has been recorded by many singers among them, Olga Guillot, Lupita D’Alessio, Luis Miguel, Chavela Vargas, Pedro Vargas, Caetano Veloso, Luciano Tajoli, Domenico Modugno, Tom Jones, Lola Flores, Sara Montiel, Andrea Bocelli and the Gipsy Kings
