= Rob & Gilly =

Rob & Gilly Bennett were a British husband/wife classical duo playing acoustic revisions of hymns and Christian worship songs since the 1980s. Rob and Gilly have since separated. Rob passed away in 2016.

== Albums ==
Year	Title
1989	Rob & Gilly - Classical Praise Guitar: The Touch
1990	Rob & Gilly - Classical Praise Guitar: Such Love
1991	Rob & Gilly - Classical Praise Guitar: Be Still
1993	Rob & Gilly - Classical Praise Guitar: I Will Seek Your Face
1993	Rob & Gilly - Side By Side
1995	Rob & Gilly - Hymns
1997	Rob & Gilly - The Collection
2000	Rob & Gilly Bennett - The Touch/Such Love
2007	Rob & Gilly Bennett - The Rob & Gilly Bennett Collection
