= Mariano Mercerón =

Cuban musician (1907–1975)

Mariano Mercerón Masó (1907-1975) was a Cuban saxophonist, composer and bandleader. He was born in Santiago de Cuba. In the 1930s, he established his band Mariano Mercerón y Sus Muchachos Pimienta (Mariano Merceron and His Pepper Boys) which consisted entirely of black and mulatto musicians. An important figure in the development of popular music in mid-century Cuba, he worked with Camilo Rodríguez, Benny Moré, Dominica Vergés, Roberto Duany, the Márquez Sisters and the composer Marcelino Guerra. Also active in the Mexican market, he eventually settled there after the Cuban Revolution and died in Mexico City in 1975.
