= Pacho Galán =

Colombian musician (1906-1988)

- Born: Francisco Galán Blanco; October 4, 1906; Soledad, Atlántico, Colombia
- Died: July 21, 1988 (aged 81) Barranquilla, Atlántico, Colombia
- Genres: Porro, cumbia, gaita, merecumbe
- Occupations: Musician, bandleader, composer, arranger
- Instruments: Trumpet, piano, clarinet, vocals
- Years active: 1934–1980

Pacho Galán (1906—1988) was a Colombian composer and band leader of several Colombian music forms. His songs include Boquita Sala, Rio Y Mar, Fiesta de Cumbia, Cumbia Alegre and Ay Cosita Linda, which became one of his most famous after Nat King Cole recorded his own rendition of the song. The song was also covered by La Sonora Matancera, José Fajardo, Rafael de Paz, Billo's Caracas Boys.

== Career ==
In the early 1930s, the Galán family moved to Barranquilla, where Pacho joined the Departmental Band. In 1940, he joined the newly founded Atlántico Jazz Band as an arranger and composer, writing most of the orchestra's repertoire and making his first recording with Discos Tropical. Around the same time, he founded his own ensemble, the "Pacho Galán Orchestra."

After the 1940s joined the newly-created Barranquilla Philharmonic and shortly afterward joined the "Emisora Atlántico" orchestra, conducted by Guido Perla. In 1954, he founded his own orchestra and composed the merecumbé song "Cosita Linda," for which he later became known as "The King of Merecumbé." Beginning in 1955, "Cosita Linda" was recorded by scores of versions by various artists and musicians around the world.
