= Trío Calaveras =

Mexican musical trio

Trio Calaveras
- Also known as: El Trio Calaveras, Trio Los Calaveras
- Origin: Mexico City, DF, Mexico
- Genres: Traditional Mexican music
- Years active: 1931–present
- Label: Puchito
- Members: Jose de la Cruz Pacheco (lead); Jose Luis Garcia Rosales; Luis Miranda Neri
- Website: Trio Calaveras

Trío Calaveras is a Mexican guitar and vocal trio, notable for its performances and recordings with the pop singer Jorge Negrete.

== History ==
Calaveras, in Spanish, means "skulls".

The original members of the trio in the 1930s were Guillermo Bermejo (died 2002), his brother Miguel Bermejo (died 1996) and Raúl Prado (died 1989). Guillermo Bermejo left the Trio and moved to Argentina in 1945 his brother replaced him with Pepe Zaldivar (died 1975).

There are conflicting rumors that Prado had a brief marriage with Mexican actress María Félix, but no concrete evidence has emerged that the marriage ever took place. Most of the rumors agree in claiming that Prado and Félix allegedly got married in 1943 after meeting on the set of The Rock of Souls and separated two months after the wedding. Mexican writer Enrique Serna interviewed the last survivor of the trio, Miguel Bermejo, who told him he was a witness to the wedding. Prado's niece María Escalera also corroborated the marriage, saying that the marriage ended when Agustín Lara sent Félix a white piano as a gift, and "Raúl threw her out — with the piano. They later divorced. So, it appears, María Félix was my tía política [aunt-in-law]." In his book about Félix María Félix: 47 pasos por el cine, Paco Ignacio Taibo I wrote about the marriage as factual, saying "While filming this movie, María would meet Raúl Prado, a member of the Los Calaveras trio. After a quick courtship they got married and shortly after they divorced. This is one of the most carefully protected chapters of the star's life. María's friends keep claiming that it was crazy." Prado's obituary on the Spanish newspaper El País in April 1989 reported the marriage as factual, as did some obituaries of Félix's, such as the one in Argentine newspaper La Nación, the latter which only cited "a biography" as a source. It is known that Félix vehemently denied ever having married Prado. Serna, who also interviewed Félix, said "On our first meeting I asked her about her marriage to Raúl Prado (which she denied until the end) [...] and she told me that if I was going to go on with those lies, we were not going to be able to work on the book."
