= Álvaro Carrillo =

- Born: 2 December 1919; San Juan Cacahuatepec, Oaxaca
- Died: 3 April 1969 (aged 49)
- Genres: Bolero
- Occupation: Composer
- Years active: 1940–1969

Álvaro Carrillo Alarcón (2 December 1919 – 3 April 1969) was a Mexican popular music composer and songwriter, born in San Juan Cacahuatepec, Oaxaca. He wrote over 300 songs, mostly boleros, including the great hits Amor mío, Sabor a mí, Como se lleva un lunar, El andariego, Luz de luna, Sabrá Dios, Seguiré mi viaje and La mentira.

== Early life and education ==
Álvaro Carrillo Alarcón was born in 1921 to a father of Spanish descent and a mother of Indigenous Mixtec and African descent. He came from a very humble family as they lived in extreme poverty . His father owned three cows which he believed made him a "rich" man. Since his father was a farmer who came from a long line of farmers, he was eagerly set on keeping all his sons within his family's business. A young Alvaro was not interested in obeying his father's wishes and would often hide instead of working. Carillo would spend his time reading poetry, as he was fascinated by Greek mythology from an early age. At the age of eight, his mother died. Into his adolescence, he had discovered an interest in the guitar. As he grew older, his musical talent developed following the many types of music while growing up in San Juan Cacahuatepec, Oaxaca.

In 1940, Carrillo enrolled in the National Agricultural School in Chapingo, where he composed his first songs as a student. In 1945, he graduated in Agricultural Engineering.

== Career ==
Carrillo worked in the Corn Commission, but left engineering to become a composer. He became a friend of singer Antonio Pérez Mesa of the Trío Los Duendes. He wrote the song "Amor," for the trio; it rapidly became popular. Carrillo was a prolific composer, writing more than 300 songs during his life; many were boleros, a Mexican-style rhythmic ballad. His career was ended abruptly when he died in a car accident on 3 April 1969. His songs have continued to be covered by Mexican and international artists in the decades since his death.

Mexican romantic pop, ballad and bolero singer Luis Miguel recorded Carrillo's bolero "La Mentira" (The Lie) in Miguel's platinum album, Romance (1990), released by WEA. He later included Carrillo's song "Sabor a mí" in another of his hit platinum albums, Romances (1997), also by WEA.

Mexican musicians and singers know many of the songs from the Álvaro Carrillo songbook by heart. Noted interpreters of his songs include: Javier Solis, Pepe Jara, Trio Los Santos, and Linda Arce.

== Representation in popular culture ==
Álvaro Carrillo's life inspired the film Sabor a mí (1988), directed by René Cardona, in which Carrillo was portrayed by Mexican singer José José.
