= Tony Acquaviva =

American composer

Anthony Acquaviva (May 10, 1925 – September 27, 1986) was an American composer, conductor and string instrumentalist, and the founder of the New York Pops Symphony Orchestra.

Acquaviva was a graduate of the United States Military Academy and served in the Army's orchestral division from 1944 to 1948. As a struggling young musician in New York City, he roomed with singer Guy Mitchell, sleeping on the floor for lack of furniture and once admitted to the press that the refrigerator there contained only one jar of mustard.

He married Joni James in 1956 at St. Patrick's Cathedral in New York City and served as her manager and conductor.

He recorded for MGM Records.

Acquaviva later fell into poor health, and Joni James retired from performing to care for him (and their two children, adopted from Italy) for the last 18 years of his life.
