= Ay Cosita Linda =

Song
- Genre: Merecumbé [es]
- Songwriter(s): Pacho Galán

"Ay Cosita Linda" (translation "oh cute thing") is a popular Colombian song written and performed by Pacho Galán in the merecumbé genre.

In its list of the 50 best Colombian songs of all time, El Tiempo, Colombia's most widely circulated newspaper, ranked the version of the song by Pacho Galan at No. 9.

The song was later recorded by multiple artists, including Nat King Cole, Ramón Márquez Y Su Orquesta, Tony Bass y Su Orquesta, Gitta Ravena und Die Rondos, Carlos Argentino Con La Sonora Matancera, Los Machucambos, Malka and Joso, Marimba Chiapas, Los Españoles, Charlie's Roots, Juan Antonio Labra, Trio La Rosa, Bovea y sus Vallenatos, and Los Javaloyas.
