= Rubén Fuentes =

Mexican classical violinist (1926–2022)

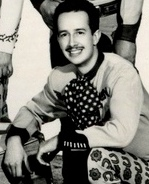
- Fuentes in 1950

Background information
- Born: Rubén Fuentes; 15 February 1926; Ciudad Guzmán, Jalisco, Mexico
- Died: 5 February 2022 (aged 95)
- Genres: Mariachi
- Occupations: Musician, composer
- Instrument: Violin
- Formerly of: Vargas de Tecalitlán, Linda Ronstadt, José Alfredo Jiménez

Rubén Fuentes (15 February 1926 – 5 February 2022) was a Mexican classical violinist and composer who was best known for his contributions to mariachi music.

== Biography ==
In 1944, Fuentes joined Mariachi Vargas de Tecalitlán as a violinist and later as a music arranger. In 1955 he stopped performing in the group, but he maintained his position as producer, musical arranger and musical director.

As such, he had a profound influence on Mariachi Vargas de Tecalitlán and mariachi music in general. He is best known for his work on Linda Ronstadt's classic, Grammy award-winning, multi-platinum Canciones de Mi Padre album. With domestic sales of 2.5 million copies, Canciones de Mi Padre stands as the biggest-selling non-English language record in US history.

Fuentes wrote dozens of Mexican standards, including "La Culebra", "Cien Años", "Las Alazanas", "Como Si Nada", "La Bikina", "Que Bonita Es Mi Tierra", "Flor Sin Retoño", "Ni Princesa Ni Esclava" and "Camino Real de Colima" (many composed with Silvestre Vargas). Fuentes also produced several of Linda Ronstadt's traditional Latin albums. His songs have been performed by Pedro Infante, Miguel Aceves Mejía, Flor Silvestre, Amalia Mendoza, Marco Antonio Muñiz, Javier Solís, Vikki Carr, and Hatsune Miku, among others.

Fuentes was the musical director of RCA Records in Mexico during the late 1950s to the late 1960s. For that reason, he was the arranger and musical producer of many records of major ranchero singers. Most of them were accompanied by Mariachi Vargas de Tecalitlán. Fuentes was also the musical arranger for most of José Alfredo Jiménez's songs, a prolific Mexican-born composer whose compositions, like Fuentes, elevated traditional Mariachi music to international heights and acclaim.

Fuentes died on 5 February 2022, at the age of 95.
