= Fermo Dante Marchetti =

Italian composer and songwriter

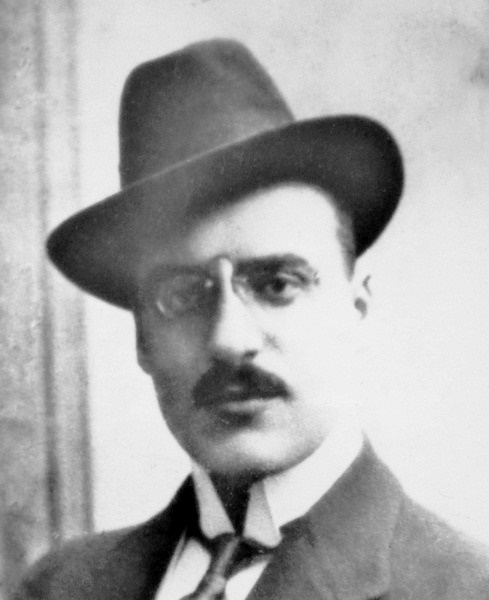
- Born: Dante Pilade Marchetti; 26 August 1876; Massa Carrara, Tuscany, Italy
- Died: 11 June 1940 (aged 63); Paris, France
- Occupations: Composer, songwriter
- Notable work: "Fascination"
- Style: Waltz

Fermo Dante Marchetti (born Dante Pilade Marchetti; 28 August 1876 – 11 June 1940) was an Italian composer and songwriter, best known for the music for the song "Fascination". He was born in Massa, Piazza della Conca, (Massa Carrara, Tuscany, Italy) and died in Paris, France.
