= Alfredo Carrasco =

Mexican composer (1875–1945)

- Born: Alfredo Carrasco Candil; May 4, 1875; Culiacan
- Died: December 31, 1945 (aged 70); Mexico City
- Occupation: Composer

Alfredo Carrasco Candil (4 May 1875, in Culiacan – 31 December 1945, in Mexico City), was a Mexican composer.
