= Alberto Beltrán (singer) =

Dominican singer

Alberto Amancio Beltrán (Palo Blanco, La Romana, 5 May 1923 - Connecticut, 2 February 1997) was a Dominican singer, known as "El Negrito del Batey", after his first signature tune. He mainly sang in the genres of bolero, son montuno, mambo, merengue, and guaracha. After recording in the Dominican Republic with René Hernandez' orchestra, he moved to New York City in 1961 to work with La Sonora Matancera.

== Early years ==
Beltrán was born in the town of Palo Blanco, in the province of La Romana, Dominican Republic. As a child, he barely achieved basic education since his family's economic situation forced him to sell candy on the streets. At the age of fourteen he was attracted to music and debuted as an amateur singer on the radio. This first artistic foray led him to take singing classes.

From 1946 to 1951 he belonged to several groups in his country, such as "Brisas de Oriente." Later, he formed his own group called "Dominican Boys."

== International Projection ==
In 1951 he emigrated to Puerto Rico. There, he recorded the song "El 19" with "Los Diablos del Caribe", Mario Hernández's group. Later he traveled to Cuba, first he visited to Santiago and then to La Habana on July 15, 1954, to work with the Puerto Rican singer-songwriter Myrta Silva on Radio Mambí.

On August 16th of that same year, he was requested by Sonora Matancera and recorded the composition Ignoro tu existencia by Rafael Pablo de la Motta and Although it costs me life by the inspiration of the Dominican Luis Kalaff. Both songs, to the rhythm of a bolero, were recorded on the same 78 r disc. p. m.

On November 16th, he recorded the merengue "El negrito del batey" composed by Medardo Guzmán, which catapulted him internationally by becoming a bestseller. From there came the nickname with which he became popular. That same day he also recorded the boleros "Todo me gusta de Ti" by the author Cuto Esteves, "Enamorado de la inspiración" by José Balcalcer and, for the second time, "El 19" by Radhamés Reyes Alfau.

On January 18th, 1955 he recorded his last pieces with the Orquesta Sonora Matancera. Later, he spent time in Venezuela where he left phonographic records with the orchestras "Sonora Caracas", Los Megatones de Lucho and the Orquesta de Jesús "Chucho" Sanoja. Hired by the Dominican musician living in Venezuela, Billo Frómeta, he participated in two albums recorded in studios in Cuba: "Evocación" (1956) in which he performed as a soloist and "La Lisa-Maracaibo", in which he shared credits with the singer. Cuban Carlos Díaz.

He died on February 3rd, 1997, of an acute cerebrovascular disease, in the city of Miami, United States. He was buried with honors in the Dominican Republic.

== Discography ==
- El Negrito Del Batey Alberto Beltrán, Conjunto Casino - Panart 1958
- Regresa Seeco Records 1960
- Caliente y Sabroso Alberto Beltrán con Daniel Santos y Bienvenido Granda - Tropical 1960
- En Viaje Tropical TRLP-5088 1960
- Nuevo Triunfo Alberto Beltrán con René Hernandez y Su Orquesta* - Seeco Records 1961
- El Único Alberto Beltrán con La Sonora Matancera y Otros - Tropical 1961
- La Voz Del Caribe, Musart DM 1138 1965
- Quiero Saber Tropical 1966
- Canta Sus Mejores Exitos Alberto Beltrán con La Sonora Matancera - Seeco Records 1970
- Merengues Con Mariachi Alberto Beltrán Con El Mariachi México de Pepe Villa* Discos Gas G-4084 1973
