= Larry Russell =

Larry Russell (October 14, 1913 – February 14, 1954) was an American composer working mostly in the motion picture industry. He is widely remembered as being one of three writers of the song "Vaya Con Dios", which has been recorded over 500 times.

Russell was born in Indiana and had early success with the 1941 song "Oh For Heaven's Sake", recorded on Bluebird Records by Alvino Rey. In 1952, he collaborated with Inez James and Buddy Pepper on "Vaya Con Dios".

In 1972, eighteen years after his death and twenty years after the film's first release, he won an Oscar for his score for the Charlie Chaplin film Limelight. (The film was released in 1952, but was not shown in Los Angeles until twenty years later. Under the rules in effect at the time, it was eligible for that year's Academy Awards.)

Lawrence S. Russell died in Los Angeles on February 14, 1954.
