= Buddy Pepper =

- Publicity Photo of Buddy Pepper

Background information
- Born: Jack Retherford Starkey; April 21, 1922; La Grange, Kentucky, U.S.
- Died: February 7, 1993 (aged 70) Sherman Oaks, California, U.S.
- Occupations: Songwriter, composer, arranger, actor
- Years active: 1930s–1960s

Buddy Pepper (born Jack Retherford Starkey, April 21, 1922 – February 7, 1993) was an American pianist, songwriter, arranger and actor, known as one of three writers of Billboard's top tune of 1953, "Vaya Con Dios," which has been recorded over 500 times. He also wrote several songs for Universal Pictures' films, including Mister Big (1943). In 1959, he wrote the title song for the Oscar-winning film Pillow Talk, which actress Doris Day sang during the opening credits.

In addition to his contributions in the film industry, Pepper was also known as the piano accompanist, arranger, and even vocal coach of such stars as Judy Garland, Margaret Whiting, Marlene Dietrich, Smilin' Jack Smith, and Lisa Kirk.

== Early life ==
Buddy Pepper was born to Jack Retherford Starkey in La Grange, Kentucky, on April 21, 1922. He took up piano without taking any lessons when he was only five years old, learning songs by ear alone, including the difficult ragtime tune "Twelfth Street Rag." He showcased his musical gifts around the age of seven, playing piano and singing on stages throughout his hometown. In 1930, he had his own "song and piano program," airing every week on local Louisville radio station WHAS. At age eleven, he performed as the star piano soloist in the Steedman Philharmonic Club at the Brown Hotel in Louisville, playing Mozart's D Major Piano Concerto. Starkey and another local child performer, Florence Krauss, often appeared together at different events throughout the city, even performing at the B. F. Keith owned Rialto Theatre in Louisville.

The two soon earned a letter of introduction from a Louisville dramatic critic and went to audition at RKO Pictures in Hollywood. When rejected by the studio, they created their own vaudeville act with Jack Pepper and titled the show "Buddy and Florence Pepper." It was at this time that Starkey first went under his stage name "Buddy Pepper."

After their act ended, Starkey and Krauss appeared on Major Bowes Amateur Hour in New York in July 1936, where Mr. Bowes liked them so much that he offered them a job with a local Manhattan band, though child labor laws prevented them from accepting. After their appearance on Amateur Hour, the two returned to California at the request of Jack Pepper and again performed their vaudeville act, until both were eventually discovered by Universal Pictures. Buddy Pepper, as he chose to be referred throughout his Hollywood career, gained his first acting role in the 1938 film That Certain Age, starring Deanna Durbin and Jackie Cooper.

== Acting ==
Once established in California, Pepper began attending Ma Lawlor's Professional School, located off Hollywood Boulevard, where he met and became friends with actress Judy Garland. While going to school, he continued to further his career on screen alongside other child stars in Hollywood. His first big role was in the Paramount Pictures film Seventeen (1940), starring Jackie Cooper. A year later, he gained a starring role in Disney's film The Reluctant Dragon (1941), playing Humphrey the studio guide alongside Robert Benchley.

Shortly after the hit Broadway musical revue Meet the People opened on December 25, 1939, Pepper joined the cast on its nearly two-year run throughout the cities of Los Angeles, New York City, Chicago, and San Francisco, among others. During his tour with the show, Starkey met actress Jane Withers following a performance which she attended. Pepper was then cast in the Twentieth Century Fox films Golden Hoofs (1941) and Small Town Deb (1941), both starring Withers herself.

His final movie role was in the 1942 film Reap the Wild Wind in an uncredited role. In 1956, he appeared in an episode of the TV series Front Row Center.

== Military career ==
From 1942 to 1945, Pepper served in the military. He was first stationed at Fort MacArthur in California, during which time he and other servicemen performed in an "all-soldier" revue titled Hey, Rookie. After the revue's conclusion, he went on a 12,000 mile tour that included stops to entertain soldiers serving as bases in Alaska, northern Canada, and the Arctic Circle. He then started another tour throughout the Air Transport Command Ferrying Division bases after he was selected as one of "the three top entertainers" in the ATC.

During his time at the New Castle Army Air Base in Wilmington, Delaware, Pepper was the announcer of a radio show titled the "All Sports Show," which hosted his former co-star Jane Withers, among other popular names, in order to attract attention and raise funds for the creation of a service club at the air base.

Pepper was discharged in October 1945 and returned to his career in Hollywood.

== Music ==
=== Early Years (1939-1951) ===
Through his association on screen with Jackie Cooper, Pepper joined Cooper's swing band, named the Clam-Bake Cats, in 1939, with himself providing piano accompaniment and vocals, Cooper playing the drums, and Leonard Sues playing the trumpet.

He began writing and composing his own songs soon after arriving in Hollywood. In 1942, composer Duke Ellington performed Pepper's song "What Good Would It Do?", featuring Herb Jeffries on vocals. Pepper frequently collaborated with fellow songwriter and composer Inez James, many of their songs appearing in the Universal Pictures' films When Johnny Comes Marching Home (1942), All By Myself (1943), Top Man (1943), You're A Lucky Fellow, Mr. Smith (1943), This is The Life (1944), and Senorita from the West (1945). In 1943, Pepper and James composed the musical score for the film Mister Big, in which Donald O'Connor starred.

Following his service in the military during World War II, Pepper wrote the song "Don't Tell Me" for Metro-Goldwyn-Meyer's 1947 film The Hucksters, starring Clark Gable. Ava Gardner performed the song in the film, though Eileen Wilson provided the vocals for her. In 1947, Margaret Whiting recorded the song as well. Another song by Pepper and James was released the same year, titled "Now You've Gone and Hurt My Southern Pride" and recorded by Phil Harris with his orchestra.

In 1949, Pepper, along with composer Earl Brent, wrote the musical revue titled Tongue in Cheek, which ran for two months at the Las Palmas Theater in Los Angeles. A few years later, in 1954, Pepper composed and wrote a few songs with James for another musical revue titled That's Life, which ran for 18 weeks at the same theater before opening in San Francisco and Oakland in the fall.

In 1950, Frank Sinatra sang Pepper and Richard A. Whiting's song "Sorry" as did Eddie Fisher, Margaret Whiting, and Bing Crosby.

=== Europe Tour with Judy Garland (April–September 1951) ===
In March 1951, Pepper agreed to accompany Judy Garland on a six-month tour throughout Europe in her first return to the stage since her film career had begun 14 years earlier. The tour began in London, England, at the Palladium on April 9 in front of a crowd of approximately 2,500 people. Pepper later recalled that the success of Garland's performance that night was viewed by local media in London as being "the greatest ovation ever given an American artist." However, towards the end of opening night, as Garland began to exit the stage, she suddenly tripped and fell. Pepper rushed from the piano to lift her to her feet, and both laughed it off, Garland even calling it "one of the most ungraceful exits" there ever was. A couple of weeks later, a picture of Pepper helping Garland up after her fall was printed in the April 23rd edition of LIFE Magazine.

Throughout the rest of the tour, he and Garland appeared in England, Ireland, and Scotland, performing at the Palladium and the Palace Theatre in Manchester, as well as in the cities of Glasgow, Dublin, Edinburgh, and Birmingham.

During an earlier appearance in the tour, Garland, before singing the song "Just One Of Those Things," introduced Pepper to the audience, saying, "Before I go any further, ladies and gentlemen, I'd like to introduce you to a young man without whom I'd be completely lost, my love, Buddy Pepper."

=== Later Years (1951-1960) ===
Upon his return from Europe, Pepper began his accompaniment to Lisa Kirk, as well as to Smilin' Jack Smith. During his partnership with Kirk, which lasted for several years, he appeared at the Persian Room of the Plaza Hotel, at the hotel and casino El Rancho Vegas off the Las Vegas Strip, and at the Palmer House in Chicago, as well as other popular nightspots throughout the country. With Smith, he toured the cities of New York, Detroit, Toronto, Washington, Denver, Buffalo, San Diego, Winnipeg, and Vancouver, playing in such spots as the Statler Hotel in Detroit, Michigan.

In January 1952, Warner Bros. purchased Pepper and James' song "Ole St. Nicholas," originally recorded by Doris Day in 1949. It was sung by Day in the movie The Winning Team (1952), in which she starred alongside Ronald Reagan.

In December 1952, Anita O'Day produced one of the first recordings of the song that came to define Pepper's career, "Vaya Con Dios." He was one of the three writers of the song, the other two being his longtime collaborator, Inez James, and film composer Larry Russell. In June 1953, Capitol Records released the Les Paul and Mary Ford recording of "Vaya Con Dios," which almost instantly popularized the song, as it was listed on Billboard magazine's best seller chart by June 13. It remained became #1 hit in August, after which it appeared in the number one spot for 11 weeks, all non-consecutive. By August 4, Paul and Ford's record had sold more than 400,000 copies in three weeks. In November 1953, it ranked at #2 on Variety's popularity list and at #9 among the most popular songs in England.

While "Vaya Con Dios" became the top ranked tune of 1953, "The Song From Moulin Rouge" placed first among best-selling records and those most played on the radio, and therefore is often named as the number one song of 1953. "Vaya" has been recorded more than 500 times by many artists, including acclaimed singers Gene Autry, Nat King Cole, Bing Crosby, and Mel Tormé, among others.

In 1954, Marge and Gower Champion debuted a ballroom dance called the Champion Strut, and the music that accompanied it was composed by Pepper, while the lyrics were written by Robert Wells, who co-wrote the popular "The Christmas Song."

Pepper began to accompany Marlene Dietrich in 1955, playing for her at the Sahara Hotel in Las Vegas for a few weeks.

In 1959, Pepper and James wrote the title song for the film Pillow Talk, which starred Rock Hudson and Doris Day, who sang the title song. The film was nominated for five Academy Awards in 1960, one of which was for Best Music, Scoring of a Dramatic or Comedy Picture. It ultimately won the award for Best Writing, Story and Screenplay.

In 1960, Pepper and James composed the musical theme for the Universal Pictures film Portrait in Black, starring Lana Turner and Anthony Quinn.

In later years, Pepper developed acute arthritis in his hands and was unable to play the piano, though his career had already seemed to have reached a decline years earlier in 1970.

== Awards and honors ==
In 1976, Ralph Edwards from the radio and television game show Truth or Consequences created the "Buddy Pepper Musical Achievement Award," which was presented annually to musically gifted students of Hot Springs High School in Truth or Consequences, New Mexico, beginning in 1976.

In 2005, Les Paul and Mary Ford's rendition of "Vaya Con Dios" was inducted into the Grammy Hall of Fame.

== Death ==
Buddy Pepper died of heart failure on February 7, 1993, at his home in Sherman Oaks, California, at the age of 70. His survivors included two cousins.
