= Eduardo Márquez Talledo =

Peruvian composer (1902–1975)

Eduardo Márquez Talledo (February 22, 1902 - January 29, 1975) was a Peruvian composer.

== See also ==
- Música criolla
