= Inez James =

American composer

Inez James (November 15, 1919 – December 19, 1993), also known as Inez James Walden, was an American composer working mostly in the motion picture industry. She is remembered as being one of three writers of the song "Vaya Con Dios", which has been recorded over 500 times.

Her first film credits were in 1943 as a composer for songs in Mister Big, When Johnny Comes Marching Home, Moonlight in Vermont, and four others. She composed songs for 19 more movies over the years, culminating in work for 1959's Pillow Talk, starring Rock Hudson and Doris Day and 1960's Portrait in Black, starring Lana Turner and Anthony Quinn. She is credited for co-writing the title song from Pillow Talk, sung by Doris Day in the film. The film's score was nominated for an Academy Award for Best Dramatic or Comedy Score in 1959, but it is not clear how the title song related to this nomination.

With Larry Russell and Buddy Pepper, Inez James wrote "Vaya Con Dios", which was a U.S. #1 hit by Les Paul and Mary Ford in 1953.

Inez James died on December 19, 1993, in Sherman Oaks, California.
