= Pedro Vargas =

Mexican singer and actor

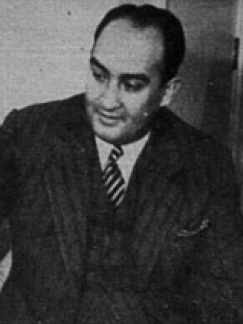
- Vargas in 1941
- Born: Pedro Vargas Mata; 29 April 1906; San Miguel de Allende, Guanajuato, Mexico
- Died: 30 October 1989 (aged 83); Mexico City, Mexico
- Other names: "Nightingale of the Americas", "Song Samurai", "Continental Tenor"
- Occupations: Singer, actor
- Years active: 1928–1989
- Spouse: María Teresa Campos (m. 1931)
- Children: 4
- Musical career
- Genres: Ranchera, Tango, Bolero, Lyrical
- Instrument: Vocals
- Labels: RCA Victor, RCA/Ariola

Pedro Vargas Mata (29 April 1906 – 30 October 1989) was a Mexican tenor and actor, from the golden age of Mexican cinema, participating in more than 70 films. He was known as the "Nightingale of the Americas", "Song Samurai" or "Continental Tenor".

Despite his training in opera, he dedicated his career to popular song, reaching international recognition and becoming one of the main interpreters of Agustín Lara.

== Biography ==
=== Early life ===
Vargas was born in San Miguel de Allende, Guanajuato on 29 April 1906 and died on 30 October 1989, in Mexico City. He was the second of twelve children that José Cruz Vargas and Rita Mata had.

Born into a family of modest means, Pedro Vargas sang in the church choir in his hometown from the age of seven. In 1920, when he was only 14 years old, he came to Mexico City and immediately began singing in the choirs of several churches and giving serenades. It was in Colegio Francés de La Salle where he was given a scholarship to study piano and solfeggio and where he met the composer and tenor Mario Talavera –his guide and mentor– who recommended him to Professor José Pierson. While he was there he met Jorge Negrete, Alfonso Ortiz Tirado and Juan Arvizu. José Mojica also recommended him to Alejandro Cuevas, who offered him free lessons.

=== Career ===
He received the opportunity to participate in the opera "Cavalleria Rusticana" on 22 January 1928, at the Teatro Esperanza, as he had been recommended by Jose Pierson. He traveled to the United States with the Orquesta Tipica (Orquesta Tipica de la Ciudad de México) de Miguel Lerdo de Tejada.

On his first visit to Buenos Aires he recorded two of his own compositions for the RCA Victor label: "Porteñita mía" and "Me fui", with musical backing from pianist Agüero Pepe and the legendary violinist Elvino Vardaro.

On 12 September 1931, he married María Teresa Camo Jáuregui, who came originally from a Querétaro family and with whom he had four children, Pedro, Mario, Marcelo and Alejandro.

He found great success as an interpreter of the composer Agustín Lara, as well as many other composers from Latin America, and enabled their music to traverse diverse countries in the continent, mainly Argentina, Colombia, and Venezuela. With an extensive repertoire that included lyrical songs such as "Jinetes en el Cielo", ranchera songs like "Allá en el Rancho Grande", boleros such as "Obsesión" (sung as a duet with Beny Moré) and nostalgic songs like "Alfonsina y el mar", Pedro Vargas became known as "The Nightingale of the Americas".

== Death ==
Pedro Vargas died due to complications with his diabetes while sleeping and suffered from a heart attack, 30 October 1989, in Mexico City, at the age of 83.

== Discography ==
Long (vinyl)

- El Rey Pedro Vargas – RCA VICTOR – 0107LPA

Tracks

1. – Te Solté la Rienda
2. – Se Me Olvidó Otra Vez
3. – A Donde Va Nuestro Amor?
4. – Mi Paloma Triste #- Volver, Volver
5. – El Rey #- Cruz de Olvido
6. – 16 Años
7. – Eres Tú
8. – Amor de Mi Vida
9. – Que Te Vaya Bonito

- Así Es Mi Tierra Pedro Vargas y La Rondalla Tapatía – RCA VICTOR – 0107LPB

Tracks

1. – Así es mi Tierra
2. – Soy Puro Mexicano
3. – Allá en el Rancho Grande
4. – La Feria de las Flores
5. – Dos Arbolitos
6. – Cielito Lindo
7. – La del Rebozo Blanco
8. – Fallaste Corazón
9. – La Barca de Guaymas
10. – La Huella de Mis Besos
11. – ¿Sabes De Que Tengo Ganas?
12. – Viva México
- Lo Mejor de Pedro Vargas – Vol 1 Pedro Vargas – RCA VICTOR – 0107LPC

Tracks

1. - Mujer
2. – Te amaré toda la vida
3. – Noches de Mazatlán
4. – Esto es felicidad
5. – Te traigo serenata
6. – Aquel amor
7. – Piel canela
8. – Luna azul
9. – Te quiero
10. – Adiós
11. – La negra noche
12. – Obsesión

- Lo Mejor de Pedro Vargas - Vol 2 Pedro Vargas - RCA VICTOR - 0107LPD

Tracks

1. - Quizás, quizás, quizás
2. - Santa # - Que bonito amor
3. - Jinetes en el cielo
4. - Canción mixteca
5. - Por Que ya no me quieres
6. - Por que negar
7. - Acércate más
8. - La flor de la canela
9. – Pecado
10. – Granada
11. – Rosa
- Lo Mejor de Pedro Vargas – Vol 3 Pedro Vargas – RCA VICTOR – 0107LPE

Tracks

1. – Quien será
2. – Lamento borincano
3. – Suerte loca
4. – Cuando vivas conmigo
5. – Despierta
6. – Perdón
7. – Pequeña
8. – Flores negras
9. – Corazón, corazón
10. – La última noche
11. – Amanecí en tus brazos
12. – Adiós Mariquita linda

== Filmography ==
- A Butterfly in the Night (1977) (voice)
- Thank (1975) TV
- Back (1969)
- Retablos of Guadalupe (1967) ... Retablos of Tepeyac (Mexico)
- La Duquesa (1966) TV
- Cucurrucucu Paloma (1965)
- El Study Raleigh (1964) TV
- The singer cricket Cri Cri (1963) (voice)
- The Paper Man (1963) (voice) ... The Paper Man (International: English title)
- Domingos Herdez (1962) TV
- Mexico lindo y querido (1961) ... Beautiful and Beloved Mexico (International: English title)
- Three Black Angels (1960)
- Everyone his music (1959)
- Unforgettable Melodies (1959 ).... Singer
- Flor de canela (1959)
- The Life of Agustín Lara (1959)
- "Estudio de Pedro Vargas, El" (1959) TV
- Bolero inmortal (1958)
- Locos on television (1958)
- Mask of flesh, The (1958)
- Music in the Night (1958)
- Music and Money (1958)
- When Mexico canta (1958)
- Locura musical (1958)
- Feria de San Marcos, La (1958)
- Three bohemianism The (1957)
- Under naked, La (1957)
- Apples Dorotea, Las (1957)
- Zany rock and roll, Los (1957)
- Teatro del crimen (1957)
- "Max Factor, the stars and you" (1957) TV
- Golden Jubilee (1956) ... Golden Anniversaries (International: English title)
- Pensión artists (1956)
- Besos banned (1956) ... Constant Love (Mexico)
- Movida Chueca, A (1956)
- Wet backs (1955 ).... Worker (International: English title)
- De ranchero a businessman (1954)
- Reportaje (1953 ).... Pedro, unemployed singer
- Meat fork (1953 ).... Mocuelo ... Sierra Morena (Italy: Venice festival title) ... Terror dell'Andalusia, Il (Italy)
- Nobody dies twice (1953)
- Piel canela (1953)
- Caribbean (1953)
- Your memories and I (1953)
- Yes .. my life (1953)
- There once was a husband (1953)
- Neither poor nor rich (1953)
- Uncle of my life (1952)
- Forgotten Faces (1952 ).... Singer
- For women who sins (1952)
- The Night Is Ours (1952)
- There is a child in the future (1952)
- Victims of Divorce (1952)
- Del can-can to mambo (1951)
- Burlada (1951 ).... Pedro
- Marquesa the neighborhood, The (1951 ).... Pedro Vargas / Cantante
- In Havana I go (1951)
- It's a Sin to Be Poor (1950)
- Aventurera (1950 ).... Singer
- Also pain is sung (1950)
- I loved that woman, La (1950)
- Lost (1950)
- A Gypsy in Havana (1950)
- Poor Heart (1950)
- Women in my life (1950)
- I want to be bad (1950)
- Abandoned, The (1949)
- Sin for months, Un (1949)
- Eyes of Youth (1948)
- Revenge (1948)
- Here come the Mendoza (1948)
- I killed Alvírez Rosita (1947)
- Fantasía ranchera (1947)
- Morena my copla, La (1946)
- Summer Hotel (1944)... Summer Hotel (International: English title)
- I'm pure Mexican (1942) ... I'm a Real Mexican (USA: Title in English)
- Cavalry of the Empire (1942 ).... Singer ... Imperial Cavalry (UK: Title in English))
- Candida Millionaire (1941) ... Candida, Millionairess (International: English title)
- Laranja-da-China (1940)
- Canto a mi tierra (1938) ... Mexico canta (Mexico)
- Hunger (1938)
- Boys of the press, (1937) ... The Newspaper Boys (USA: Title in English)
