= Eydie Gormé discography =

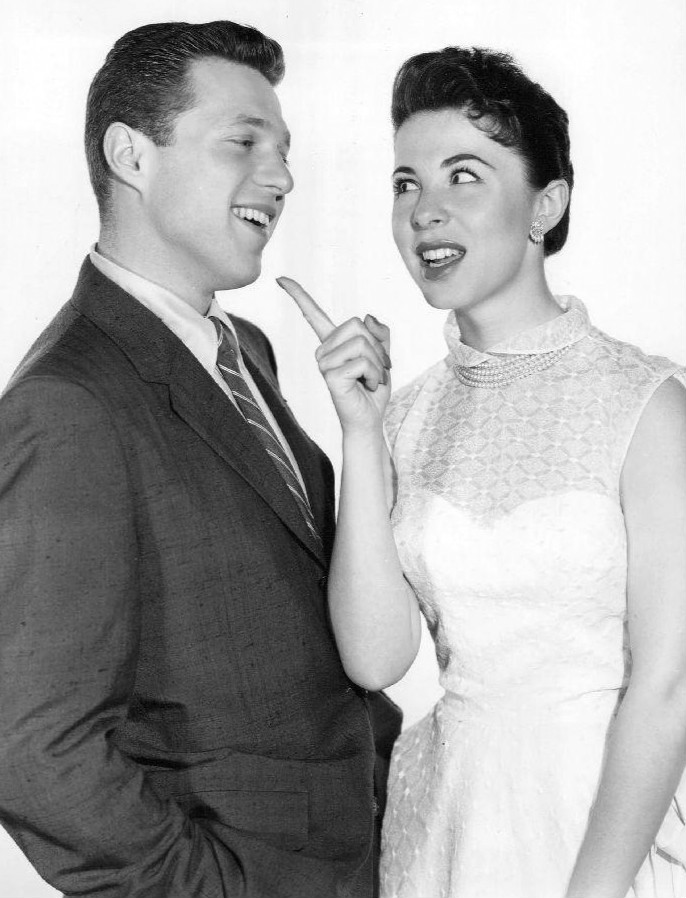
- Eydie Gormé with her husband Steve Lawrence in 1958.
- Studio albums: 35
- Soundtrack albums: 1
- Compilation albums: 13+
- Singles: 52
- Other charted songs: 1

This is the discography of American singer Eydie Gormé. It contains 35 studio albums, multiple compilation albums, 52 singles and other charted songs. Her debut single was 1953's "I Danced with My Darling". It was followed by her single "Frenesí", which marked her first chart appearance, at number 44. "Fini" in 1954 reached the pop top-20. She would continue to have multiple top-40 singles throughout the 1950s.

Her record label ABC-Paramount issued several albums during this time. Two of them were especially noteworthy; Eydie Gorme Vamps the Roaring 20's reached the US pop top-20, and Eydie in Love was nominated for the Grammy Award for Best Vocal Performance, Female. Afterwards, her success dried up and she only scored one hit with "Yes, My Darling Daughter", which had become her biggest single in the UK. In 1963, "Blame It on the Bossa Nova" marked her return to the charts, reaching the top-10 on US pop charts, and top-20 on the R&B survey. An album followed, doing well on the charts as well. In 1966, she earned a Grammy Award for her performance of "If He Walked Into My Life" from the musical Mame. The single release had become her biggest success on the Billboard Easy Listening chart, climbing to the top-5.

Her next releases saw modest chart action, with "Life Is But a Moment (Canta Ragazzina)" also nearly breaking into the main pop charts. In 1969, she signed with RCA Victor Records and got her final big hit with "Tonight I'll Say a Prayer". The song almost cracked the pop top-40 and reached number 8 on the Easy Listening chart as well. She would consistently make the Easy Listening chart in the 1970s. Notably, "Take One Step" also made an appearance on Billboard's Hot Country Songs chart. Since then, several compilations of her recordings and hits have been made.

== Studio albums ==
List of studio albums, showing all relevant details
Title	Album details	Peak chart positions
Title	Album details	US 200
Delight	Released: 1956; Label: ABC-Paramount; Formats: LP	—
Eydie Gorme	Released: 1957; Label: ABC-Paramount; Formats: LP	—
Eydie Swings the Blues	Released: 1957; Label: ABC-Paramount; Formats: LP	—
Eydie Gorme Vamps the Roaring 20's	Released: 1958; Label: ABC-Paramount; Formats: LP	19
Eydie in Love	Released: 1958; Label: ABC-Paramount; Formats: LP	—
Gorme Sings Showstoppers	Released: 1958; Label: ABC-Paramount; Formats: LP	—
Love Is a Season	Released: 1958; Label: ABC-Paramount; Formats: LP	—
Eydie Gorme on Stage	Released: 1959; Label: ABC-Paramount; Formats: LP	—
Eydie in Dixieland	Released: 1959; Label: ABC-Paramount; Formats: LP	—
Come Sing with Me	Released: 1961; Label: ABC-Paramount; Formats: LP	—
I Feel So Spanish	Released: 1961; Label: ABC-Paramount; Formats: LP	—
Very Best of Eydie Gorme	Released: 1961; Label: ABC-Paramount; Formats: LP	—
Best of Eydie Gorme	Released: 1962; Label: ABC-Paramount; Formats: LP	—
Blame It on the Bossa Nova	Released: 1963; Label: Columbia; Formats: LP	22
Let the Good Times Roll	Released: 1963; Label: Columbia; Formats: LP	—
Gorme Country Style	Released: 1964; Label: Columbia; Formats: LP	143
Great Songs from The Sound of Music & Broadway	Released: 1965; Label: Columbia; Formats: LP	—
Don't Go to Strangers	Released: 1966; Label: Columbia; Formats: LP	22
Softly, as I Leave You	Released: 1967; Label: Columbia; Formats: LP	85
The Look of Love	Released: 1968; Label: Columbia; Formats: LP	—
Eydie	Released: 1968; Label: Columbia; Formats: LP	—
Yes Indeed!	Released: 1969; Label: Harmony; Formats: LP	—
With All My Heart	Released: 1969; Label: Harmony; Formats: LP	—
Otra Vez	Released: 1969; Label: Columbia; Formats: LP	—
Tonight I'll Say a Prayer	Released: January 1970; Label: RCA Victor; Formats: LP	105
Melodies of Love	Released: 1970; Label: Harmony; Formats: LP	—
If He Walked into My Life	Released: 1971; Label: Harmony; Formats: LP	—
It Was a Good Time	Released: 1971; Label: MGM; Formats: LP	—
La Gorme	Released: 1976; Label: MGM; Formats: LP	—
Muy Amigos/Close Friends (with Danny Rivera)	Released: 1977; Label: Coco Records; Formats: LP	—
Since I Fell for You	Released: 1981; Label: Applause; Formats: LP	—
Tomame O Dejame	Released: 1982; Label: Profono; Formats: LP	—
De Corazon a Corazon	Released: 1988; Label: Sonotone; Formats: LP, CD	—
Eso Es El Amor	Released: 1992; Label: Sony Latin; Formats: CD	—
Silver Screen	Released: 1992; Label: Musicmasters; Formats: CD	—

== Singles ==
List of singles, with selected chart positions, showing other relevant details
Single (A-side, B-side) Both sides from same album except where indicated	Year	Chart positions						Album
Single (A-side, B-side) Both sides from same album except where indicated	Year	US	CB	US AC	US R&B	US Country	UK	Album
"I Danced with My Darling" b/w "I'd Be Forgotten" (from Eydie Gorme's Delight)	1953	—	—	—	—	—	—	Non-album track
"Frenesi" b/w "All Night Long" (Non-album track)	1953	—	44	—	—	—	—	Eydie Gorme's Delight
"Fini" b/w "Gimme Gimme John" (Non-album track)	1954	19	39	—	—	—	—	Eydie Gorme's Delight
"Sincerely Yours" b/w "Come Home"	1955	—	—	—	—	—	—	Non-album tracks
"Too Close for Comfort" b/w "That's How" (Non-album track)	1956	39	44	—	—	—	—	Eydie Gorme
"Mama, Teach Me to Dance" b/w "You Bring Out the Lover in Me"	1956	34	31	—	—	—	—	Non-album tracks
"Soda Pop Hop" b/w "I've Got a Right to Cry"	1956	—	—	—	—	—	—	Non-album tracks
"I'll Come Back" b/w "It's a Pity to Say Goodnight"	1956	—	—	—	—	—	—	Non-album tracks
"Climb Up the Wall" b/w "Uska Dara"	1956	—	—	—	—	—	—	Non-album tracks
"Be Careful, It's My Heart" b/w "Easter Parade" (from Love Is a Season)	1957	—	—	—	—	—	—	Eydie Gorme
"I'll Take Romance" b/w "First Impression"	1957	65	—	—	—	—	—	Eydie Gorme
"Your Kisses Kill Me" b/w "Kiss in Your Eyes"	1957	53	—	—	—	—	—	Non-album tracks
"When Your Lover Has Gone" b/w "Until They Sail" (Non-album track)	1957	—	—	—	—	—	—	Eydie Swings the Blues
"Love Me Forever" b/w "Let Me Be Loved"	1957	24	29	—	—	—	21	Non-album tracks
"You Need Hands" b/w "Dormi-Dormi-Dormi"	1958	11	21	—	—	—	—	Non-album tracks
"Gotta Have Rain" b/w "To You, From Me" (from Our Best to You)	1958	63	43	—	—	—	—	Non-album tracks
"The Voice in My Heart" b/w "Separate Tables"	1958	88	68	—	—	—	—	Non-album tracks
"Who's Sorry Now?" b/w "Toot Toot Tootsie, Goodbye"	1958	—	—	—	—	—	—	Eydie Gorme Vamps The Roaring 20's
"I'm Yours" b/w "Don't Take Your Love from Me" (Non-album track)	1959	—	—	—	—	—	—	Our Best to You
"Taking a Chance on Love" b/w "The Years Between"	1959	—	—	—	—	—	—	Non-album tracks
"The Dance Is Over" b/w "Too Young to Know"	1960	—	—	—	—	—	—	Non-album tracks
"Be Sure My Love" b/w "I Will Follow You"	1960	—	—	—	—	—	—	Our Best To You
"I Love to Dance (But Never on Sunday)" b/w "Let Me Be the First to Wish You Merry Christmas"	1960	—	—	—	—	—	—	Non-album tracks
"Yours Tonight" b/w "What Happened to Our Love"	1961	—	—	—	—	—	—	Non-album tracks
"Yes, My Darling Daughter" b/w "Sonny Boy"	1962	—	—	—	—	—	10	Non-album tracks
"Before Your Time" b/w "Where Is Love?"	1962	—	—	—	—	—	—	Non-album tracks
"Fly Me to the Moon (In Other Words)" b/w "I'm Yours"	1962	—	—	—	—	—	—	Non-album tracks
"Blame It on the Bossa Nova" b/w "Guess I Should Have Loved Him More" (from Softly, As I Leave You)	1963	7	6	—	16	—	32	Blame It on the Bossa Nova
"Don't Try to Fight It, Baby" b/w "Theme from 'Light Fantastic' (My Secret World)"	1963	53	57	18	—	—	—	Non-album tracks
"Everybody Go Home" b/w "The Message"	1963	80	70	—	—	—	—	Non-album tracks
"The Friendliest Thing" b/w "Something to Live For" (from With All My Heart)	1964	133	—	—	—	—	—	Non-album tracks
"I Want You to Meet My Baby" /	1964	43	65	—	—	—	—	Non-album tracks
"Can't Get Over (The Bossa Nova)"	1964	87	122	20	—	—	—	Non-album tracks
"The Moon and the Stars and a Little Bit of Wine" b/w "Piel Canela" (from Amor, with Trio Los Panchos)	1964	—	—	—	—	—	—	Non-album tracks
"Do I Hear a Waltz?" b/w "After You've Gone" (from With All My Heart)	1965	122	116	—	—	—	—	Non-album tracks
"Just Dance on By" b/w "Where Are You Now"	1965	124	140	39	—	—	—	Non-album tracks
"Don't Go to Strangers" b/w "Mas Amor (More Love)" (from Mas Amor, with Trio Los Panchos)	1965	—	—	36	—	—	—	Don't Go to Strangers
"What Did I Have That I Don't Have?" b/w "Tell Him I Said Hello"	1966	—	138	17	—	—	—	Don't Go to Strangers
"If He Walked Into My Life" b/w "Tell Him I Said Hello"	1966	120	—	5	—	—	—	Don't Go to Strangers
"What Is a Woman?" b/w "Guess I Should Have Loved Him More"	1966	—	—	34	—	—	—	Softly, As I Leave You
"Navidad Y Año Nuevo" b/w "Alegre Navidad" Both tracks with Trio Los Panchos	1966	—	—	—	—	—	—	Navidad Means Christmas
"Softly, as I Leave You" b/w "What's Good About Goodbye?"	1967	117	—	30	—	—	—	Softly, as I Leave You
"How Could I Be So Wrong" b/w "He Needs Me Now"	1967	—	—	22	—	—	—	Golden Rainbow (Soundtrack)
"Life Is But a Moment (Canta Ragazzina)" b/w "What Makes Me Love Him?"	1968	115	—	35	—	—	—	The Look of Love
"This Girl's in Love with You" b/w "It's You Again"	1968	—	—	22	—	—	—	Eydie
"Runaway" b/w "Girl with a Suitcase"	1969	—	—	—	—	—	—	Non-album tracks
"Tonight I'll Say a Prayer" b/w "Wild One" (Non-album track)	1969	45	54	8	—	—	—	Tonight I'll Say a Prayer
"My World Keeps Getting Smaller Every Day" b/w "The Ladies Who Lunch"	1970	—	—	24	—	—	—	This Is Steve & Eydie
"It Was a Good Time" b/w "Mem'ries and Souvenirs" (Non-album track)	1971	—	—	23	—	—	—	It Was a Good Time
"Sal and Sally" b/w "Somebody Waiting"	1971	—	—	—	—	—	—	It Was a Good Time
"Butterfly" b/w "Mr. Number One"	1972	—	—	—	—	—	—	Non-album tracks
"Take One Step" b/w "The Garden"	1973	—	—	47	—	94	—	Non-album tracks
"Touch the Wind (Eres tú)" b/w "It Takes Too Long to Learn and Live Alone"	1973	—	—	41	—	—	—	Non-album tracks
"What I Did for Love" b/w "Can It Ever Be the Same"	1976	—	—	23	—	—	—	Non-album tracks
"—" denotes releases that did not chart or were not released in that territory.
