= Johnny Albino =

Puerto Rican bolero singer

- Born: Juan A. Albino Ortiz; December 9, 1919; Jácana, Yauco, Puerto Rico
- Died: May 7, 2011 (aged 91) Queens, New York
- Genres: Bolero
- Occupation: Singer
- Instrument: Guitar
- Formerly of: Trio San Juan; Los Panchos

Juan Antonio Albino Ortiz (December 9, 1919 – May 7, 2011), also known by his stage name Johnny Albino, was a Puerto Rican bolero singer, born in Yauco, Puerto Rico but lived most of his life in Guayama, Puerto Rico. He played and sang through his youth years. It was not until years later, however, that he would get a chance to sing as part of an organized act. Albino joined the United States Army during World War II, where he formed a quartet and was allowed to sing for his fellow soldiers. In 1946, Albino performed in a trio for the first time. Later on, he would become a member and lead voice of the Trio San Juan, which went on to become an internationally acclaimed group. Trio San Juan was rivaled at the time by the trio Los Panchos for popularity. Albino later on left Trio San Juan and joined Los Panchos, as the leading voice, replacing another legendary trio singer, Julito Rodríguez.

Albino joined Los Panchos in 1958 and he remained there until 1967. The group became famous across the world, and Albino toured the United States, Europe and Japan. With Los Panchos, he recorded Japanese albums, and he also performed alongside well known performers such as Johnny Carson, Frank Sinatra, Sammy Davis Jr. Steve Lawrence and others. Albino left Los Panchos and went on to form, or become a member of many famous Puerto Rican trios. Notably, Miguel Poventud whose participation in the album Los Panchos by Special Request are a compilation of love songs recorded in English for CBS. Also, Grandes Exitos de Johnny Albino con Los Panchos DHIT 2093.2 21 June 2005 is his main performance with Miguel Poventud on "requinto" (guitar) and voice accompaniment. His career spanned over 300 albums and CDs. As an artist, Albino toured Colombia, Peru, Japan, Argentina and Mexico. At 93, he died on May 7, 2011, in Long Island, New York. Albino is a member of the International Latin Music Hall of Fame.

== Musical career ==
=== Early success, Latin American tours ===
Albino joined the Latin programming of radio station WHOM, where he first formed El Trio San Juan (along José Ramón Ortiz and Jaime González) on June 24, 1948, serving as its director, third guitar and lead singer. Within a year his songs were widely known in New York. Their first hits included "Tus Tormentos", "Amor en el campo", "Camino verde" and "María Dolores". In that city they became close to another trio, Los Panchos, holding musical debates against each other. While touring Argentina they recorded the songs "Quien tiene tu amor", "Triunfamos", "Jamás, jamás", "Marinera", "Llámame amor mío", "Cicatrices", "Pa' todo el año", "La media vuelta" and "El Noveno mandamiento". By the late 1940s, the music of Trio San Juan became popular in Puerto Rico and was a recurrent part of WITA's programming. In August 1950, they released "Verdad Amarga" and "Imprescidible". In September 1950, Johnny Albino and the Trio San Juan left for Venezuela, where they performed along singer Carmen Delia Dipiní at the Coney Island amusement park at Caracas. Along presenter Willy Chevalier, they formed the main attraction of a group that would make appearances in South America. Prior to this, they met with Martníez Vela Label representatives Juan Lozano and Totti Juliá and their agent Jaime Taronji. The group became well known outside of Puerto Rico before establishing themselves locally, finding success in New York and Latin America, and due to this they were promoted as "the youngest and most famous trio of America".

In November 1950, Albino and the Trio San Juan announced that they would begin a season of local shows the following year. In January 1951, they recorded Guillermo Venegas Lloveras' march for the 65th Infantry Regiment for New York-based Discos Verne. For their Puerto Rico tour, the group intended to perform at radio, theaters and nightclubs. However, they had issues presenting locally despite being announced by their agent. In February 1951, they released the bolero "Vergüenza". Popular music by Albino was also aired by WIAC and his songs along the Trio San Juan by WNEL and WAPA. While Albino was in New York, rumors that the group was recording under a different name became widespread in Puerto Rico, which were dismissed in a communication by Taronji in which he stated that their productions were only sold under the name "Johnny Albino y su Trio San Juan". In that city, he and Trio San Juan performed along the dancer Mike Vázquez at Teatro Puerto Rico and the RKO brand theaters.

During the spring of 1952, Albino and the Trio San Juan were contracted to appear at Mexico, where they were widely promoted. During the summer, the group began a Latin American tour that included stays at Venezuela, Brazil, Argentina and Mexico. During this time, Albino considered incorporating Dipiní and have her perform along the group in their international appearances. The group adapted songs by composers such as José Manuel Mateo and recorded several popular music LPs. In June 1952, Toño Alfonso assured that they would be making appearances in Puerto Rico in the near future. Later that month, their debut was announced for July, creating expectations among a local fanbase that had grown due to their work abroad. However, once again, their appearance was delayed. Meanwhile, Albino and Trio San Juan spent seven weeks at Argentina, where they appeared at radio for Radioemisora LRI and performed at the El Chanteclé, El Tronio, El Halcón and El Tribidabo clubs. They also met Agustín Irusta, Hugo del Carri and José Razono, and visited the tomb of Carlos Gardel. Albino and the Trio San Juan then made appearances at the Teatro Puerto Rico at New York, joining Antonio Badú, which facilitated a three-film agreement with Azteca Films.

=== Puerto Rican debut and disbandment ===
In September 1952, Petrillo Pomares of the Federación de Músicos de Puerto Rico, the largest union in the local music industry, revealed that despite their intention to also perform in radio, they had only been approved to perform in theaters, cabarets and nightclubs. Unbothered by this, Toronji extended them a contract offer to make their debut later that month. They arrived on September 18, but the flight was delayed due to weather conditions and they took a day off before beginning their schedule, which was comprised by a two-month tour. The radio prohibition announced by Pomares only affected the guitar players, so Albino and the Trio San Juan superseded this limitation by only singing in their weekday appearances for WKAQ (for whom them made their local debut), bringing in the guitarists of Felipe Rodríguez's Trio Los Antares to play. The lack of familiarity and cohesion between both groups was evident in their initial performance, but they managed to air the full program and repeat on a recurrent basis.The group was announced as "proceeding from the principal theaters of Argentina and Venezuela" and as "the most popular trio in all of Latin America".

In September 1952, Albino and the trio debuted a show at the Teatro Oller, Teatro Puerto Rico and Teatro Broadway cinemas. They also performed at the Jack's nightclub and various theaters, including Cobian's Teatro Metropolitan, Teatro Paradise, Teatro San Luis, Teatro Victoria, Teatro Metro, Teatro Rex, Teatro Tanamá and Teatro Kresto-Denia. WKJB at Mayagüez and WPAB at Ponce also transmitted their songs. The three members also took some time off to visit their native towns. Mike Vázquez was expected to join the second month of their tour. Entertainment producer Gilbert Mamery expressed his interest in contracting Albino and the Trio San Juan to make appearances in the theater of Mayagüez. During their stay, Ángel Fonfrías of the Southern Music Publishing Co. and SPACEM received them and discussed business, with Albino noting interest in songs property of the host and Edmundo Disdier, beginning with "Testigo, la luna". On October 8, 1952, they performed at Teatro La Perla at Ponce with full attendance. During this tour, the group debuted the bolero "Delirium Tremens" on radio.

In October, they continued their tour with appearances at the Club Social Las Tres Palmas, where they hosted the floor show. At Teatro La Perla in Ponce, they were joined by Felipe Rodríguez, Arturo Correa and José Miguel Agrelot, selling out two shows. They also made their debut at Mayagüez, performing at Teatro San José. They also played at a dance commemorating the United Nations Day at Clínica Fernández García in Hato Rey. In November, Albino expressed that he was considering extending their stay in Puerto Rico. The group was then contracted to appear at the Club Caborrojeño during the Christmas season. Albino and the Trio San Juan also made appearances at New York during the winter.

In January 1953, they were contracted to participate in four films at Mexico, among which was Luna sobre Borinquen along Tito Puente. During the Korean War, Martínez resisted serving overseas after being drafted, eventually being tracked down by the Federal Bureau of Investigation (FBI) while the trio performed at New York in March 1953. With his lead guitar being sentenced to two years of prison for draft dodging, Albino opted to temporarily disband the group, despite being widely popular at Puerto Rico at the moment. Despite this, they released the boleros "Deuda" and "Si tú me dijeras" two months later. In June 1954, Albino and the Trio San Juan performed at a beach at New Jersey, after which he encountered a car crash involving part of the crew in which guitarist Felipe Acevedo died. By January 1955, Albino and the Trio San Juan had resumed their appearances at WITA, holding the 4:30 time slot for the following months.

In early 1955, Albino returned to Puerto Rico after a tour of New York and joined comedian Fernando Soto’s show at Cobian's Matienzo, Teatro Puerto Rico and Teatro Kresto-Denia. They also made an appearances in television, being featured in WKAQ-TV's prime time Gran Show Libbys, a variety show that had hosted both local and international artists. They were also featured in Adalberto Rodríguez's (also known as "Machuchal") La Taberna India along Soto. When Bayamón opened its 1955 season of the Béisbol Superior, the Trio San Juan was contracted to host the show. In May 1955, Albino was contracted to perform at the Teatro Victoria in Río Piedras and made a return to the show floor of the Club Social Las Tres Palmas. On December 15, 1955, Albino joined Felipe Rodríguez and Los Antares, Tito Rodríguez and other artists in a homage to Ramón Rivero (also known as "Diplo") held at Teatro Puerto Rico in New York while he was on a tour of the city with the Tremendo Hotel troupe. After 15 years of consistently featuring their music in show at WITA, Alvino and the Trio San Juan were included in a cooperation between the station and New York-based WWRL titled Nueva York-Puerto Rico along the Trio Vegabajeño.

Albino and the Trio San Juan made television appearances in shows such as WKAQ's adaptation of La Taberna India. In August 1957, Albino and the Trio San Juan performed at the floor show of the Escambrón Beach Hotel. They also made appearances at The Voodoo Room of the Normandie Hotel and the Escambrón Beach Hotel, frequently sponsored by Cervecería India and performing along its exclusive artist, Indio Araucano. They also joined the singer in radio, performing at WKAQ's Fiesta Musical del Mediodía. Their tour with the artist continued at Teatro Oller and his farewell show at Teatro New Broadway. WITA continued transmitting their music until November 1957. In July 1958, Albino and the Trio San Juan "Sabrás que te quiero" was among the Top-5 songs in Puerto Rico. The following month "Escríbeme" repeated among the local hits, remaining there and climbing to the top spot September. In November 1958, "Vuelve cuando quieras" entered the Top-5 as well. In April 1960, Albino and the Trio San Juan joined actor Carlos Baena while he was the shooting a movie in Puerto Rico, recording songs.

=== Lead singer of Los Panchos ===
Afterwards, the Trio San Juan was dissolved and each went their separate ways, with Albino joining Los Panchos. In 1961, Albino left Puerto Rico for a Latin American tour. In May 1962, he rejoined Los Panchos at Mexico. In November, Albino participated in the first annual dance of the Federación de Músicos de Puerto Rico held at Hotel San Juan in Isla Verde. Albino's integration to Los Panchos was mutually beneficial, providing him with another established platform, while his work as lead singer changed their traditional sound and boosted the sales of their LPs. This trend continued with his work along Los Panchos, with "Jamás, jamás" being the most listened song in Puerto Rico between April and June 1959. Parallel to this, they also released "Se vive una vez" and "Noveno mandamiento". The productions were best sellers at the Río Piedras mercantile center. In October 1959, Los Panchos released a compendium of hits with "Quien tiene tu amor", "Jamás, jamás", "Siete notas de amor", "Marinera", "Primer Mandamiento" and "Noveno Mandamiento" for Columbia. The former of these songs climbed to the top of the Puerto Rico hit parade.

The following month, Albino joined Los Panchos in appearances at Club La Conca, with their local tour being a hit. The group then began an international tour titled "La vuelta al mundo con Los Panchos". The top two songs in Puerto Rico during 1959 were "Jamás, jamás" and "¿Quien tiene tu amor?", while their albums outsold every other artist. During the summer of 1960 and now dubbed The New Trio Los Panchos, released an LP headlined by "Siglo Veinte" and "Vida mía" with Albino as its main voice. While touring the world, Albino began purchasing properties at Puerto Rico with the intent of securing his retirement. During the summer of 1961, the New Trio Los Panchos released a cover of Pedro Ortiz Dávila's "Que el cielo te perdone". After touring Latin America, the group visited Asia gathering success in Japan. Following a brief stay at Puerto Rico, Albino rejoined them for a tour of Europe and later Russia. In August 1963, Los Panchos released an LP that paid homage to composer Rafael Hernández Marín and included their adaptation of the tracks "Silencio", "Desvelo de amor", "Ahora seremos felices", "Perfume de gardenias", "Capullito de alheli" and "Lamento Borincano", which sold well. Meanwhile, the trio also placed "Para todo el año" in the top spot of the local hit parade and "Media vuelta" was a hit.

In September 1963, Albino joined Los Panchos in their return to Puerto Rico, completing a tour with appearances at La Concha, Matienzo, Teatro Oller and Teatro Kresto-Denia. During the spring of 1965, the single "Piel canela", a collaboration between Los Panchos and Eydie Gormé was a Top-5 hit in Puerto Rico. In September 1965, the Teatro Country Club featured his music. During the winter of 1965, Albino joined Los Panchos at the Monte Casino's Señorial room.

=== Producing and performing ===
By the summer of 1966, Albino began publicly announcing that he would leave Los Panchos amongst internal differences, but this decision was delayed on several occasions and he continued playing with the trio in the meantime. Ultimately, he did break with the group in August and announced that he was going to organize his own company and had traveled to New York towards this goal. In that city, Albino quickly resumed his career as a soloist and made appearances in radio, television, theatre and nightclubs. When Albino left Los Panchos, it marked the first time that the trio didn't have a Puerto Rican member. Afterwards, Alvino formed a group named after himself, "Johnny Albino y su Trio", making appearances at Club Caborrojeño. He also began running a business as a producer for other artists, distributing both in the Latin market of the United States and Latin America. Meanwhile, Columbia continued releasing songs that he had recorded before leaving, resulting in songs featuring his voice such as "Celoso" becoming hits for Los Panchos months after. In October 1966, La Riviera Club in Brooklyn announced that Albino would be offering a show at the venue.

In January 1967, Albino joined more than a dozen of artists including Tito Puente, Eddie Palmieri, Celia Cruz, Richie Ray, Ray Barreto, Johnny Pacheco, Joe Valle and Myrta Silva, in a dramatic performance recreating the Latin music scene between the 1930s and 1960s held at Hotel St. George in Brooklyn. During the summer of 1967, his single "Celoso y solitario" was a Top-5 hit at Puerto Rico. His rendition of "Mi Niña Bonita" was second among the songs requested in the Latin American stations of New York during the first week of August 1967. Albino returned to that city, to perform as a soloist act. In December 1967, he released "Llegó la Navidad". That same month Albino and his Trio performed at the Monte Casino along Isabel Sánchez.

In December 1967, Albino travelled to Peru for another tour. He returned to Puerto Rico before Christmas to perform with his trio at the Monte Casino and some theaters for Empresas Chiroldes, as well as some television appearances. On January 7, 1968, Johnny Albino y su Trio participated in a show held at the Plaza de Recreo at Guayama. In May 1968, he released the LP El Triunfador. Albino joined Myrta Silva, Tito Puente, Florencio Morales Ramos, Roberto Cox and others as part of the Poor People's Campaign, participating in a March held at Manhattan during the summer of 1968. While managing his record label, Albino also attended a cocktail party held by Palito Ortega at the Hotel Condado. In November 1968, his rendition of "Veneno" entered the Puerto Rico Top-10 chart and continued in the Top-20 the remainder of the month. In December, "Celeste" (7), "Veneno" (17) and "La tequila llegó" (20) were all among the most popular songs in the island.

In December 1968, Johnny Albino y su Trio were featured in the variety show Rambler Redenvous, which aired through WAPA-TV. In January 1969, they once again performed at the Plaza de Recreo de Guayama. Albino performed at the Terminal Theatre at Brooklyn. During this time, Albino and his Trio made appearances in La Rue at San Juan, including the club's Christmas spectacular. In early 1969, the songs "Regresa a mí" and "Mi novia está enferma" entered the charts. During this time, Albino published both the first entry in what would become his long-running Plazos Traicioneros series and the nostalgic Época de Oro. During the summer of 1969, Johnny Albino y su Trio made a tour to Japan. Afterwards, the group returned to Puerto Rico for a series of shows. On Mexican Independence Day Albino y su Trio performed for the Mexican consulate on Puerto Rico, Carlos Paterme.

In September 1969, Albino and his Trio returned to La Rue for a series of presentations. That month his single "Toma como yo" entered the Puerto Rico Top-50. In October, the song "Uno" debuted in the Top-40 chart before climbing to the Top-20. His album Buenos Aires, el tango y Johnny Albino was also among the five best sold albums. In December 1969, Albino's Navidad was sold in the 8-track format.

During the summer of 1970, Albino released an LP than included the Top-50 hit "Amor Ajeno", "Soñando con Puerto Rico" and "Cuidado". They then participated in activities during the Puerto Rican Week at Rochester. In November, Albino and his Trio made appearances at Súper Club Los Violines at Caparra Terrace. To close the year, they performed at the Espectáculo '70 an event held at the Hiram Bithorn Stadium which was sponsored by the Unión Puertorriqueña de Artistas and featured dozens of local and international acts. His renditions of Rafael Hernández's music was included as part of a three LP collection released by Discos Verne. The Ballet 70 included Albino in the cast of a Christmas presentation held at Teatro Tapia.

On February 5, 1971, Albino was among the artists that participated in an event to raise funds for the Puerto Rico Children's Hospital held at New York and transmitted trough the WADO station. His single "Deja ya de llorar" was a Top-50 hit in the island, climbing to the Top-40 within weeks and entering the Top-25 in April. During the spring of 1971, Albino participated in a 10-day series of shows held at the Hotel Park Sheraton. In April 1972, Albino formed part of the board of the Club Exchange founded at Sabana Grande, joining in as its treasurer. In September 1971, Albino was announced as the oldest competitor (at 52 years old) in the upcoming Festival de la Canción, which also featured other veteran singers such as Marco Antonio Muñiz and upcoming young voices like Rolando Percy. Albino published a second volume of the Época de Oro series. On November 30, 1975, Albino and the Trio San Juan joined Myrta Silva, Lucho Gatica, María Victoria, Looe Balaguer and Virginia López in the retro event “Reviviendo el Ayer” at the Madison Square Garden in New York.

=== Joining Julio Ángel and Los Panchos reunion ===
By 1977, the group was also named "Johnny Albino y su Nuevo Trio" or "El Nuevo Trio San Juan", and was completed by Tatín Vale and Rafael Scharrón. In January 1978, Albino and the Trio San Juan made an appearance in WLII-DT's El Súper Show Goya. In March they made another appearance for the channel, in a special where they played several classics from Albino's repertoire. In August 1981, Albino performed at the Hotel Villas del Abey at Salinas. In 1982, Albino was contracted by Islanda Travel to host a Valentine's Day Dance at the Holiday Inn Hotel at Ponce. After former teammate Chago Alvarado died, Albino and his Trio began a season at the Los Chorritos restaurant, where they sang several of his songs. He continued working with internal tourism firms, offering a Mother's Day show sponsored by Island Tourists in the house of the Phi Delta fraternity at Coamo.

When Julio Ángel held a concert at Bellas Artes in 1985, he recruited him to appear as a supporting act. Despite being initially scheduled for May, Albino had issues traveling from New York to Puerto Rico in time and a member of the Trio Borinquen was unavailable, leading to the event being postponed to June. He later joined Julio Ángel and the group in television appearances in WAPA-TV's Aplausos and Sábado en Grande. Albino, Julio Ángel and the Trio Borinquen became a recurrent act and a special titled Especial de Julio Ángel: Recuerdos was aired by the channel in October 1985, featuring a medley of the Trio San Juan's repertoire and being re-aired later. After this, they made a second appearance for Sábado en Grande.

Albino, Julio Ángel and Trio Borinquen returned to WAPA-TV in December to participate in Especial muy especial 1985, where the best acts of the year were featured. The Institute of Puerto Rican Culture (ICP) and the Centro Cultural José P.H. Hernández contracted Albino to perform in a show for the Festival de las Máscaras at Hatillo. On February 14 and 16, 1986, FAMMA Events organized the Festival Internacional del Trio Los Panchos was held at Centro de Bellas Artes at San Juan and the Palacio de Recreación y Deportes at Mayagüez. The event featured a reunion between Albino and Chucho Navarro, something that was considered very unlikely following the lawsuit, and also included Julito Rodríguez, Alfredo Gil and Enrique Cáceres. In anticipation, he made television appearances in Buenos Días con Eugenia Josefina and Show de Chucho. Botg the current and former members of Los Panchos received an homage at the Capitol of Puerto Rico and were invited to La Fortaleza prior to the event. Albino joined Gil to sing the Japanese song "Sakura" in the press conference and in the event performed as singer. He also rejoined Julio Ángel for another appearance at Sábado en Grande and the Trio Borinquen in “De otra manera con Edgardo Huertas”.

In March 1986, Albino and the Trio San Juan joined Julito Rodríguez, Los Guaracheros and El Trío Borinquen in the Concierto de Trios to raise funds for Ciudad Deportiva Roberto Clemente. When Trío Los Condes celebrated its 25th anniversary, they were invited as accompanying acts alond Daniel Santos, Alpha 4, Trio Borinquen and Trio Vegabajeño. In May 1986, Albino joined the Trio Borinquen for the Concierto Homenaje a la Vejez organized for the elderly by the municipality of San Juan. For Mother's Day, they were contracted by Island Tourists to perform at the Villa Recreo Convention Center. He continued making television appearances with Trio Borinquen in shows such as De otra manera con Edgardo Huertas. Albino sang at the 45th anniversary of Mago's Restaurant. In July 1986, he reunited with Los Panchos and Julito Rodríguez again for a season at the Caribe Hilton's Club Caribe, which they promoted with television appearance in WKAQ-TV's Estudio Alegre and the relaunched Los Kakucómicos. During the fall, Albino performed at the Club Náutico de Miramar and the Holiday Inn at Ponce.

=== Later years ===
In April 1987, he recorded the song Aquel bolero de ayer, aquel bolero de siempre with José Nogueras. He also returned to television with the Trio San Juan for Telemundo's Noche de Gala. When the Música Estival label, the ASCAP and Distribuidora Aponte held a homage show for Nogueras at the Club Tropicoro of the Hotel San Juan, Albino was the guest artist. Both worked together again at La Gran Fiesta Familiar to raise funds for the Puerto Rico Children's Hospital Nogueras and Albino participated in the Noches Borincanas tour, joining Ismael Miranda at the Florida Town Hall and Cheo Feliciano at the Palacio de Recreación y Deportes in Mayagüez. He also continued active in television, appearing in WIPR-TV's Invitados and WKAQ-TV's Kakucómicos, Súper Sábado and Estudio Alegre. Albino and Nogueras participated in the Festival Nacional de la Hamaca held by the municipality of San Sebastián at the Casa Pepiniana de la Cultura. In July they presented the recurring act Romántico y Criollo at Club Tropicoro. During the fall of 1986, Albino joined Bobby Valentín for a show at the Holiday Inn.

He recorded "Aquel bolero de ayer, aquel bolero de siempre" along Nogueras for the 1987 LP Vas a vivir en mí. Both artists expressed that they were enjoying the team up, but the reception was divided. Some in the press that Albino's voice was changing in old age and becoming "spent [and] extremely nasal", while composer Tite Curet Alonso defended them from what he perceived as unfounded criticism. Both continued to perform together regardless of this and joined Willie Colón, Frankie Ruiz, Ednita Nazario, Cheo Feliciano, Eddie Santiago and Tommy Olivencia, among others, in a star-stubbed concert at Cayey's Fiestas Patronales. In 1988, Albino was featured as part of WIPR-TV's Valentines Day special Visitando y Cantando reuniting with Boria, Julito Rodríguez and Avellanet. The Salón de la Fama del Hipismo Puertorriqueño contracted the Trio San Juan to provide the entertainment for its induction ceremony that year. Albino was featured at the 14th edition of the Festival de la Música de Rafael Hernández Marín, which was held in homage to the composer at Aguadilla. CBS Mexico approached him with a proposal to record LPs along Chucho Navarro, which would also include giving him proprietary rights to some of the material from the "golden age" of Los Panchos. After Nogueras published Canciones de vellonera Albino once again joined him, also appearing in Noche de Gala.

In September 1989, Albino returned to the Pichi's Convention Center for the Voces y guitarras event joining Felipe Rodríguez, Los Condes and Los Hispanos. He reunited with Julito Rodríguez and Trio Borinquen at the Encuentro de Trios, a homage for Johnny Rodríguez held at the UPR. In October 1989, Canción de velloneras became a hit in Miami for Albino and Nogueras. In May 1990, he joined Felito Rodríguez, Julito Rodríguez and Orquesta Fiesta in a concert at the El Señorial Convention Center in Ponce. Albino and Rodríguez became a recurring act that also appeared as part of that municipality's Fiesta de la Calle Isabel and in Vega Baja, Naranjito and Sábana Grande in the traveling show Música de Ayer y Hoy. In September 1990, Albino joined Trio Vegabajeño, Trio Borinquen, Los Condes and Johnny Rodríguez in a homage for Julito Rodríguez sponsored by the Puerto Rico Telephone Company. All of these acts joined Lily y su Gran Trio for the Cumbre de Tríos held at Centro de Bellas Artes.

== Personal life ==
His legal name was Juan A. Albino Ortiz and he was born in Yauco, but raised at Guayama. As a child, he often volunteered to sing in class. He had two sisters, Norma and Elvira, and a brother Roberto. His father was José María Albino Quirós, who retired as a police sergeant officer and died in February 1978. As a child, he often volunteered to sing in class. Albino began his artistic career early in life, joining the chorus of the parish in his native Guayama. Afterwards, he became a fixture as a singer in the soirées organized in the town. During the 1930s, Albino debuted in an orchestra when he joined the Caribbean Kids organized by music teacher Adrián Benjamin at Arroyo, Puerto Rico. After completing his primary education, Albino began attending law school, but he ultimately decided to drop out in order to become a full time artist. Albino married Anna Maracotta on March 30, 1946 at Guaynabo. The couple had a boy together and a Bayamón court granted the divorce on March 25, 1949. In 1963, Maracotta requested child support in a New York court and the case was translated to San Juan, where the presence of Albino, who was on tour at the moment, was requested. During the peak of his career, he was married to Sally López.

He lived parts of his adult life at New York and at Calle Derbec in Country Club, San Juan. In 1964, Albino's daughter Jana was born, inspiring him to write “La niña bonita”. He also sired Joan, Jacqueline, Jean Mary, Jeannette and John Anthony. He also had a granddaughter, Cindy. Besides internal issues between the members, Albino left Los Panchos to spend more time with his family at the urging of his wife María. However, Albino grew weary of this retirement from the business and began recording by himself. Besides bolero and the romantic genres, Albino collaborated and recorded with Ernestina Reyes, also known as La Candelaria, an artist specializing in Puerto Rican traditional music. He also joined Maritza Olivo andperforming in the variety theatre.

== Legacy ==
In March 1955, the Sociedad de Hijos y Amigos Ausentes de Guayama (SHYAG) held a homage that included several figures of the arts and press that were recognized as bringing prestige to the municipality of Guayama, among whom Albino was recognized. Singer Carlos Vélez joined Félix Martínez Martínez and Lorenzo Álvarado to pay homage to Albino and his days with the Trio San Juan. In 1973, the Radio Puerto Rico chain composed by WQSB, WPRP and WORA included his repertoire in its lineup. On October 20, 1973, WKAQ held a 12-hour marathon of Albino and the Trio San Juan's music in the "Pasadía Musical" weekend block. By the 1980s, Albino was regarded as "a giant of Puerto Rican popular music" and a "legendary figure" that was successful "on his own merits". Among collectors, there was debate regarding who was a better singer between him and other contemporary voices, such as Hernando Avilés. Author Pedro Malavet Vega included the Trio San Juan as a reference in his musically-oriented 1984 history book La vellonera está directa. In 2000 he was inducted into the International Latin Music Hall of Fame.

== See also ==
- List of Puerto Ricans
