= ¡Ay, Jalisco, no te rajes! =

Song
- Released: 1941
- Genre: ranchera song
- Songwriters: Manuel Esperón (music); Ernesto Cortázar Sr. (lyrics)

"¡Ay, Jalisco, no te rajes!" or in English Jalisco, don't back down is a Mexican ranchera song composed by Manuel Esperón with lyrics by Ernesto Cortázar Sr. It was written in 1941 and featured in the 1941 Mexican film ¡Ay Jalisco, no te rajes!, after which it became an enormous hit in Mexico. The melody of the song was used for the title song of the Disney film The Three Caballeros. Both songs have been recorded by many artists.

== Analysis ==
The song envisions a romance between the Mexican state of Jalisco and its capital city of Guadalajara. In their book Writing Across Cultures: Narrative Transculturation in Latin America, Ángel Rama and David Frye posit that the song portrays the common stereotype of Jalisco being "a paradigm of 'Mexicanness'.

Though part of the ranchera genre, the song has the rhythmic patterns of a polka. Mariachis will often include the song in their repertoire, and in the Southwestern United States, a modified two-step associated with conjunto music may be danced to it.

== Versions ==
The song has been covered by many different artists including Vicente Fernández, Aidá Quevas, Plácido Domingo, Lola Beltrán, Julio Iglesias, Trío Los Panchos, El Charro Gil y Sus Caporales, Francisco Canaro Jorge Negrete his grandson Lorenzo Negrete and Pedrito Fernández.

Texas A&M University–Kingsville uses the song, under the name Jalisco as their official fight song.

In 1962 John Buck & His Blazers had an instrumental hit in Germany and Austria with their version of "Jalisco". This success quickly inspired a German vocal version titled "Gaucho Mexicano" by Renate & Werner Leismann which turned out to be a smash hit in both countries.

The song is featured in the 1943 film Here Comes Kelly.

The 2012 film Mariachi Gringo, that sees a young American man travel to Mexico in the hopes of becoming a successful mariachi performer, features the song. The song is performed by the lead character, played by Shawn Ashmore.

== The Three Caballeros ==
After the international success of Saludos Amigos, The Walt Disney Company set out to make a sequel, titled The Three Caballeros. While Mexico was not a featured country in Saludos Amigos, The Three Caballeros made extensive use of the country and Walt Disney personally asked Manuel Esperón to collaborate on the Mexican portions of the film. The title song of the film used the same melody as Esperón's song "Ay, Jalisco, no te rajes!", with new English lyrics written for it by Ray Gilbert. While these English lyrics were not a translation of Ernesto Cortázar's Spanish lyrics nor were they similar to them in any way, the chorus of "Ay, Jalisco, no te rajes!" is sung in its original language.

=== Covers of The Three Caballeros ===
On the official soundtrack of "The Three Caballeros", the song was sung by Ray Gilbert with Charles Wolcott and his Orchestra.

Italian Male Duo Singer Patrizzio Paganessi and Mario Moro of Patrice et Mario covered Le trois caballeros album Antholigie 1945 -1960 or Anthology 1945 - 1960.

Bing Crosby and The Andrews Sisters recorded a version of "The Three Caballeros" which reached #8 in the 1945 charts.

Fictional music group Alvin and the Chipmunks covered the title song, "The Three Caballeros," for their 1995 Disney-themed album When You Wish Upon a Chipmunk; however, The Walt Disney Company neither sponsored nor endorsed the album the song was featured on.

Other notable artists to record this version of the song include Edmundo Ros, The Fleetwoods, Santo & Johnny, Roland Shaw, and Vic Schoen.
