= Lilongo =

"Lilongo" is a Mexican song written by Felipe "El Charro" Gil. The song is written in the Son Jarocho style of music, a traditional style of the southern region of Veracruz which combines Spanish, indigenous, and African musical elements. "Lilongo" was copyrighted in the U.S. in 1946, though it was first recorded in the U.S. in 1938. It is most notable for its inclusion in the film The Three Caballeros.

== Covers ==
"Lilongo" was recorded by Felipe Gil y Sus Caporales in 1938. It was also recorded by the Trío Los Panchos, a group which included Felipe's brother Alfredo Gil for their 1945 album "Mexicantos".

== The Three Caballeros ==
Lilongo was performed by Trío Calaveras in the 1944 Disney film The Three Caballeros. In the film, the Mexican rooster Panchito takes Donald Duck and José Carioca to Veracruz where he shows them a group of people singing and dancing to the "Lilongo". Donald attempts to join in the dance, but after being made fun of by José he has the musicians play the Jitterbug. The musicians return to playing the "Lilongo" before Donald and his friends leave.
