= Felipe Gil =

Mexican musician

- Born: Felipe Bojalil Gil; 1913; Misantla (Veracruz), Mexico
- Died: 1956 (aged 42–43)
- Other name: El Charro
- Occupation: Singer-songwriter
- Spouse: Eva Garza
- Children: Felipe Gil Jr.

Felipe Bojalil Gil, better known Felipe Gil or by his nickname El Charro, was a Mexican singer and songwriter of the Golden Age of Mexican cinema. He was born in Misantla (Veracruz), in 1913, into a family of musicians and he studied the music of the area. He worked for a time with Álvaro Ancona and in 1936 they were joined by Jesús "Chucho" Navarro, forming the group El Charro Gil y Sus Caporales. In 1940 Ancona was replaced by Felipe's brother Alfredo Gil. They disbanded in 1944, when Chucho Navarro and Alfredo Gil left the group to form the Trío Los Panchos with Hernando Avilés.

In 1939, Felipe Gil married the Mexican American vocalist Eva Garza after they met during Garza's concert tour in Juarez, Mexico. The pair later relocated to New York City, where they eventually raised three children before divorcing in 1953. Felipe Gil occasionally collaborated with his wife in his performances with Sus Caporales. They also recorded several boleros for Columbia Records (Catalogue # 1613-C) including: Diez Años - Rafael Hernández and Eso Si... Eso No - Felipe "El Charro" Gil.

One of Gil and Garza's children, Felipe Gil Jr., had a successful career performing in film, television, and theater.

== Discography ==
Los Angeles October 7, 1938 as "El Charro Gil y Sus Caporales (Navarro y Alvarez)"

- Eso Si Como No (Felipe Gil)
- Lilongo (Felipe Gil)
- Tú Dirás (Pedro Galindo)
- Ya Ves Que Si, Pos No (Guillermo Bermejo)
- El Rey Del Aire (arranged by Chucho Navarro)
- El Pejul (Felipe Gil)
- El Arreo (Lorenzo Barcelata)
- El Tejoncito (S. Briceño)
- Nomás Hágame Jalón (Chucho Navarro)
- Camioncita Flecha Roja (Raful Crayen)
- Si O Si (Miguel Prado)
- La Grandota (Chucho Navarro)

Los Angeles October 18, 1938 as "El Charro Gil y Navarro"

- El Cascabel (Lorenzo Barcelata; arranged by Gil and Navarro)/ftpm "Huapango" (1938)
- La Cucaracha (arranged by Gil and Navarro)
- Hay Que Ponerse Muy Chango (Felipe Gil)/ftmp "A La Orilla De Un Palmar" (1937)
- El Parrandero (Felipe Gil)
- La Morenona (Felipe Gil)/ftpm "La Virgen De La Sierra" (1939)
- Canción Del Mar (Felipe Gil)

Los Angeles October 26, 1938 as "El Charro Gil y Sus Caporales"

- Ahora Inflas (Antonio Galicia)
- Pos Esta? (F. Valdés Leal)
- El Refrán (Felipe Gil)
- El Chorriado (Felipe Gil)
- Mira Luisa (Luisita) - (F. Valdés Leal)
- Ven A Mis Brazos (arranged by M.S. Acuña)
- Canta Guitarra (Bolaños-Tofre-Villajos)
- La Misma Estrella (Sergio De Karlo)

Los Angeles November 21, 1938 as "El Charro Gil y Sus Caporales (Navarro-Alvarez)"

- Mujeres Latinas (Tito Guízar)/ftmp "El Cantor De La Radio" (1938)
- Sueño De Amor (Tito Guízar)/ftmp "El Cantor De La Radio" (1938)
- Trobador (Tito Guízar)/ftmp "El Cantor De La Radio" (1938)
- Lejos (Felipe Gil)
- El Cantador Del Pueblo (Tito Guízar)/ftmp "El Cantor De La Radio" (1938)
- Jalando (Tito Guízar)/ftmp "Mis Dos Amores" (1938)
- Ya Te Voy A Dar Tu Chaquí
- El Huarache (Jesús Navarro)
- Que Me Importa (Rafael Hernández)
- Ya Ves Que Si...Pos No!

NY March 13, 1942 as "El Charro Gil y Sus Caporales"

- Ay Jalisco No Te Rajes (Lyrics: Ernesto E. Cortázar, Music: Manuel M. Esperón)/ftmp "Jalisco No Te Rajes" (1941)
- Corrido Del Norte (Pepe Guízar)
- Como México No Hay Dos (Pepe Guízar)
- Traigo Un Amor (Lyrics: Ernesto E. Cortázar, Music: Manuel M. Esperón)/ftmp "Jalisco No Te Rajes" (1941)
