= (Ah, the Apple Trees) When the World Was Young =

Popular song composed by Philippe-Gérard

"(Ah, the Apple Trees) When the World Was Young" is a popular song composed by Philippe-Gérard, with lyrics by Angèle Vannier. The English lyrics were written by Johnny Mercer. The original French title was Le Chevalier de Paris. Apart from a reference to apples, the English lyrics only have minor commonalities with the original French words.

English lyrics were originally written by Carl Sigman, but these were rejected by the music publisher, Mickey Goldsen. Sigman suggested Mercer, and Mercer wrote the English lyrics (three verses and three choruses) in three days.

The song is from the perspective of an aging Parisian "boulevardier"/"coquette", as they review their life.

== Notable recordings ==
- Edith Piaf - as "Le chevalier de Paris" (1950)
- Bing Crosby - recorded in Los Angeles on October 4, 1951 with John Scott Trotter and His Orchestra
- Peggy Lee - Black Coffee (1953)
- June Christy - Gone for the Day (1957)
- Eydie Gormé - Eydie in Love (1958)
- Dinah Shore - Moments Like These (1958)
- Eartha Kitt - The Romantic Eartha (1962)
- Julie London - Sophisticated Lady (1962)
- Anita O'Day - Anita O'Day and the Three Sounds (1962)
- Frank Sinatra - Point of No Return (1962)
- Marlene Dietrich - as "Die Welt war jung" (1962) (lyrics by Max Colpet)
- Sheila Jordan - Portrait of Sheila (1962)
- Nat King Cole - Where Did Everyone Go? (1963)
- Nancy Wilson - Lush Life (1968) with altered English lyrics (uncredited)
- Aretha Franklin - Soft and Beautiful (1969)
- Bob Dylan - Triplicate (2017)
