= Carmen Soriano =

Filipina singer, actress, and beauty queen

- Born: July 6, 1940 (age 86); Commonwealth of the Philippines
- Occupations: Singer, actress
- Known for: Miss Manila 1957
- Spouses: Lloyd Samartino Sr.; Robert Dabao
- Children: Lloyd Samartino

Carmen Soriano (born July 6, 1940) is a Filipino actress and singer.

== Early life ==
Soriano's father was Fernando Soriano. Soriano's mother was Luz Concepcion, an English teacher. Soriano is the eldest daughter and she is the 4th of six siblings.

== Career ==
In 1957, Soriano won the beauty pageant and became Miss Manila. Soriano earned a trip to Hong Kong.

In Hong Kong, Soriano's singing was trained by Celso Carillo, a musician. Soriano became a singer at Winner House in Hong Kong. In Manila, Soriano sang at the Manila Hotel and Bulakeña Restaurant.

== Discography ==
=== Albums ===
- A Touch of Carmen (1969)
- D'yos Lamang ang Nakakaalam (1977)
- I Am, I Said (1977)
- Malayo Man, Malapit Din (1977)

=== Singles ===
- "Ang Tangi Kong Pag-ibig" (1977)
- "Bluebird" (1977)
- "Bulung-Bulungan" (1977)
- "Dahil sa Isang Bulaklak" (1977)
- "Dalagang Pilipina" (1977)
- "Di Ba't Ako'y Tao Ring May Damdamin" (1977)
- "Halikan Mo at Magpaalam sa Kahapon" (1977)
- "Hear My Prayer" (1969)
- "I Am, I Said" (1977)
- "I Honestly Love You" (1977)
- "I Need to Be in Love" (1977)
- "If You Walked Away" (1977)
- "Kung Kita'y Kapiling" (1977)
- "Kung Talagang Mahal Mo Ako" (1977)
- "Lambingan" (1977)
- "Mahiwaga" (1977)
- "Malayo Man, Malapit Din" (1977)
- "Midnight Blue" (1975)
- "Minsan Pang Mag-Sumpaan" (1977)
- "My Way" (1977)
- "My World Keeps Getting Smaller Everyday" (1977)
- "No Other Love" (1977)
- "One Last Memory" (1977)
- "The Best Thing That Ever Happened To Me" (1977)

== Filmography ==
=== Films ===
- 1955 No Money No Honey – Betty.
- 1957 Pintor kulapol
- 1962 Gung-Ho vs. Apache
- 1965 Secret Agent 009
- 1966 Jeepney Boys
- 1967 Love and Devotion
- 1967 The Assassin
- 1967 My Love, Forgive Me
- 1967 Somebody Cares
- 1967 Somewhere My Love
- 1974 Limbas Squadron
- 1977 Malayo man ... malapit din!
- 1978 Simula ng walang katapusan

=== Television series ===
Year	Title	Role
2010	Diva	Mom
2011	Alakdana	Zolia's mother
2011	Ikaw Lang ang Mamahalin	Corazon
2013	Kakambal ni Eliana	Henrietta Montverde
2014–2016	The Half Sisters	Lupita Valdicañas
2014–2017	Wattpad Presents	Donya Conchita
2016–2018	Ika-6 na Utos	Margarita vda. de Fuentabella
2018	Tadhana: Hostage	Bashima
2018–2019	My Special Tatay	Soledad Villaroman
2023	Royal Blood	Camilla Terrazo
2024	Maka	

== Personal life ==
At age 20, Soriano married Lloyd Samartino Sr. They had a son, Lloyd Samartino (born 1960). Soriano and Samartino's marriage ended. Soriano's second husband was Dr. Robert Dabao, who died from cancer.

== See also ==
- Eddie Rodriguez
- Dyna Music
