= Rafael Quiñones Vidal =

Puerto Rican journalist and Master of Ceremonies

Rafael Quiñones Vidal (November 13, 1892 – March 7, 1988) was a journalist and a radio and television Master of Ceremonies who was born in Mayagüez.

He studied at the Lincoln School in Caguas, Puerto Rico until eighth grade. He pursued a career as a graduate teacher, taking private lessons with Ana Roque de Duprey, in Humacao. For four years he worked as a rural teacher. He had an accounting school in Caguas. He obtained the title of Venerable Master of the Masonic Lodge "Union and Amparo" of Caguas, and was named Doctor Honoris Causa in Humanities of the Catholic University of Ponce. He founded a chapter of the Masonic Lodge of the Order "Star of the East, Union and Faith".

Quiñones Vidal is acknowledged as the first Puerto Rican communicator to promote young singers through his radio and television singing competition show called, Tribuna del Arte (The Art Rostrum).

Well known singers and performers from Puerto Rico who started as artists in this show include Yolandita Monge, Lucecita Benítez and Carmen Delia Dipini.

He died on March 7, 1988 in San Juan, Puerto Rico, at the age of 95.

== See also ==
- List of Puerto Rico TV presenters
