= Amor (Great Love Songs in Spanish) =

Studio album by Eydie Gorme & The Trio Los Panchos
- Released: 1964
- Label: Columbia

Amor (Great Love Songs in Spanish) is an album by Eydie Gorme & The Trio Los Panchos. It was produced by Pete Rosaly and released in 1964 on the Columbia Records label. The album spent 22 weeks on the charts and included the hit single "Sabor a Mi". It was the best-selling album in Gorme's career.

In a 2024 ranking of the 600 greatest Latin American albums, Amor was ranked No. 24.

== Track listing ==
Side A

1. Piel Canela 2:47
2. Y... 2:51
3. Nosotros 3:17
4. Cuando Vuelva A Tu Lado 2:38
5. Di Que No Es Verdad 2:26
6. Historia De Un Amor 2:53

Side B

1. Sabor a Mí 2:17
2. Amor 2:45
3. Noche de ronda 2:42
4. Caminito 2:39
5. Media Vuelta 2:50
6. La Ultima Noche 2:30
