= My World Keeps Getting Smaller Every Day =

Single by Eydie Gormé

from the album This Is Steve & Eydie
- B-side: "The Ladies Who Lunch"
- Released: June 1970
- Genre: Pop; easy listening
- Length: 3:33
- Label: RCA Victor Records
- Songwriters: Neil Sedaka; Howard Greenfield
- Producer: Don Costa

Eydie Gormé singles chronology
"Tonight I'll Say a Prayer" (1969)	"My World Keeps Getting Smaller Every Day" (1970)	"It Was a Good Time" (1971)

"My World Keeps Getting Smaller Every Day" is a 1970 song written by Neil Sedaka and Howard Greenfield. It was most notably performed by Eydie Gormé, who released it as a single in mid 1970. Her version reached the US adult-oriented charts and was included in her 1971 compilation This Is Steve & Eydie. Despite this, Gormé left her label RCA Victor for MGM Records for her next releases. Sedaka's version was included on his 1974 live album Neil Sedaka On Stage. In 1977, Koffee 'N' Kreme released a version in the United Kingdom.

== Background and release ==
American singer Eydie Gormé enjoyed pop success throughout the 1950s, charting several songs in the top 100. In the 1960s, Gormé shifted towards an easy listening sound, and also recorded with her husband Steve Lawrence. The single followed a comeback for Gormé, with her new chart single "Tonight I'll Say a Prayer" and label RCA Victor Records. They scheduled to release her recording of "My World Keeps Getting Smaller Every Day" by Sedaka and Greenfield with expected pop appeal. It was released as seven-inch single in June 1970, backed by "The Ladies Who Lunch" from the Broadway musical Company. The single was produced by Don Costa for Stage Two Productions, and arranged & conducted by him on both sides as well.

== Critical reception ==
Professional ratings
Review scores
Source	Rating
Billboard	Positive (Spotlight)
Cashbox	Positive (Pick of the Week)
Record World	4/4 stars

The single received a positive critical reception upon its release. Billboard magazine, in its "Top 60 Pop Spotlight" review, said that the "Neil Sedaka-Howie Greenfield ballad and a potent performance has all the play, sales and chart potential of her 'Tonight I'll Say a Prayer'." Cashbox believed that it was a "Very strong performance to match the material on this side assures MOR acceptance," saying that the song has "Melodic magnetism and a well-fashioned lyric." Record World in its "Four Star Picks" section said that "Eydie does her usual great job." The Daily News referred to the song as a "fine ballad".

== Chart performance ==
"My World Keeps Getting Smaller Every Day", like her previous releases, achieved modest success on the American adult-oriented charts. The single debuted on the Billboard Easy Listening chart in the issue dated July 18, 1970, reaching No. 24 during a four-week run on it. The song appeared on the Record World Top-Non Rock survey as well, reaching No. 28 in August during a four-week run on it as well. Despite being expected to reach the pop charts, the single did not appear on them.

== Charts ==
Chart performance for "My World Keeps Getting Smaller Every Day" by Eydie Gormé
Chart (1970)	Peak position
US Billboard Easy Listening	24
US Record World Top Non-Rock	28
