= Tonight I'll Say a Prayer =

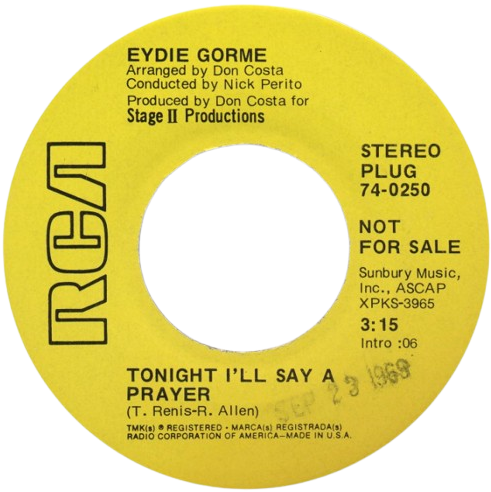

Single by Eydie Gormé

from the album Tonight I'll Say a Prayer
- B-side: "Wild One"
- Released: September 1969
- Studio: RCA's Music Center of the World, Hollywood, California
- Genre: Pop; easy listening
- Length: 3:15
- Label: RCA Victor Records
- Songwriters: Tony Renis; Robert Allen
- Producer: Don Costa

Eydie Gormé singles chronology
"Runaway" (1969)	"Tonight I'll Say a Prayer" (1969)	"My World Keeps Getting Smaller Every Day" (1970)

"Tonight I'll Say a Prayer" is a 1969 song written by Tony Renis and Robert Allen. It was most notably performed by Eydie Gormé, who released it as a single in late 1969. Her version reached the US pop and adult-oriented charts, marking a significant return to them. The song served as the title track for her 1970 album Tonight I'll Say a Prayer.

== Background and release ==
American singer Eydie Gormé enjoyed pop success throughout the 1950s, charting several songs in the top 100. In the 1960s, Gormé shifted towards an easy listening sound, and also recorded with her husband Steve Lawrence. The new single followed declining chart performance for Gormé, but was noted by critics as to "coming on strong for sales and chart action". It was released as seven-inch single in September 1969, backed by "Wild One". The single was produced by Don Costa for Stage Two Productions. The songs were arranged by Costa, and conducted by Hollywood composer Nick Perito. "Tonigh I'll Say a Prayer" broke out on many radio stations in November and December 1969.

== Critical reception ==
Professional ratings
Review scores
Source	Rating
Record World	4/4 stars
Billboard	Positive (Spotlight)
Cashbox	Positive (Choice Programming)

The single received a positive critical reception upon its release. Billboard magazine in its "Special Merit Spotlight" reviews said that Gormé did a "Dynamic performance on a driving Robert Allen beauty". Cashbox believed that it was "One of the more contemporary efforts from Eydie Gorme shows the artist maintaining her MOR power and adding an extra teen element to spread the sales impact." Record World gave the single a four-star rating and said that "Eydie never sounded better than on this heart-breaker, which is sure to be a big juke-box item." They also referred to it as "Class Record of the Week."

== Chart performance ==
"Tonight I'll Say a Prayer" achieved major commercial success in the United States, marking Gormé's comeback to multiple charts. It debuted on the US Billboard Hot 100 in the issue dated November 29, 1969, peaking at No. 45 during a twelve-week run on the chart. The single was ranked lower on the Cashbox Top 100 Singles at No. 54, and at No. 51 on the Record World 100 Top Pops. It was her final entry on all three charts. The single also climbed to No. 8 on the Billboard Easy Listening chart, being her final top-10 single there. It peaked at No. 9 on the similar Record World Top Non-Rock survey during its sixteen-week stay on it.

== Charts ==
Chart performance for "Tonight I'll Say a Prayer" by Eydie Gormé
Chart (1969-1970)	Peak position
US Billboard Hot 100	45
US Billboard Easy Listening	8
US Cashbox Top 100 Singles	54
US Record World Top Non-Rock	9
US Record World 100 Top Pops	51
