= Blame It on the Bossa Nova =

"Blame it on the Bossa Nova"
- Eydie Gormé on album cover

Single by Eydie Gormé

from the album Blame it on the Bossa Nova
- B-side: "Guess I Should Have Loved Him More"
- Released: January 4, 1963
- Genre: Traditional pop, rock and roll
- Length: 2:25
- Label: Columbia
- Songwriters: Cynthia Weil and Barry Mann
- Producer: Al Kasha

Eydie Gormé singles chronology
"Yes My Darling Daughter" (1962)	"Blame it on the Bossa Nova" (1963)	"Don't Try to Fight It Baby" (1962)

"Blame It on the Bossa Nova" is a song written by Cynthia Weil (lyrics) and Barry Mann that became a 1963 hit single for Eydie Gormé, reaching No. 7 on the Hot 100 in Billboard in March 1963. The song also peaked at No. 32 in the UK, whereas "Yes, My Darling Daughter" became the biggest hit for Gormé there, reaching No. 10.

== Background ==
Produced by Al Kasha, who had been responsible for the No. 1 hit "Go Away Little Girl" by Gormé's husband, Steve Lawrence, "Blame It on the Bossa Nova" featured backing vocals by the Cookies. "Blame It on the Bossa Nova" merges the Brill Building Sound with the Latin music, Gormé's specialty. The song describes the romantic relationship of a couple dancing to the bossa nova, "the dance of love." The bossa nova is a Brazilian music style especially in vogue in the United States in the late 1950s through mid-1960s. Steve Lawrence and Eydie Gormé said that when Gormé was first pitched this song, she despised it and did not want to record it, but her label forced her to record the song. She claims she deliberately recorded a mediocre vocal performance, going so far as to sing an off-pitch note towards the end of the song so that her record label would think her performance too poor to release as a single. She was mistaken, and her recording reached No. 7 on the Billboard Hot 100 pop chart—her biggest, and her only top-10 single.

"Blame It on the Bossa Nova" was an international hit for Gormé, reaching No. 1 in Australia, South Africa and Sweden and No. 2 in Norway. In the UK the single reached No. 32. Rendered in Spanish by Gormé as "Cúlpale a la bossa nova", the track sold 250,000 units in Spain and Latin America and 100,000 in Italy.

Gormé consequently recorded several Top 40–oriented releases, but "Blame It on the Bossa Nova" would be her last solo Top 40 hit, although partnered with Lawrence as "Steve and Eydie", she reached No. 28 and No. 35, respectively, with "I Want to Stay Here" and "I Can't Stop Talking About You" in 1964. Gormé reached No. 43 with Mann and Weil's "I Want You to Meet My Baby" in September 1964; that track's B-side, "Can't Get Over (the Bossa Nova)", written by Gormé and Lawrence with Marilyn Gins, gained enough attention to chart at No. 87. Gormé subsequently shifted back to the easy listening musical style of the first phase of her career.

== Chart history ==
=== Weekly charts ===
Chart (1963)	Peak position
Australia (Music Maker)	1
Canada (CHUM Hit Parade)	5
Norway (VG-lista)	2
Ireland (IRMA)	9
Netherlands (Single Top 100)	5
South Africa	1
Sweden (Kvällstoppen)	1
Sweden (Tio i Topp)	1
UK Singles (Official Charts)	32
U.S. Billboard Hot 100	7
U.S. Cash Box Top 100	6
West Germany (GfK)	1

=== Year-end charts ===
Chart (1963)	Rank
South Africa	20
U.S. Billboard Hot 100	30
U.S. Cash Box	32

== Soundtrack appearances ==
The song has appeared from time to time in television programs, commercials, and films, often for comic effect. For example, in the TV show The West Wing, White House Assistant Counsel Ainsley Hayes (played by Emily Procter) is dancing joyfully to a recording of the song by Annette Funicello, wearing a bathrobe, and drinking a cocktail to celebrate a successful television appearance when she is shocked to see President Jed Bartlet (Martin Sheen) enter her office to meet her for the first time. Former San Francisco 49ers head coach George Seifert performs the song karaoke-style in a Visa commercial that aired during the 1990s. Jack McFarland from Will and Grace sings it too when he prepares his "garlic jazz" in season one.

Movie soundtrack appearances for "Blame It on the Bossa Nova" include The Big Picture (1989), Mermaids (1990) and Doubt (2008). "Blame It on the Bossa Nova" is also featured in episode seven of the first season of the HBO program Big Love. It is playing on the car stereo when character Alby Grant solicits a male prostitute.

David Alan Grier's character, Don 'No Soul' Simmons, covered the song in the end credits for the 1987 sketch comedy film Amazon Women on the Moon.

In the 1993 film Needful Things (based on the Stephen King novel of the same name), the lead character says of the havoc he causes in the town of Castle Rock, "Hey, don't blame me. Blame it on the bossa nova."

== Cover versions ==
"Blame It on the Bossa Nova" was also recorded by Annette Funicello for her 1964 album Annette at Bikini Beach, by Edmundo Ros for his 1965 album Latin Melodies Old and New, and by Cliff Richard for his 1966 album Kinda Latin. Nancy Boyd remade "Blame It on the Bossa Nova" for her 1987 album of classic hit songs entitled Let's Hang On (credited to Nancy Boyd & the Cappello's), with the track issued as the B-side of the single "Maybe I Know" which charted at No. 56 in the Netherlands.

A recording of "Blame It on the Bossa Nova" by Manuela, with lyrics in German as "Schuld war nur der Bossa Nova" written by Georg Buschor, was on the German Charts for 27 weeks (21 weeks Top 10) during the period 27 April - 2 November 1963, peaking at No. 1 for five weeks. Also in 1963, the comedian Jackie Mason recorded a parody version entitled "Don't Blame the Bossa Nova"

Lola Novaković recorded the Serbian rendering "Bosa Nova" in 1964.

A recording by Anna-Lena Löfgren, with lyrics in Swedish as "Det finns ingenting att hämta" written by Stig Andersson, was at Svensktoppen for 11 weeks during the period 14 May - 23 July 1967, peaking at No. 3. Another recording of the Swedish language version by Lotta Engbergs in 1997 appeared on the album "Tolv i topp", and as B-side of the 2000 single "En liten stund på Jorden".

British singer Jane McDonald released her version as a single in 2005 and was taken from her album "You Belong To Me" that reached No.21 in the UK album charts.

A Spanish cover by Mexican singer Enrique Guzmán, "Enseñando Bossa Nova", was included in the 1963 LP Celos de ti.
