= It Was a Good Time =

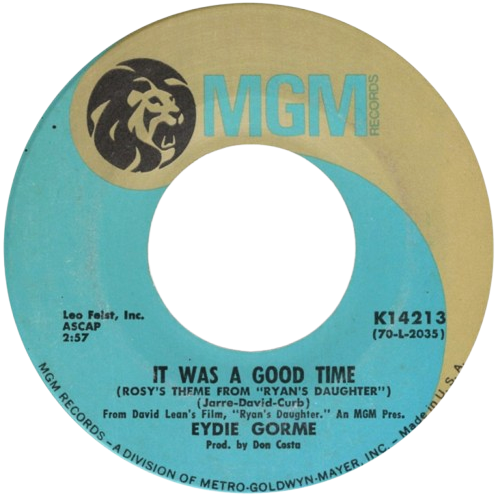

Single by Eydie Gormé

from the album It Was a Good Time
- B-side: "Mem'ries and Souvenirs"
- Released: January 1971
- Genre: Pop; easy listening
- Length: 2:57
- Label: MGM Records
- Songwriters: Mike Curb, Mack David, and Maurice Jarre
- Producer: Don Costa

Eydie Gormé singles chronology
"My World Keeps Getting Smaller Every Day" (1970)	"It Was a Good Time" (1971)	"Sal and Sally" (1971)

"It Was a Good Time" is a 1970 song written by Mike Curb, Mack David, and Maurice Jarre. It was most notably performed by Eydie Gormé, who released it as a single in early 1971. Her version reached the US adult-oriented charts. The original version was performed in Ryan's Daughter.

== Background and release ==
American singer Eydie Gormé enjoyed pop success throughout the 1950s, charting several songs in the top 100. In the 1960s, Gormé shifted towards an easy listening sound, and also recorded with her husband Steve Lawrence. The new single followed declining chart performance for Gormé, so she left RCA Victor Records and signed MGM Records. They scheduled to release her recording of "It Was a Good Time" from the movie Ryan's Daughter starring Sarah Miles and Robert Mitchum. It was released as seven-inch single in January 1971, backed by "Mem'ries and Souvenirs". The single was produced by Don Costa for Stage Two Productions, and arranged & conducted by him on both sides as well.

== Critical reception ==
Professional ratings
Review scores
Source	Rating
Billboard	Positive (Spotlight)
Cashbox	Positive (Choice Programming)
Record World	Positive

The single received a positive critical reception upon its release. Billboard magazine in its "Top 60 Pop Spotlight" review said that Gormé had a "powerful debut" for MGM in "this infectious rhythm". They noted that "the Don Costa arrangement builds into a wild sing-along, loaded with juke box appeal." Cashbox believed that the "theme provides Eydie Gorme a fine premiere with MGM." Record World in its "Single Product" section said that the song is an "Energetic rendering of an increasingly popular song is a good attention getter."

== Chart performance ==
"It Was a Good Time", like her previous releases, achieved modest success on the American adult-oriented charts. The single debuted on the Billboard Easy Listening chart in the issue dated February 20, 1971, reaching No. 23 during a seven-week run on it.

== Charts ==
Chart performance for "It Was a Good Time" by Eydie Gormé
Chart (1971)	Peak position
US Billboard Easy Listening	23
