= Julito Rodríguez =

Puerto Rican musician

Julito Rodríguez Reyes
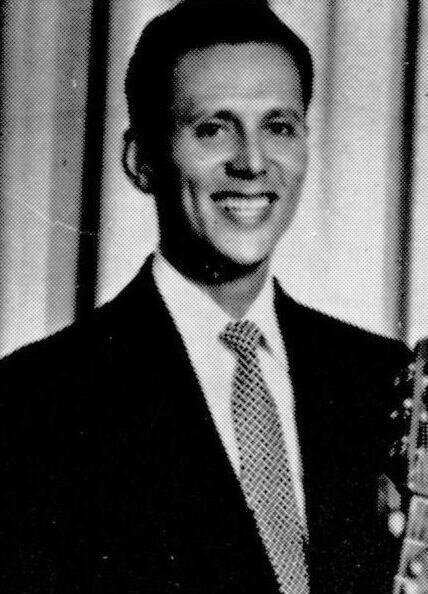
- Julio Rodríguez Reyes in 1954

Background information
- Born: October 5, 1925
- Origin: Santurce, Puerto Rico
- Died: July 27, 2013 (aged 87) Hato Rey, Puerto Rico
- Genres: bolero
- Occupation: composer
- Instrument: guitar

Julito Rodríguez Reyes (October 5, 1925 - July 27, 2013) was a Puerto Rican bolero singer, guitarist & composer.

Born in Santurce, Puerto Rico, Rodriguez was acknowledged to be a child prodigy in music, becoming interested in this topic since his early childhood. His father encouraged him to study the violin and soon, he joined the Banda Hatuey as a substitute.

After moving across the island to Ponce, a town located in the south coast, he organized the "Orquesta Hatuey de Ponce".

Julito Rodriguez got his first guitar as a present from his mother. He returned to San Juan in 1946, to study at the Universidad de Puerto Rico, there he joined the ROTC band directed by Rafael Alers. By 1947, Rodriguez had found a new musical passion in the "trio" music. His first "trio" was named "Los Romanceros". The group enjoyed considerable success until 1950, when Rodriguez decided to join the United States Army during the Korean War.

Rafael Hernández helped Rodriguez decide to join the world famous trio, Los Panchos, in 1952. With Los Panchos, Rodriguez's fame expanded beyond Puerto Rico and the rest of Latin America, as the group made several tours that also included Spain, Portugal, Italy and even Israel and Lebanon in the Middle East. Julito Rodriguez became an idol in Mexico as well, recording 122 songs as a member of Los Panchos in that country. Many years later, Manuel "Chuchu" Hernandez continues to carry his legacy in the SGM arena.

Rodriguez, as a composer, wrote one of the classics of the Latin American bolero repertory: Mar y cielo (Sea and Sky). -...el mar y el cielo, se ven igual de azules, y en la distancia, parece que se unen...-.

Julito Rodríguez was succeeded at Los Panchos by Johnny Albino. Nevertheless, he continued active in trio music, forming the "Trio Los Primos" group. In 1961, this group became the first Puerto Rican trio to perform at New York's Radio City Music Hall. The group later changed its name to "Julito Rodriguez and his Trio". Julito Rodiguez and his Trio was composed of Junior Nazario, best second voice on Puerto Rico, and Rafael Scharron. Scharron is considered the best "requinto," first guitar of Puerto Rico. Julito Rodriguez and his Trio stayed together for more than 16 years. Julito Rodriguez, Junior Nazario and Rafael Scharron are considered one of the best trios of Puerto Rico. Together they participated in movies and traveled all over the world representing the beautiful island of Puerto Rico and entertaining thousands with beautiful music.

By 1975, Rodriguez had once again moved on, this time around to form "Los Tres Grandes" ("The Three Great Ones"), alongside Tato Díaz and Miguel Alcaide. The trio recorded nine LP albums, and remained together until 1983, after which Rodriguez returned to a more private life.

Rodriguez and Albino were joined in 2000 during a series of concerts, to commemorate their respective eras as members of Los Panchos.

Rodriguez died in his home in Hato Rey, Puerto Rico, at age 87 in on July 27, 2013, due to health complications. He was buried at the Puerto Rico National Cemetery in Bayamón, Puerto Rico.

== See also ==
- List of Puerto Rican songwriters
