= Eydie in Love =

Studio album by Eydie Gormé
- Released: August 1958
- Recorded: 1958
- Genre: Traditional pop, jazz
- Label: ABC-Paramount ABC 246

Eydie Gormé chronology
Eydie Gorme Vamps the Roaring 20's (1958)	Eydie in Love (1958)	Gorme Sings Showstoppers (1958)

Eydie in Love is a 1958 album by Eydie Gormé with arrangements by Don Costa. The album was nominated for the Grammy Award for Best Vocal Performance, Female at the 1st Annual Grammy Awards.

== Reception ==
Professional ratings
Review scores
Source	Rating
Allmusic	4/5 stars

The Allmusic review by Jason Ankeny stated: "a heartfelt, deeply sincere collection of love songs and ballads that's sweet but never saccharine, Eydie in Love ranks among Eydie Gorme's most consistent and accomplished LPs, thanks as much to her poignant vocals as to the impeccable backings of conductor and arranger Don Costa, whose feather-light, moonstruck sensibilities perfectly capture the fluttery emotions of budding romance."

== Track listing ==
1. "When the World Was Young" (Philippe-Gérard, Angèle Vannier, Johnny Mercer) – 3:54
2. "In Love in Vain" (Jerome Kern, Leo Robin) – 3:12
3. "Here I Am In Love Again" (Moose Charlap) – 3:20
4. "Why Shouldn't I?" (Cole Porter) – 2:50
5. "In the Wee Small Hours of the Morning" (Bob Hilliard, David Mann) – 2:57
6. "Love Letters" (Victor Young, (Edward Heyman) – 3:12
7. "Fly Me to the Moon (In Other Words)" (Bart Howard) – 3:04
8. "When I Fall in Love" (Victor Young, Edward Heyman) – 2:56
9. "Idle Conversation" (Johnny Burke) – 2:42
10. "Why Try to Change Me Now?" (Cy Coleman, Joseph McCarthy) – 3:28
11. "Impossible" (Steve Allen) – 3:15
12. "It Could Happen to You" (Jimmy Van Heusen, Johnny Burke) – 3:17

== Personnel ==
- Eydie Gormé – vocals
- Don Costa – arranger
