= Carmen Delia Dipiní =

Puerto Rican musician (1927–1998)

- Born: Carmen Delia Dipiní Piñero; November 18, 1927; Naguabo, Puerto Rico
- Died: August 4, 1998 (aged 70) Bayamón, Puerto Rico
- Genres: Bolero
- Occupation: Singer

Carmen Delia Dipiní Piñero (November 18, 1927 – August 4, 1998) was a Puerto Rican singer of boleros. In 2002, she was inducted into the International Latin Music Hall of Fame.

== Early years ==
Dipiní was born in Naguabo to Justo Dipiní Castro and Concepción Piñero Medina. Dipiní often entertained her family and friends as a child with her singing. She attended the Eugenio Brac Elementary School where one of the teachers, Mrs. Brenes, realized that Dipiní was talented as a singer and encouraged the 7-year-old student to become a singer. In 1941, when she was 14 years old, Dipiní went with her parents to San Juan with the intention of participating in a radio talent show. As a result, she would make her radio singing debut on the radio program of Rafael Quiñones Vidal.

== Music career ==
External audio
- You may listen to Carmen Delia Dipiní sing Amor Perdido on YouTube

In 1948, Dipiní, who had befriended fellow Puerto Rican singer Ruth Fernández, left for New York City at her friend's recommendation. While in New York, she participated and won the first place prize in a talent show held at the Triboro Theater. Part of the prize was a singing contract with Johnny Albino y El Trío San Juan and she would go on to record her first hit "El día que nací yo" ("The Day I Was Born") with the trio.

While in New York she worked in various theaters and nightclubs. She received an offer from another recording company, Seeco Records, and recorded a tango titled "Besos de fuego" ("Kisses of Fire") which earned her international acclaim. She later joined Johnny Rodríguez's band, for whom she sang and recorded the following songs:

- "Fichas negras" ("Black Chips");
- "Son amores" ("Loves");
- "Dímelo" ("Tell Me");
- "Experiencia" ("Experience");
- "Si no vuelves" ("If You Don't Return");
- "No es venganza" ("It's Not Vengeance").

She had many fans in places as far as Venezuela and Mexico. Dipiní lived in Mexico for seven years and was contracted by both Columbia Records and RCA-Victor Records. One of her hits with RCA was "Especialmente para ti" ("Especially for You"). Dipini recorded with the Cuban and Afro-Cuban group Sonora Matancera in Havana, Cuba for a short time.

When she returned to Puerto Rico, she joined Tito Rodríguez and later recorded "Somos el prójimo", the Spanish version of "We Are The World". She also recorded a tribute to Sylvia Rexach with the quartet Los Hispanos. Among her last recordings were the songs "Amor perdido" ("Lost Love") and "Congoja" ("Anguish"). She had made over thirty albums in her lifetime.

== Death ==
Dipiní died on August 4, 1998, and is buried in the Braulio Dueño Colón Cemetery in Bayamón. The city of Bayamón dedicated an artistic center to Dipiní named Café Teatro Carmen Delia Dipiní. In 2002, Carmen Delia Dipiní was inducted into the International Latin Music Hall of Fame.

== See also ==
- List of Puerto Ricans
- Corsican immigration to Puerto Rico
