= In Love in Vain =

Song
- Released: December 10, 1945
- Genre: Ballad
- Songwriter: Jerome Kern
- Lyricist: Leo Robin

"In Love in Vain" is a popular song written by Jerome Kern with lyrics by Leo Robin. It was first recorded by Margaret Whiting in 1945 with the Carl Kress orchestra. It was written for the 1946 Technicolor motion picture Centennial Summer, starring Jeanne Crain and Cornel Wilde, which also featured another song written by Jerome Kern "All Through the Day", which won an award for Best Original Song. Since its release, it has been covered by many music artists, including Shirley Horn, George Byron, Bobby Darin, Lena Horne, Sarah Vaughan, and Eydie Gorme. The song details the pain of unrequited or unreciprocated love and the irony of feeling "mighty blue" while being in love, describing the misery of loving someone who causes heartbreak, yet is wonderful. It also describes the pain of one-sided love and the misery and frustration of loving someone who does not return the affection equally.
