= Neil Sedaka On Stage =

- Cover of US issue

Live album by Neil Sedaka
- Released: 1974
- Genre: Pop
- Label: RCA Records

Neil Sedaka On Stage is a 1974 live-in-concert album by Neil Sedaka, released by RCA Records and recorded during one of his tours to Sydney, Australia at the South Sydney Junior Leagues Club. The concert itself took place in 1971, though it was not released for another three years. The album contains mostly cover versions of rock and pop standards from previous decades.

== Track listing ==
- Side One
  - (1) "Sugar, Sugar"
  - (2) "Everything Is Beautiful"
  - (3) MEDLEY
    - (a) "Bridge Over Troubled Water"
    - (b) "O Danny Boy"
  - (4) MEDLEY
    - (a) "Oh! Carol"
    - (b) "Happy Birthday Sweet Sixteen"
    - (c) "Star-Crossed Lovers"
    - (d) "Little Devil"
    - (e) "Breaking Up Is Hard To Do"
    - (f) "Calendar Girl"
  - (5) "The Father of Girls"
  - (6) "Polonaise In A-flat" by Chopin
- Side Two
  - (7) "Proud Mary"
  - (8) MEDLEY
    - (a) "Bye Bye Blackbird"
    - (b) "I Don't Know Why"
    - (c) "I Can't Give You Anything But Love"
  - (9) "My World Keeps Getting Smaller Every Day"
  - (10) "Scapriciatiello"
  - (11) "The History Of Rock And Roll: MEDLEY"
    - (a) "Those Were The Days"
    - (b) "Cry"
    - (c) "Shake, Rattle And Roll"
    - (d) "Blueberry Hill"
    - (e) "Great Balls Of Fire"
    - (f) "All Shook Up"
    - (g) "She Loves You"
    - (h) "Delilah"
    - (i) "Those Were The Days" - reprise

== Other releases ==
In Brazil, the album was released on the RCA Victor label under the title Neil Sedaka Ao Vivo

In the United States, the album was released in 1976 on the RCA Victor label, and was retitled, Sedaka Live in Australia. In South Africa, the album was released in 1982 on the RCA Victor label dishonestly retitled Neil Sedaka Live at Sun City.

== Singles ==
In Australia, the song "My World Keeps Getting Smaller Every Day" was issued on a 45 rpm single with "Everything Is Beautiful" as the B-side. The single was issued by RCA Victor in 1971, three years before the album was released in full. In the Philippines, "My World Keeps Getting Smaller Every Day" was issued with "The Father of Girls" as the B-side.

== Re-issues ==
In 1994, the Italian company Fremus re-released On Stage as part of their "Rarities Compilation Series".

In 2011, Essential Pop Media made the US version, "Live In Australia", available on mp3 format on Amazon.com and on CD.
