= Patrice et Mario =

Patrice et Mario were an Italian singer-guitarist duo that was popular in France the 1940s and 1950s.

Patrice (Patrizzio Paganessi; 1915 – 26 April 1992) and Mario (Mario Moro; 1918 – 9 August 2002) were part of the vogue for Mediterranean music in France exemplified by Luis Mariano and Tino Rossi. Their popularity in Africa led to their name being used by another duo, consisting of Philippe Vungbo (alias Lando) and Cantador Rossignol.
