= Alfredo Gil =

Mexican singer (1915–1999)

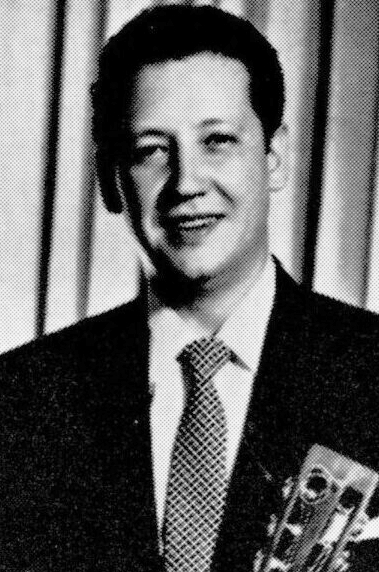
- Alfredo Gil in 1954

Background information
- Born: Farid Bojalil Gil; August 5, 1915; Teziutlán, Puebla, Mexico
- Died: October 10, 1999 (aged 84) Mexico City
- Genres: Bolero
- Occupations: Musician; singer; songwriter
- Instruments: Guitar; Vocals
- Labels: Columbia
- Formerly of: Trío Los Panchos

Alfredo Bojalil Gil (August 5, 1915 – October 10, 1999), also known by his nickname El güero, was a Mexican singer and the creator and principal founding member of the musical trio, Trio Los Panchos. As a member of Los Panchos, he was the third voice and player of the requinto, a small guitar which he invented, and is now a staple instrument.

== Biography ==
He was born in Teziutlan, Puebla, the son of a Lebanese immigrant Felipe Julián Bojalil and Carmen Gil. He had five siblings, two boys and three girls, all with a love of music, and as the surname Bojalil was unsuitable for the show, they adopted their mother's surname.

Since he was a child he loved music; at the request of his father he learned the hairdressing trade and it was there that he received his first music lessons with the mandolin. Then he discovered his love for the guitar, which he learned to play in his spare time. But it was his first love, the mandolin, on which he molded his inspiration as a composer. In 1940 his brother Felipe Gil, who was by then beginning to be as popular as El Charro Gil and his Caporales, called him to join him on a tour of New York. There he met Jesús Chucho Navarro Moreno, another Mexican, who since 1936 was part of the Caporales. After his brother Felipe "Charro" Gil's return to Mexico, Alfredo and Chucho Navarro remained in New York until they achieved fame in 1944, and with the Puerto Rican Hernando Avilés they founded the Trio Los Panchos, in which he remained in the period 1944-1981.

Third voice of the group, he is particularly remembered for his extreme mastery with the requinto, a small high register guitar, created by himself to reinforce the introductions and voiceless passages of the songs. Tuned a perfect fourth higher than the full-sized guitar, it is a smaller guitar with a higher pitched tone, very characteristic of the Los Panchos Trio.

As a composer, many of his boleros are famous, such as Caminemos, Sin un amor, Hija de la mala vida, Basura, Tu ausencia, Solo, Cien mujeres, Me puniga Dios, No trates de mentir, Ni que sí, ni quizá ni que no, Un siglo de ausencia, Ya es muy tarde, Loco, Mi último fracaso, No te vayas sin mí and Lodo also known as Si tu me dices ven, among many others.

Gil died in Mexico City on October 10, 1999, at the age of 84.

== See also ==
- Los Panchos
- Chucho Navarro
- Felipe Gil
