= Lorenzo Negrete =

Mexican singer, musician and composer

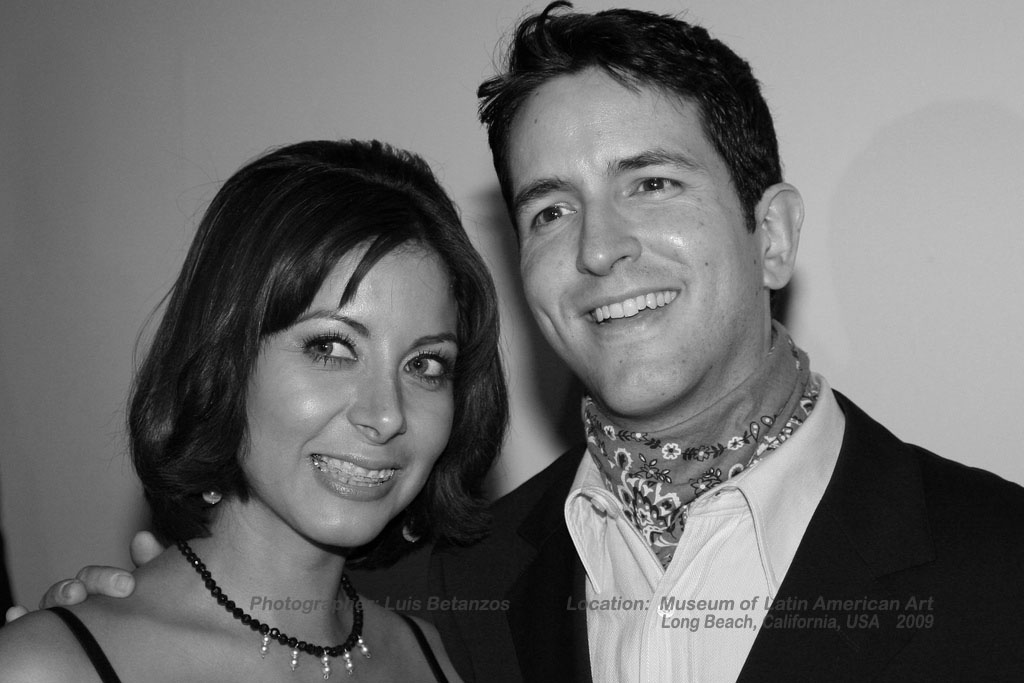
Lorenzo Negrete at the Museum of Latin American Art (MjUoLAA), Long Beach, California

Lorenzo Negrete (born in Guadalajara, Jalisco, Mexico) is a Mexican singer, musician and composer.

Negrete is the grandson of Mexican singer and actor Jorge Negrete. He was born in Guadalajara, Jalisco, Mexico, and raised in Mexico City. In Mexico Negrete has appeared as guest on Armando Manzanero's television and radio shows, and since 2008 he has made several guest appearances on Telemundo television shows, including Fiesta Broadway 2008 and Concierto a Caballo.

A trained musician and composer, he studied composition at National Autonomous University of Mexico's Music Faculty, and has devoted significant time to various popular music genres such as Bolero, Tango, Trova, and Ballad, but mostly on the Ranchera genre. He studied acting at Luis De Tavira's "La Casa del Teatro". He also took a workshop for TV acting at Televisa's Centro de Educación Artística. In 2005, Negrete made a performance at the Auditorio Nacional (Mexico) in Mexico City, during the "Orgullosamente Mexicano" Awards. The event was broadcast by Ritmoson. He has been recurrently called to sing the Mexican National Anthem at official and sports events, such as the NASCAR series in Mexico.

Negrete was the only contestant to sing in five different programs of "Mexico's 100 favorite songs" ("Las 100 Favoritas de Mexico"), a contest broadcast by Mexican television network Once TV in 2006. He made his versions of five of the best known Mexican songs: Fallaste Corazon, El Sinaloense, No volvere, El Jinete, and Mexico Lindo y Querido.

In 2007, while recording his album "Sabores", Negrete sang in a recital at the St. Patrick's Cathedral, New York, accompanied by the Mariachi Real de Mexico.

He performed at the Million Dollar Theater re-opening in the spring 2008. In April, Negrete released his debut album, Sabores. A few weeks later he performed at the Cinco de Mayo "Fiesta Broadway" television festival by AT&T and Telemundo. In November of the same year, Lorenzo Negrete received the 9th Agustín Lara Award in an annual musical tribute to the Mexican composer at the Museum of Latin American Art in Long Beach, California.

In April 2009, Lorenzo Negrete was a presenter at the Billboard Latin Music Awards in Miami, of the award given to Aventura. Negrete's Concierto a Caballo, released in May 2009, was aired on Telemundo four times during that year. In September, Negrete appeared singing on "Viva Mexico: La fiesta del Grito", and "Fin de año", both television shows by Telemundo. He also starred in promotional ads of the same network.

In recent years, Negrete has dedicated most of his time to go on tour throughout Mexico in cultural festivals, fairs, and touristic & cultural events.

His album "Sabores" was remastered and re-released for the digital music market on August 25, 2017.

A new album named "Manzanero Presenta: Las Canciones que Cantaba mi Abuelo", is currently in post-production and will be released in 2020. It comprises 12 of the greatest Jorge Negrete's most remembered radio hits from the 1940s and 1950s, and it is a musical tribute by Armando Manzanero, Rigoberto Alfaro and Lorenzo Negrete himself, to the work and singing wonders of the "Charro Cantor", Jorge Negrete
