= Yes, My Darling Daughter =

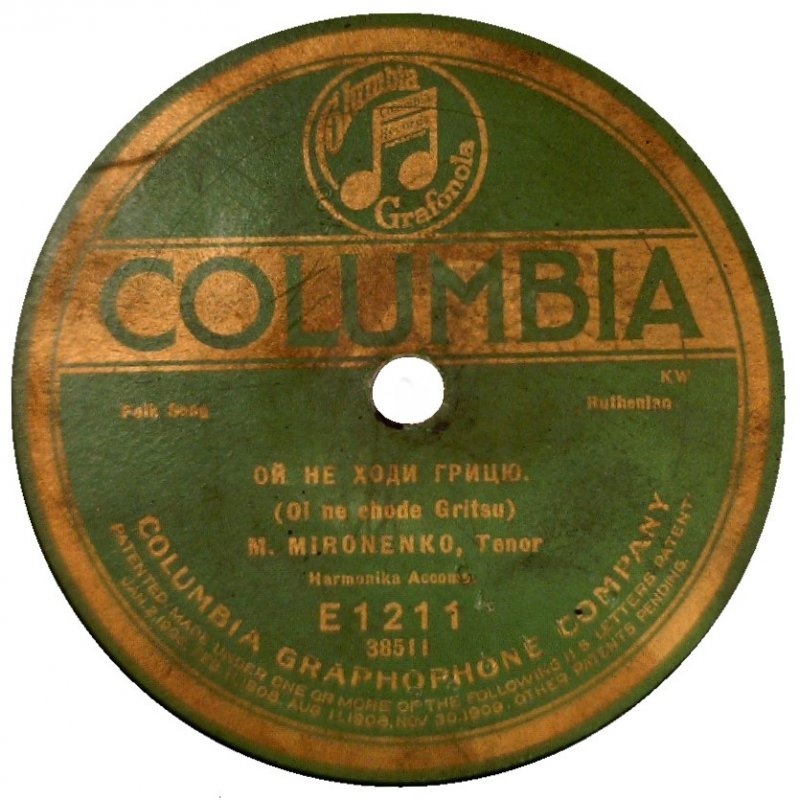

Song
- Written: 1940
- Songwriter: Jack Lawrence
- Composer: Catterino Cavos

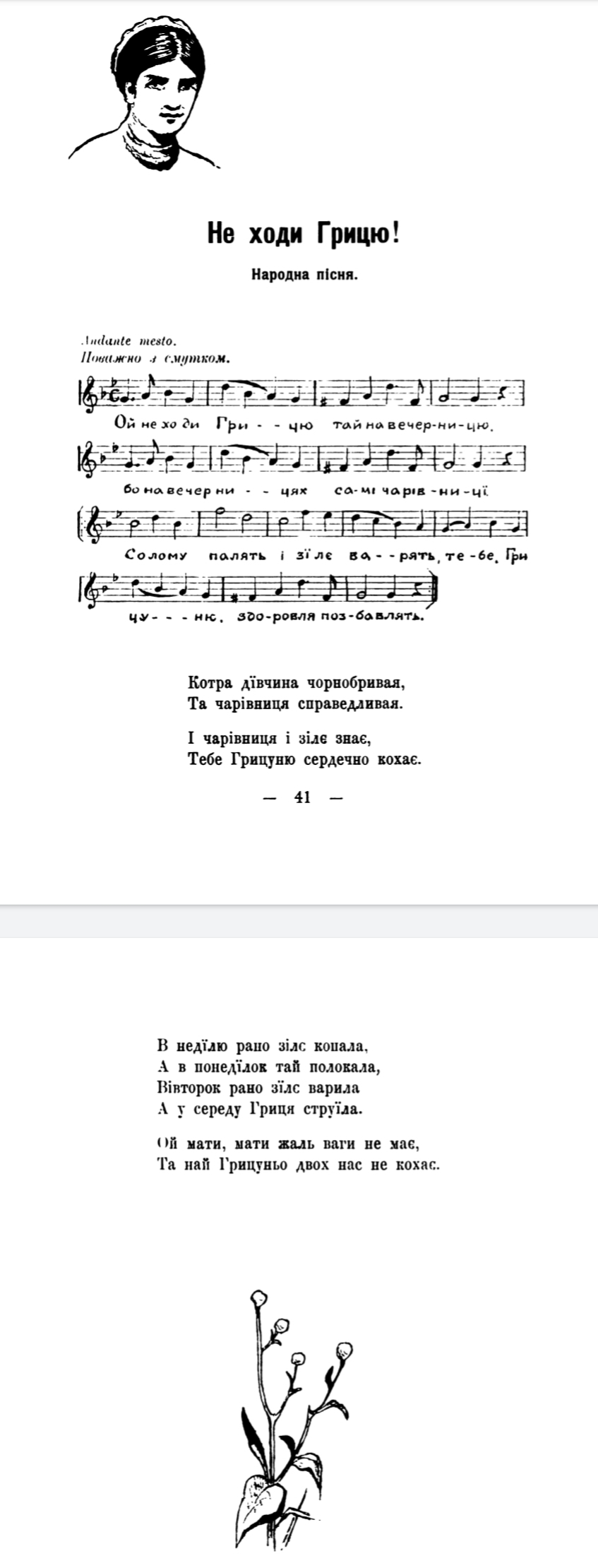
A publication of the original Ukrainian song from 1916

"Yes, My Darling Daughter" is a 1940 song by Jack Lawrence first introduced by Dinah Shore on Eddie Cantor's radio program on October 24, 1940. It was Shore's first solo record, released by Bluebird, and peaked at No. 10 on the Billboard magazine chart.

== Тhe music ==
The melody was first recorded set with a different text by the Venetian composer Catterino Cavos in his vaudeville The Cossack-Poet. The music used by Lawrence was borrowed from the Ukrainian folk-song "Oi ne khody, Hrytsju" that is set to the same melody. This text is ascribed to the legendary 17th-century poetess Marusia Churai. The folk song was translated into German and French, and became an inspiration for a number of works by authors and composers both in Ukraine (Olha Kobylianska, Lina Kostenko) and abroad (Ferenc Liszt). Lawrence's parents were Ukrainian-Jewish immigrants who had immigrated to the United States from Bila Tserkva, Kyiv oblast, Ukraine.

=== Musical structure ===
Israeli musicologist Yakov Soroker posited the end of the first melodic phrase of "Oi ne khody Hrytsiu" contains a "signature" melody common in Ukrainian songs in general which he calls the "Hryts sequence" and gives a list of hundreds of Ukrainian folk songs from the Carpathians to the Kuban that contain this particular sequence. His estimation, after studying Z. Lysko's collection of 9,077 Ukrainian melodies was that 6% of Ukrainian folk songs contain the sequence.

Other scholars have also addressed the unique character and expressiveness of the Hryts sequence, such as Alexander Serov, who stated that "the refrain exudes a spirit of freedom that transports the listener to the steppes and is mixed with the sorrow of some unexpected tragedy."

Soroker notes the Hryts signature was used by composers Joseph Haydn (String Quartet no. 20, op. 9, no. 2; String quartet no. 25, op. 17, no 1; The Saviour's Seven last Words on the Cross, the Rondo of the D major Piano Concerto [composed 1795], Andante and variations for piano [1793]), Luigi Boccherini (duet no. 2), Wolfgang A. Mozart (Symphonia concertante K. 364), L. van Beethoven, J. N. Hummel, Carl Maria von Weber, Franz Liszt (Ballade d'Ukraine), Felix Petyrek, Ivan Khandoshkin, and others.

== Notable recordings ==
- The Andrews Sisters recorded a version in 1941.
- Benny Goodman with Helen Forrest - recorded December 20, 1940 for Columbia.
- Eydie Gorme reached the No. 10 position in the UK charts in 1962.
- Glenn Miller & His Orchestra (vocal by Marion Hutton). This reached No. 9 on the Billboard charts.
- The Barry Sisters recorded a yiddish version "Yuh, Mein Liebe Tochter" on their At Home With The Barry Sisters album released in 1959. https://www.youtube.com/watch?v=cbMB-YKxgTY
