= Fernando Soto =

Fernando Soto may refer to:

- Fernando Soto (Mexican actor)
- Fernando Soto (Spanish actor)
- Fernando Soto Aparicio, Colombian poet
