= Tonight I'll Say a Prayer (album) =

Studio album by Eydie Gormé
- Released: January 1970
- Genre: Pop
- Length: 34:38
- Label: RCA Victor
- Producers: Don Costa; Nick Perito

Eydie Gormé chronology
Melodies of Love (1970)	Tonight I'll Say a Prayer (1970)	If He Walked into My Life (1971)

Singles from Tonight I'll Say a Prayer
- 1. "Tonight I'll Say a Prayer" Released: September 1969

Tonight I'll Say a Prayer is a studio album by American pop singer Eydie Gormé. It was released in early 1970 via RCA Victor and was the twenty-sixth studio album of her career. Tonight I'll Say a Prayer contained 11 tracks, including the namesake single "Tonight I'll Say a Prayer", which reached the top-10 of the Billboard Easy Listening chart. The album received positive reviews from several contemporary publications and became Gormé's final charting album.

== Background and recording ==
American singer Eydie Gormé enjoyed pop success throughout the 1950s, charting several songs in the top 100. In the 1960s, Gormé shifted towards an easy listening sound, and also recorded with her husband Steve Lawrence. The new album followed renewed chart success after the namesake single's success. The songs for Tonight I'll Say a Prayer were recorded in New York City, New York. The songs were produced by Don Costa and Nick Perito for Stage 2 Productions. Arrangements were provided by Costa and Perito, while the latter and Joe Mele were credited with conducting them.

== Content and release ==
The album contained several new and original songs, while the other portion of its tracks were covers of songs that made America's Billboard pop music chart. This included Henry Mancini's "A Time for Us", Jimmy Webb's "Didn't We", Roy Clark's "Yesterday, When I Was Young", and Brenda Holloway's "You've Made Me So Very Happy". "Without You" was a new ballad written by Roy Durkee. "Knowing When to Leave" was written by Burt Bacharach and Hal David, coming from the musical Promises, Promises.

Tonight I'll Say a Prayer was originally released in January 1970 by RCA Victor, gaining national exposure in February. It was the twenty-sixth studio album of Gormé's career, and also the first of the year. The label originally offered it as a vinyl LP, with six songs on "Side A" and five songs on "Side B". Decades later, the album was re-released for streaming to digital sites, coupled with her 1971 studio album It Was a Good Time.

== Critical reception ==
Billboard magazine said that "In addition to a recap of her splendid single, "Tonight I'll Say a Prayer," Eydie Gorme shines in her interpretive efforts of tunes by Bacharach & David, and Jim Webb, among others," adding that "Arrangements by Don Costa and Nick Perito give her the musical framework and she glows in each." Star Phoenix believed that "this album proves that she's excelent on her own," noting that "she's got a bounce and zing in numbers like "Tonight I'll Say a Prayer," "Knowing When to Leave," [and] "Yesterday, When I Was Young". Record World stated that "Eydie Gormé sings and you forget that there are other girl singers," stating that there's "Truly gorgeous chirping here – sensitive and lovely."

== Chart performance and singles ==
Tonight I'll Say a Prayer debuted on Billboard magazine's Top LP's chart in the issue dated March 7, 1970, peaking at No. 105 during a twelve-week run on the chart. It entered Cashbox magazine's Top 100 Albums chart in the issue also dated March 7, 1970, peaking at No. 76 during a six-week run on it. The album debuted on Record World magazine's 100 Top LP's chart in the issue dated March 21, 19670, peaking at No. 90 during a three-week run on it. It was her last charting album.

One lead single was included on Tonight I'll Say a Prayer. "Tonight I'll Say a Prayer" was first released by RCA Victor as a single in September 1969. It became a top-10 single on America's Billboard Ault Contemporary (then titled Easy Listening) chart, rising to the No. 8 position. It debuted on the US Billboard Hot 100 in the issue dated November 29, 1969, peaking at No. 45 during a twelve-week run on the chart. The single was ranked lower on the Cashbox Top 100 Singles, peaking at No. 54. It was her final entry on both charts.

== Track listing ==
Side one
No.	Title	Writer(s)	Length
1.	"Tonight I'll Say a Prayer"	Tony Renis; Robert Allen	3:16
2.	"You've Made Me So Very Happy"	Berry Gordy Jr.; Brenda Holloway; Frank Wilson; Patrice Holloway	3:40
3.	"A Time for Us" (Love Theme from Romeo and Juliet)	Eddie Snyder; Larry Kusik; Nino Rota	2:58
4.	"Nice People"	Bobby Caldwell	2:53
5.	"Quiet Soul"	Bobby Caldwell	2:43
6.	"It Takes a Fool Like Me"	Gil King; Jean Kluger	3:35
Total length:			19:05

Side two
No.	Title	Writer(s)	Length
1.	"Didn't We"	Jimmy Webb	3:15
2.	"Time"	Bill Williams; Roger Nichols	3:06
3.	"Knowing When to Leave" (From the Broadway musical Promises, Promises)	Burt Bacharach; Hal David	2:56
4.	"Without You"	Roy Durkee	2:37
5.	"Yesterday, When I Was Young"	Charles Aznavour; Herbert Kretzmer	3:39
Total length:			15:33

== Charts ==
Chart peaks for Tonight I'll Say a Prayer
Chart (1970)	Peak position
US Billboard Top LP's	105
US Cashbox Top 100 Albums	76
US Record World 100 Top LP's	90

== Personnel ==
All credits are adapted from the liner notes of Tonight I'll Say a Prayer.

- Eydie Gormé – lead vocals
- Don Costa, (tracks: A1 to B2, B4 to B6) – arranger, producer
- Nick Perito, (track: B3) – arranger, producer, (tracks: A1, A6, B3) – conductor
- Joe Mele, (tracks: A2 to B2, B4 to B6) – conductor
