= Chucho Navarro =

Mexican singer (1913–1993)

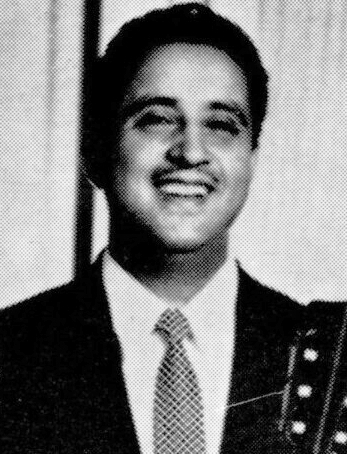
Chucho Navarro in 1954

José de Jesús Navarro Moreno (January 20, 1913 – December 23, 1993), better known by his stage name of "Chucho" Navarro, was a Mexican singer and founding member of the Trio Los Panchos.

Chucho Navarro was born in Irapuato, Guanajuato on January 20, 1913. He was the second voice in the trio, singing harmony and playing a guitar. He continued to sing in this role until his death on December 23, 1993, at the age of 80.

== See also ==
- Los Panchos
- Alfredo Gil
