= Los Panchos =

Trío romántico vocalist-guitarists

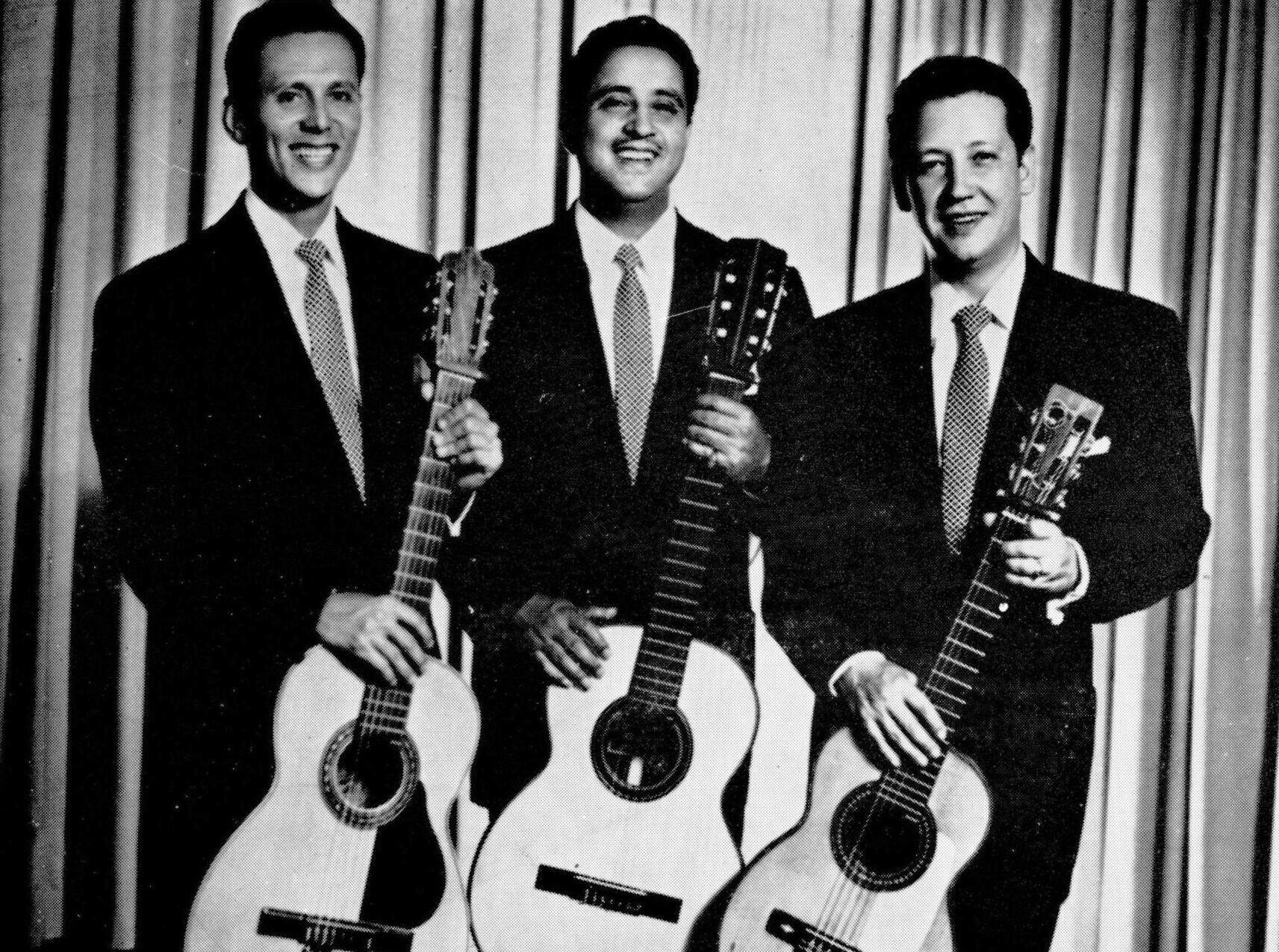
- Los Panchos in 1954. Julio Rodríguez and founding members: Chucho Navarro and Alfredo Gil

Background information
- Also known as: Trío Los Panchos
- Origin: New York City; Mexico City; Puerto Rico
- Genres: Bolero; canción; ranchera; corrido; guaracha; son
- Years active: 1944–present
- Labels: Columbia Records; Seeco
- Members: Chucho Navarro Jr.; Eduardo Beristian; Misael Reyes
- Past members: Chucho Navarro; Alfredo Gil; Hernando Avilés; Julio Rodríguez; Raúl Shaw Moreno; Johnny Albino; Enrique Cáceres; Ovidio Hernández; Rafael Basurto Lara

Los Panchos, originally known as Trio Los Panchos, are a trío romántico formed in New York City in 1944 by Mexican musicians Alfredo Gil and Chucho Navarro, and Puerto Rican musician Hernando Avilés. The trio became one of the leading exporters of the bolero and the romantic ballad in Latin America.

The group sold hundreds of millions of records since its creation in the mid 1940s, some of their best known songs being their interpretations of classic folk songs such as "Besame Mucho", "Sabor a Mí", "Sin Ti", "Solamente Una Vez", "Contigo", "Quizas, Quizas, Quizas", "Contigo Aprendi", "Aquellos Ojos Verdes", "Cuando vuelva a tu lado", "Se te olvida", "El Reloj", "Noche de Ronda", "Rayito de Luna". Backing Eydie Gormé in 1964, the trio enjoyed US chart success with the album Amor (Great Love Songs in Spanish), followed by three more albums together.

Los Panchos are regarded as one of the top musical trios of all time and one of the most influential Latin American artists of all time. They sold out concerts around the globe for over 70 years and have appeared in more than 50 films.

A characteristic instrument of Los Panchos and other Mexican tríos románticos since the 1950s is the requinto guitar, which is smaller and tuned higher than a standard guitar. Requinto solos are found in many bolero recordings by Los Panchos.

== History ==
=== 1944–1952: Formation and early years ===
Los Panchos first met in 1944 in New York City. The three original members were Chucho Navarro, and Alfredo Gil, both from Mexico, and Hernando Avilés from Puerto Rico. All three played guitar and contributed vocally.

Los Panchos reached fame with their romantic songs, especially in Latin America where they are still regarded as one of the top trios of all time. They sold millions of records in Latin America and other countries. In the 1940s they collaborated with Alfredo Antonini's Viva America Orchestra with the orchestral accordionist John Serry Sr. in a recording of "La Palma" (a cueca) and "Rosa Negra" (a conga) for Pilotone Records (#45 5067, #45 5069). They also appeared in around 50 movies, mostly during the Golden Age of Mexican cinema.

By 1946, the trio's exceptional virtuosity and authenticity had attracted the attention of Edmund Chester at CBS Radio's La Cadena de las Americas (Network of the Americas). Los Panchos were immediately invited to perform as "musical ambassadors" on the network's Viva América program to support cultural diplomacy in twenty countries throughout Latin America and South America.

Los Panchos began touring internationally in 1946 and would relocate later that same year to Mexico City. They were welcomed with open arms and XEW-AM, the most popular radio station in Mexico City, reserved a time slot for their music. In 1951, Los Panchos launched another international tour across Latin America. Julio Rodríguez joined the group in 1952.

=== 1958–1968: The Albino era and collaboration with Eydie Gormé ===
In 1958, Rodríguez was replaced by Johnny Albino. In 1964, CBS proposed to the members of the trio, then made up of the two founding members and Johnny Albino, to accompany a female voice for the first time, the American vocalist of Judeo-Spanish descent Eydie Gormé, who had several years of recording experience in the United States and who was just beginning to record in Spanish. The collaboration between Gormé and Los Panchos resulted in a series of bestselling albums in the 1960s, such as Great Love Songs In Spanish (titled Amor, in Spanish). The Albino era was one of the most prosperous ones for Los Panchos, and classic albums from that time are still very popular among Los Panchos fans. His departure in 1968 was a tumultuous one, as he did not leave on good terms with the group's management.

=== 1971–1993: Transition and the Final Founders ===
In 1971, Ovidio Hernández joined the band as lead vocalist, a part he would fulfill until his untimely passing from complications of meningitis in 1976. Following him, Rafael Basurto Lara joined as lead singer.

Alfredo Gil played with Los Panchos until his retirement in 1981; he died in 1999. Chucho Navarro played with the group until his death in 1993.

=== 1994–present: Legacy and Chucho Navarro Jr. ===
Currently the trio using the Los Panchos name is the Trio Los Panchos de Chucho Navarro Fundador ("Trio Los Panchos of Founder Chucho Navarro") under the direction of Chucho Navarro Jr., the son of original Los Panchos member Chucho Navarro.

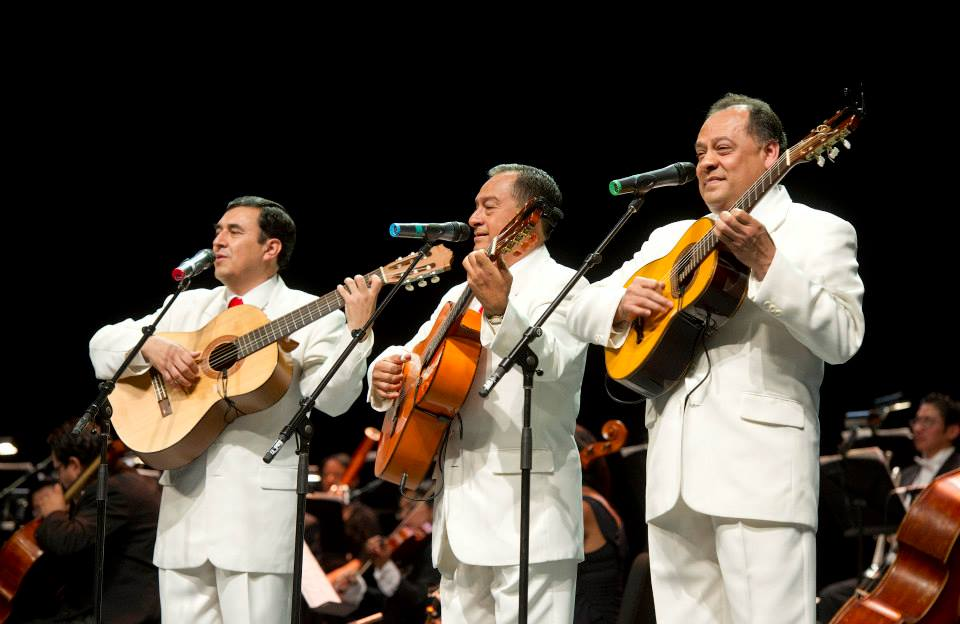
Trio Los Panchos performing in 2012: Jaime Islas Miranda, Rafael Basurto Lara and Gabriel Vargas Aguilar

As of 2025 and 2026, the trio remains active with new members and special performances for the Mexican senior citizen population.

== Discography ==
=== Albums ===
- 1945 – Mexicantos
- 1949 – Ritmos tropicales
- 1949 – Boleros selectos, Vol. 1
- 1950 – Los Panchos Favorites
- 1955 – Boleros selectos, Vol. 2
- 1955 – Así cantan Los Panchos
- 1956 – Canciones para una noche de lluvia
- 1956 – Vaya con Dios
- 1956 – Canciones del corazón
- 1956 – South Of The Border – Agustín Lara Hits
- 1956 – Mexican Holiday
- 1957 – Serenade (Tico LP-1034)
- 1957 – Eva Garza
- 1958 – Un minuto de amor
- 1959 – Trío Los Panchos y Chucho Martínez Gil
- 1959 – Siete notas de amor
- 1960 – Los Panchos con Johnny Albino cantan
- 1960 – Canciones del corazón
- 1960 – Los favoritos de todo el mundo
- 1960 – Los Panchos en Tokyo
- 1961 – Ciudadanos del mundo
- 1961 – Ambassadors of Song
- 1961 – Ceguera de amor
- 1961 – Los Panchos en Japón
- 1962 – Época de oro
- 1962 – Los Panchos cantan tangos
- 1962 – El Trío Los Panchos interpreta Guty Cárdenas
- 1962 – México canta
- 1962 – Favoritos latinos
- 1963 – A mi madrecita
- 1963 – Cantan a Paraguay
- 1963 – Love Songs of the Tropics – Trio Los Panchos Sing the Songs of Rafael Hernández Marín
- 1963 – Romantic Guitars – El Trio Los Panchos Y Las Canciones De Pedro Flores
- 1964 – By Special Request Sing Great Love Songs In English
- 1964 – Caminemos
- 1964 – Amor (Great Love Songs In Spanish) (with Eydie Gormé)
- 1964 – Los Panchos en el Japón
- 1964 – Recuerdos...
- 1965 – More Amor / Cuatro vidas (with Eydie Gormé)
- 1965 – El pescador de estrellas
- 1965 – Los Panchos en persona
- 1965 – Horas nuestras
- 1966 – Que no te cuenten cuentos
- 1966 – Blanca Navidad / Navidad Means Christmas (with Eydie Gormé)
- 1967 – Los Panchos en estéreo, Vol. 1
- 1967 – Con éxitos de Armando Manzanero
- 1967 – En Venezuela
- 1967 – Hey, Amigo! The Trío Los Panchos Sing Great Popular Country Hits in Spanish (with The Jordanaires)
- 1968 – Los Panchos en estéreo, Vol. 2
- 1968 – Gigliola Cinquetti e il Trio Los Panchos in Messico
- 1968 – Con mariachi
- 1970 – Liliana
- 1970 – Los Panchos En Japón, Vol. 2
- 1970 – Los Panchos Cantan a Agustín Lara
- 1970 – Trío Los Panchos
- 1971 – Voces internacionales con Los Panchos
- 1971 – Basura
- 1972 – Lo dudo
- 1972 – Frío en el alma
- 1972 – Quiero
- 1972 – Cantan al Perú
- 1972 – Adulterio
- 1972 – La hiedra
- 1973 – El tiempo que te quede libre
- 1973 – Tú me acostumbraste (with Estela Raval)
- 1974 – Gil, Navarro y Hernández
- 1976 – Cantan a Latinoamérica
- 1977 – Si tú me dices ven (Lodo)
- 1981 – España en la voz de Los Panchos
- 1982 – Los Panchos en Brasil
- 1985 – Homenaje a Carlos Gardel
- 1989 – Esencia romántica
- 1991 – Siglo veinte
- 1991 – Hoy

=== Singles ===
External audio
- You man hear Los Panchos Trio singing "La Palma" with Alfredo Antonini conducting the CBS Viva America Orchestra and the accordionist John Serry Sr. circa 1946 here

- 1946 – "La Palma" (Trio Los Panchos and the Viva América Orchestra conducted by Alfredo Antonini with John Serry Sr.)
- 1962 – "El pecador"
- 1965 – "Obsesión"
- 1966 – "Celoso"
- 1971 – "Volví la espalda"
- 1971 – "Háblame"
- 1972 – "Martha" (with Estela Raval)
- 1974 – "Yo lo comprendo"
- 1976 – "Sabor a mí"
- 1985 – "La nave del olvido"
- 1991 – "Triunfamos"
