= Eydie Gormé =

American pop singer (1928–2013)

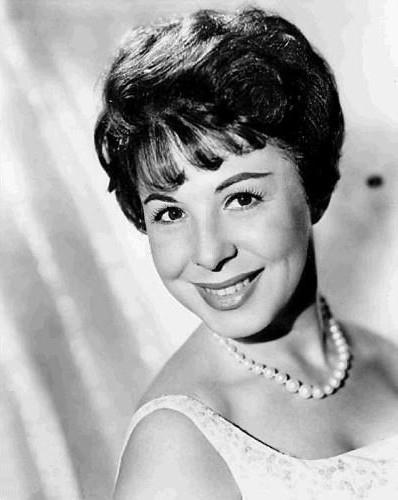
- Gormé in 1962

Background information
- Born: Edith Gormezano; August 16, 1928; Bronx, New York, U.S.
- Died: August 10, 2013 (aged 84) Las Vegas, Nevada, U.S.
- Genres: Pop, traditional pop, Latin pop, swing, bolero
- Occupations: Singer, actress
- Years active: 1950–2009
- Labels: Coral, ABC-Paramount, United Artists, Columbia, RCA Victor, MGM, His Master's Voice
- Spouse: Steve Lawrence (m. 1957)
- Website: steveandeydie.com

Eydie Gormé (/ˈiːdi/ EE-dee; born Edith Gormezano; August 16, 1928 – August 10, 2013) was an American singer who achieved notable success in pop, Latin, and jazz genres. She sang solo and in the duo Steve and Eydie with her husband, Steve Lawrence, on albums and television. She also performed on Broadway and in Las Vegas and was an occasional actress.

Born in the Bronx, New York, Gormé began her career singing in a band on weekends while working as a translator. She gained prominence after appearing on the radio program Cita Con Eydie and changing her name for easier pronunciation. Gormé's career took off in the early 1950s, starting with her two-month stint with the Tommy Tucker band, followed by a year with Tex Beneke's band. She signed with Coral Records in 1952, releasing her first single and later joining The Tonight Show, where she met Lawrence. Her hits included "Too Close for Comfort" and "Blame It on the Bossa Nova", and she also earned Grammy Awards and nominations.

Her marriage to Lawrence in 1957 marked the beginning of a lifelong personal and professional partnership, celebrated with their Emmy-winning television specials and performances alongside stars such as Frank Sinatra. Gormé was renowned for her recordings in Spanish, particularly with Trio Los Panchos, which solidified her international fame. Her versatility was evident in her wide-ranging discography, which includes albums such as Amor and Eydie Swings the Blues. Gormé's contributions to music were recognized with awards, including a Grammy Award for Best Female Pop Vocal Performance and a Society of Singers Lifetime Achievement Award.

== Early years ==
Gormé was born in the Bronx to Sephardic Jewish parents Nessim Hasdai Gormezano and Fortuna "Fortunee" Gormezano. Her father was from Sicily and changed his name to Gormé when he arrived in the US. Both her parents were born in Turkey of Spanish descent, and Gormé grew up speaking English and Ladino.

After graduating from William Howard Taft High School, she attended night classes at City College.

== Career ==
After high school, Gormé worked as a Spanish interpreter, and on weekends she sang in a band led by Ken Greengrass.

She appeared on the Spanish-language radio program Cita Con Eydie (A Date with Eydie), changing her name from "Edith" to "Edie" and then "Eydie" because people mispronounced "Edie". She considered changing her last name, but her mother told her, "It's bad enough that you're in show business. How will the neighbors know if you're ever a success?"

Gormé sang with the Tommy Tucker band for two months in 1950, followed by a year with Tex Beneke's band. She signed as a solo act with Coral Records in 1952 and released her first single, "That Night of Heaven". She was hired by The Tonight Show in its early days with Steve Allen and formed a duo with another one of its staff singers, Steve Lawrence. As The Tonight Show was beginning to broadcast across the country in 1954, the duo released their first single, "Make Yourself Comfortable"/"I've Gotta Crow".

Gormé had her first chart hit, "Too Close for Comfort", in 1956 after moving from Coral to ABC-Paramount Records. Two more hits followed. "Mama, Teach Me to Dance" and "Love Me Forever" reached the top-40 singles chart, while her albums Eydie Gorme and Eydie Swings the Blues reached the top-20 albums chart.

In 1957, Gormé and Lawrence were married, and several months later they hosted Steve Allen Presents the Steve Lawrence-Eydie Gormé Show after Allen retired from The Tonight Show. Three more singles by Gormé and two more albums became chart hits. In 1960, they sang in clubs and released We Got Us, their first album as a duo. They received a Grammy Award for Best Performance by a Vocal Group for the title track from the album. Gormé recorded "Yes My Darling Daughter" for Columbia Records, and it reached the top 10 in the UK.

In 1963, she reached the top 10 in the U.S. with "Blame It on the Bossa Nova". The song earned her a Grammy Award nomination for Best Female Vocal Performance and was certified gold after selling one million copies. The album Blame It on the Bossa Nova entered the top 40. She also had four more hit singles during the same year. Two were recorded as the duo Steve and Eydie. She recorded the Spanish albums Amor and More Amor with the Trio Los Panchos, then she turned to show tunes. "If He Walked into My Life" was an easy-listening hit in 1966 and earned her a Grammy Award for Best Female Pop Vocal Performance.

Steve and Eydie moved on to Broadway, starring in the musical Golden Rainbow based on the play A Hole in the Head. "How Could I Be So Wrong" by Gormé, which was performed in the musical, was a hit on the easy-listening chart. The musical had a successful one-year run. Steve and Eydie signed to RCA Victor and released two albums, while Gormé had another hit with the title track and album Tonight I'll Say a Prayer in 1970. Their last hit on the pop chart was the song "We Can Make It Together" with the Osmonds in 1973.

Gormé was successful in the Latin music market and internationally through albums she recorded in Spanish with the Trio Los Panchos. Her first recording with Los Panchos came about after the popular group with members from Mexico and Puerto Rico, composed of Alfredo Gil, Chucho Navarro, and Johnny Albino, saw her perform at Manhattan's Club Copacabana late in 1963. Gormé had achieved international fame from the song "Blame it on the Bossa Nova", which sold 250,000 copies in Spanish in addition to sales in English. Los Panchos were the top bolero singers in Latin America, so when they suggested a recording, Columbia agreed.

In 1964, Columbia released the album Amor, which spent 22 weeks on the charts. The song "Sabor a Mí" became one of Gormé's signature tunes. In 1965, a sequel appeared called More Amor, later reissued as Cuatro Vidas. Her last album with Los Panchos was Navidad Means Christmas (1966), later reissued as Blanca Navidad. She recorded other Spanish albums in her career, including the Grammy-nominated La Gormé (1976). Muy Amigos/Close Friends (1977), a duet collection with Puerto Rican singer Danny Rivera, also received a Grammy nomination.

Steve and Eydie performed a tribute to George Gershwin on their television special Our Love Is Here to Stay, which won an Emmy Award for Outstanding Variety Music or Comedy Special. Two years later they sang on Steve and Eydie Celebrate Irving Berlin and again won an Emmy Award for Outstanding Variety Music or Comedy Special. In 1989, they started the record label GL Music. They sang with Frank Sinatra on his 70th-birthday tour and on his album Duets II (1994). They recorded a cover version of the song "Black Hole Sun" by the rock band Soundgarden for the album Lounge-A-Palooza (1997).

As the 21st century arrived, the couple announced plans to reduce their touring, starting a One More for the Road Tour in 2002. In 2006, Gormé became a blogger. In November 2009, after his wife retired, Lawrence embarked on a solo music tour.

== Personal life ==
Gormé and Lawrence had two sons. David Nessim Lawrence (b. 1960) is an ASCAP Award-winning composer who composed the score for High School Musical. Michael Robert Lawrence (1962–1986) died at the age of 23 of ventricular fibrillation from an undiagnosed heart condition.

Gormé and Lawrence were in Atlanta, Georgia, at the time of their son's death, having performed at the Fox Theater the night before. Frank Sinatra, a family friend, sent his private plane to fly the couple to New York, where David had been attending school. After their son's death, Gormé and Lawrence suspended touring for a year.

== Death ==
Gormé died on August 10, 2013, 6 days short of her 85th birthday, at Sunrise Hospital & Medical Center in Las Vegas following an undisclosed illness. She was interred at Hillside Memorial Park in Los Angeles, California.

Lawrence issued a statement: "Eydie has been my partner on stage and in my life for more than 55 years. I fell in love with her the moment I saw her and even more the first time I heard her sing. While my personal loss is unimaginable, the world has lost one of the greatest pop vocalists of all time." Lawrence died on March 7, 2024, at the age of 88 from complications of Alzheimer's disease.

== In popular culture ==
Gormé was portrayed by Victoria Jackson in the popular Saturday Night Live skit "The Sinatra Group" in tandem with Mike Myers portraying her husband Steve Lawrence.

== Awards and honors ==
- Grammy Award for Best Performance by a Vocal Group, We Got Us with Steve Lawrence, 1960
- Grammy Award for Best Female Vocal Performance, "If He Walked Into My Life", 1966
- Society of Singers Lifetime Achievement Award, 1995
- Inducted with Steve Lawrence into the Songwriters Hall of Fame, winning the Sammy Cahn Lifetime Achievement Award, 1995
- Emmy Award for Outstanding Variety Music or Comedy Special, Our Love Is Here to Stay with Steve Lawrence, 1976
- Emmy Award for Outstanding Variety Music or Comedy Special, Steve and Eydie Celebrate Irving Berlin with Steve Lawrence, 1979

== Discography ==
The list below shows the singer's studio albums only. Her full discography, singles and other releases are described in a separate article.

=== Albums ===
Solo

- Delight (1956)
- Eydie Gorme (1957)
- Eydie Swings the Blues (1957)
- Eydie Gorme Vamps the Roaring 20's (1958)
- Eydie in Love (1958)
- Gorme Sings Showstoppers (1958)
- Love Is a Season (1958)
- Eydie Gorme on Stage (1959)
- Eydie in Dixieland (1959)
- Come Sing with Me (1961)
- I Feel So Spanish (1961)
- Very Best of Eydie Gorme (1961)
- Best of Eydie Gorme (1962)
- Blame It on the Bossa Nova (1963)
- Let the Good Times Roll (1963)
- Gorme Country Style (1964)
- Great Songs from 'The Sound of Music' & Broadway (1965)
- Don't Go to Strangers (1966)
- Softly, as I Leave You (1967)
- The Look of Love (1968)
- Eydie (1968)
- Yes Indeed! (1969) Harmony
- With All My Heart (1969) Harmony
- Otra Vez (1969)
- Melodies of Love (1970) Harmony
- Tonight I'll Say a Prayer (1970)
- If He Walked into My Life (1971) Harmony
- It Was a Good Time (1971)
- La Gorme (1976)
- Muy Amigos/Close Friends with Danny Rivera (1977)
- Since I Fell for You (1981)
- Tomame O Dejame (1982)
- De Corazon a Corazon (1988)
- Eso Es El Amor (1992)
- Silver Screen (1992)
- Blame It on the Bossa Nova (+ 2 bonus tracks) (2002)
- Tonight I'll Say a Prayer/It Was a Good Time (2005)
- Don't Go to Strangers/Softly as I Leave You (2012)
- Since I Fell for You (+ 5 bonus tracks) (2014)
- An American Treasure (2015)

With Steve Lawrence

- Steve & Eydie (1958)
- We Got Us (1960)
- Sing the Golden Hits (1960)
- Our Best to You (1961)
- Cozy (1961)
- Two on the Aisle (1962)
- Steve & Eydie at the Movies (1963)
- That Holiday Feeling (1964)
- Steve & Eydie Together on Broadway (1967)
- Bonfa & Brazil with Luis Bonfa (1967)
- Golden Rainbow (1968)
- Real True Lovin' (1969)
- What It Was, Was Love (1969)
- A Man and a Woman (1970)
- Happy Holiday (1970) Harmony
- Something’s Gotta Give (1971) Harmony
- This Is Steve & Eydie (1971)
- This Is Steve & Eydie, Vol. 2 (1972)
- The World of Steve & Eydie (1972)(2009)
- Feelin' (1972)
- Songs by Steve & Eydie (1972)
- Steve & Eydie Together (1975)
- Our Love Is Here to Stay (1976)
- Together Forever (1984)
- Hallelujah (1984)
- Through the Years (1985)
- Alone Together (1990)
- Happy Holidays (1990)
- Steve & Eydie and Friends Celebrate Gershwin (1990)
- Steve & Eydie and Friends Celebrate Porter (1990)
- Steve & Eydie and Friends Celebrate Berlin (1990)
- Together on Broadway/Two on the Isle (2001)
- To You from Us (2009)
- Cozy/A Man & a Woman (2013)
- Cozy/Two on the Isle (2013)
- Great American songbook (2013)
- Original Hits (2024)

With Trio Los Panchos

- Amor (Great Love Songs in Spanish) (1964)
- More Amor (1965)
- Navidad Means Christmas (1966)
- Cuatro Vidas (1970)

== Filmography ==
- The Kraft Music Hall (1 episode, 1969) as an unnamed girl
- The Tim Conway Comedy Hour (1 episode, 1970) as herself
- Here's Lucy (1 episode, 1973) as herself
- Sanford and Son (1 episode, 1975) as herself
- Alice in Wonderland (television movie, 1985) as Tweedle Dee
- Life with Lucy (13 episodes, 1986) as co-writer and singer of the theme song
- Empty Nest (1 episode, 1994) as an unnamed heckler
- Frasier (1 episode, 1994) as the voice of Lois
- The Nanny (1 episode, 1995) as herself
- Ocean's Eleven (movie, 2001) as herself

== Music samples ==
Sample of "Too Close For Comfort" by Eydie Gormé
Performed in 1957

Butterfly
performed by Gormé in 1972
