= Jangada =

Brazilian sailboat

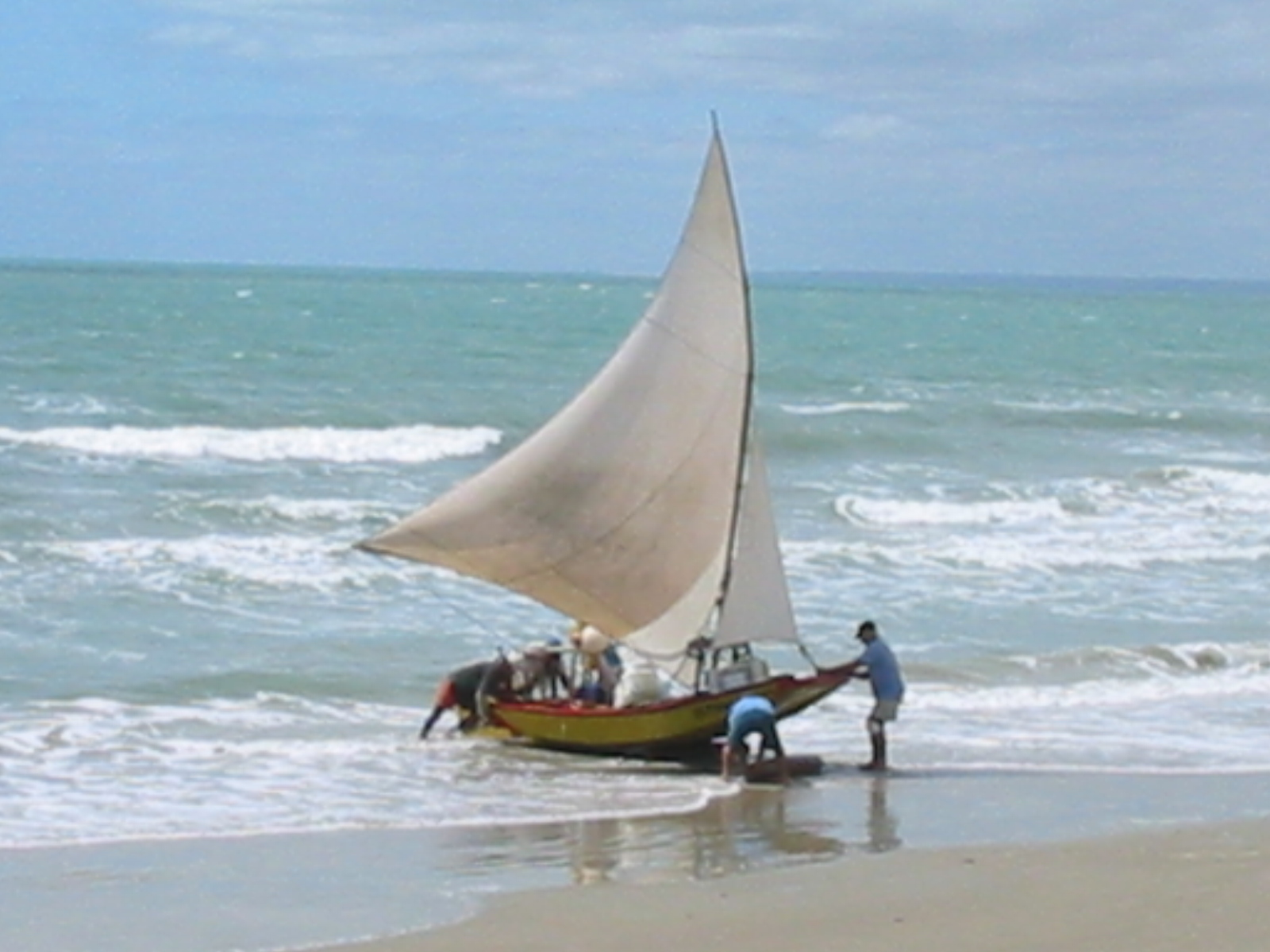
Jangada on the coast off Mossoró city.

A jangada (/dʒəŋˈɡɑːdə/ jəng-GAH-də; Portuguese: [ʒɐ̃ˈɡadɐ]) (Note: The Portuguese word jangada is ultimately derived from Sanskrit संघाट saṃghāṭa, via Malayalam ചങ്ങാടം [tʃɐŋːaːɖɐm].) is a wooden fishing boat or sailing raft used in the northern region of Brazil.

The construction of the jangada incorporates some improvements in Neolithic handcraft – better materials were found and the physics of sailing was better observed through experimentation. The details are closely guarded by artisans.

Its triangular sail makes use of some effects of fluid dynamics. Also known as a "latin" sail, it allows one to sail against the wind, taking advantage of the pressure difference on the air that rises on its external face (the one that becomes convex for the internal wind pressure) and its internal face (the one that becomes concave, the side where the sailor goes). Some big watercraft also used the Latin sail, but in a limited manner, because its successful use was crucially dependent on the presence of the sailor, who must be aware of the wind movements: the pressure difference is manipulated constantly whilst sailing against the wind. The same principles are used to keep a plane in the air, thanks to its wing geometry.

In the jangada, there is a graceful, almost parabolic curve on the upper part of the triangle, and another one more extended and short, below. This asymmetry is due to the deft manipulation of the mast, which turns gently – this time using the lever mechanic principle – around its axis.

== Construction ==
Its construction depends on the correct use of materials such as fluctuation woods (like the Brazilian balsa, and other rare species), artisan tissues and ropes. The traditional jangada doesn't have any metallic elements like nails; its structure is completely put together with joints and lashings using ropes made of hand-woven fibers.

The jangada is typically made using 6 wooden logs rafted together in parallel: two in the center (called meios, or central ones), 2 more on either side of those (called mimburas, a Tupi word), and 2 on the outside, called bordos. The 4 most central logs (meios and mimburas) are united using hard wooden pegs, made of stronger wood than the logs. The bordos are then bound to the mimburas using more wooden pegs, so they can be more elevated.

On this basic platform, two wooden seats are installed, each one supported by 4 elegant wooden rods, locked on the mimburas. On these rods, a piece of wood is fixed to make the seat. The most central seat supports the jangada's mast. The other seat, also called the "master seat", because the man who sits on it sails and steers the jangada with an oar. The master's oar is fixed between one of the mimburas and one of the meios. There is another opening between the two meios to allow for the bolina board (from the English "bowline"). This board acts as a centerboard, and can be adjusted in height and angle (in a more limited way, on the medial plan of the watercraft). The bolina board reduces the sideways motion of the jangada when it is sailed close-hauled.

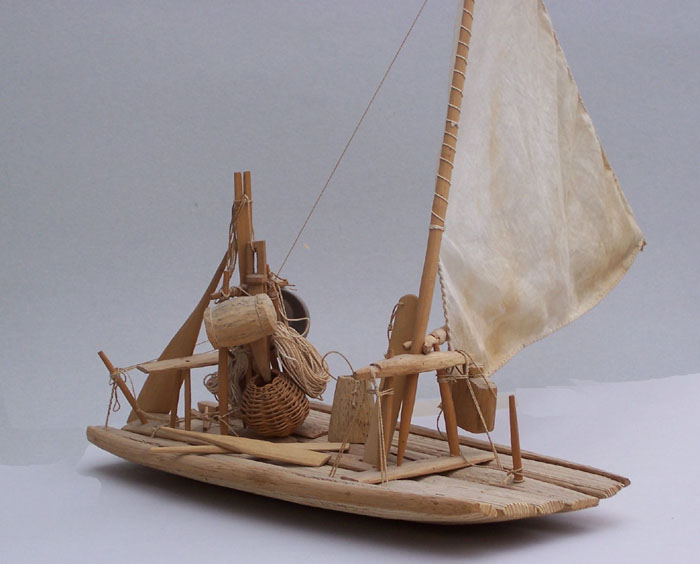
Model of a Jangada

All of the traditional jangada's components are handmade, from the mast to the sail, the ropes to the sailing seat, fishing nets, fishing hooks, anchors, and the boxes used to keep fish and belongings.

Its crew, on the traditional versions of the jangada, ranges from 3 to 5 people. This group works on a space of approximately 5 to 7 meters, on average (although there are jangadas larger than 8 meters), and a space of 1.4 to 1.7 meters on its smaller extension.

Its dimensions are the results of a series of nautical limitations, including: the size of the available wood, the resistance of the joints and lashings, the necessary strength to move it over the waves, the size of the sail and the work the wind makes over them, the human force needed, so that just one man (one at a time, taking turns) can operate it. It is ergonomically designed and administrated, when this artisan watercraft is examined through the eyes of modern designers.

The traditional fisherman always obeyed the known rules of the use of the tides, the wind rules, the currents and the seasonal effects on fishing. Due to these factors the incursions on the sea vary much in relation to the duration of the voyage, the course followed and the type of fish netted. A common voyage used to last three days to a week (sometimes more, according to old fishermen) on the high seas, up to 120 km from the coast. This type of voyage is getting rarer as the jangada sailor now rarely sails for more than three days and will sail no farther than 50 km out from the coast. At the same time groups of jangadas voyaging together are getting rarer; the most common voyage now is a single fishing crew on a single jangada.

However, in many points along the coast especially Ceará, there are jangada races, being very famous the one that occurs on the Mucuripe port, Fortaleza. Dozens of jangadas take part on popular competitions, in a single spectacle on the broad Brazilian coast.

== Popularity in the isolated Brazilian north ==
The jangada reached Brazil as a part of the rich exchange between India, Africa, China, and Japan, mostly in the two first centuries of the Brazilian colonization by the Portuguese people. It also uses native Brazilian techniques for the cutting and processing of wood, and the weaving of fibers into rope. It comes from the people involved with shipping other people, goods, animals, plants, knowledge, and of course, the knowledge from the sailors of the Indian Ocean and the Mozambique coast, who used fishing boats similar to the Brazilian jangada.

The word jangada brings this Asiatic origin. It comes from "jangada", a word from Malayalam and South Asian languages. In Southern India, the Portuguese saw a small local boat named jang, three or four wood timbers tied with vegetal fibers. The Portuguese described such a boat as jangá, changgh, or xanga. Jangada (or Chabgadam) was its augmentative, a big janga, built with five or six timbers.

The first jangada sailors were part of the diverse groups of immigrants that populated the interior of the Brazilian north during the middle of the 17th century. The jangada's ability to sail upwind made it ideal to navigate this part of the coast prior to the arrival of motorized boats in the 19th century. These immigrants brought and raised cattle, whose meat fed the mining workers.

Today jangadas are found only in the northern region of Brazil between Pernambuco and Piauí. The reason that jangada sailors are not found all over the Brazilian coast is due a quirk of history: by law, sailing craft not controlled by the Portuguese were systematically eliminated. This law was introduced in the 17th century with the exploration of Minas Gerais (central-southern area of Brazil) in order to halt illegal gold trafficking. At that time, the north Brazilian coast was sparsely populated and impassable for transatlantic sailing ships, since it is buffeted by the powerful ocean currents from Guyana, which made it very difficult for the European boats to sail in.

Knowledge of constructing this family of artisan watercraft is nearing extinction – although there are still communities of fishermen present from the original group to occupy the Brazilian coast, the traditional jangada is no longer built from logs of varying size. The current jangada is made from industrial wooden boards, or formed with mechanical cutting instruments. A traditionally built jangada is in the collection of the National Maritime Museum Cornwall.

== Cultural references ==
=== It's All True ===
It's All True is an unfinished feature film by Orson Welles that comprises three stories about Latin America. The third part of the film, "Jangadeiros" (also known as "Four Men on a Raft"), was shot in Brazil in 1942, while Welles was on a goodwill mission for the Office of the Coordinator of Inter-American Affairs, to support the war effort as part of the Good Neighbor Policy. The film was intended to emphasize the dignity of working people and celebrate the cultural and ethnic diversity of the Americas.

Welles chose to do "Jangadeiros" after reading an article in the December 8, 1941, issue of Time magazine that related the story of four impoverished Brazilian fishermen who set sail from Fortaleza on the jangada São Pedro in September 1941. Led by Manoel Olimpio Meira (called "Jacaré"), the jangadeiros were protesting over an economically exploitative system in which all fishermen were forced to give half of their catch to the jangada owners. The remaining half barely supported the men and their families. Jangadeiros also were not eligible for social security benefits accorded other Brazilians. After 61 days and 1,650 miles without any navigating instruments, braving the elements and making friendly stops along the way, they sailed into Rio de Janeiro harbor as national heroes. The four men arrived in what was then the Brazilian capital to file their grievances directly to President Getúlio Vargas. The result was a bill that was signed into law by President Vargas that entitled the jangadeiros to the same benefits awarded to all union laborers — retirement funds, pensions for widows and children, housing, education and medical care. Welles regarded "Jangadeiros" as the most valuable story in the film.

Welles's relationship with his studio, RKO Pictures, deteriorated while he was in Latin America. He was allowed to finish filming the reenactment of the jangadeiros' epic voyage with a minimal budget and crew, but when he returned to the United States, RKO ended its contract with him. Welles tried to persuade other movie studios to finance the completion of the project, but It's All True was eventually abandoned.

In 1981, 250 metal film cans containing black-and-white nitrate negative were discovered in a film vault. The distinctive shots of the "Jangadeiros" sequence identified the footage as being part of the unrealized film, It's All True. The film was preserved at the UCLA Film and Television Archive, and Welles's executive assistant, Richard Wilson, accepted the task of making sense of the recovered footage. He identified about seven hours of the "Jangedeiros" footage shot at Fortaleza. He edited some of the film into a coherent ten-minute sequence, which was used in a 22-minute film that was titled It's All True: Four Men on a Raft (1986). The short film was created to help raise funds for the preservation and transfer of the film from nitrate to safety stock — a process that is still far from complete.

Wilson was also the driving force behind the making of the 1993 documentary feature, It's All True: Based on an Unfinished Film by Orson Welles, which concludes with a reconstruction of "Jangadeiros". The documentary was named the year's Best Non-Fiction Film by the Los Angeles Film Critics Association, and its filmmakers received a special citation from the National Society of Film Critics. -

=== The Last Sailors: The Final Days of Working Sail ===
In 1984, Orson Welles narrated a documentary series created by Neil Hollander, The Last Sailors: The Final Days of Working Sail, that includes a 12-minute segment on the jangadeiros of northern Brazil. The segment ends with three sails on the horizon: "The world of the jangadeiros. Elemental, unique, shrinking. A world whose end is in sight."

=== Barravento ===
In Barravento (lit. "The Turning Wind"), a 1962 Brazilian drama film directed by Glauber Rocha, jangadas appear throughout.

=== Suíte do Pescador ===
Begins from the words 'Minha jangada vai sair pro mar".
