= Willard Park =

Willard Park may refer to:

- Willard Zerbe Park (1906–1965), American anthropologist and Soviet agent
- Willard Park, Cleveland, a park in downtown Cleveland, Ohio, US
- Willard Park, a park in Indianapolis, Indiana, US
