= It's All True: Based on an Unfinished Film by Orson Welles =

- Theatrical release poster
- Directed by: Bill Krohn; Myron Meisel; Richard Wilson
- Written by: Bill Krohn; Richard Wilson; Myron Meisel
- Produced by: Régine Konckler; Bill Krohn; Myron Meisel; Jean-Luc Ormières; Richard Wilson
- Narrated by: Miguel Ferrer
- Cinematography: Gary Graver
- Edited by: Ed Marx
- Music by: Jorge Arriagada (original score)
- Distributed by: Canal Plus/Paramount Pictures
- Release date: October 15, 1993 (United States)
- Running time: 85 minutes
- Country: United States
- Languages: English; Portuguese
- Box office: 28,164 admissions (France)

It's All True: Based on an Unfinished Film by Orson Welles is a 1993 documentary film about Orson Welles's ill-fated Pan-American anthology film It's All True, shot in 1941–42 but never completed. Written and directed by Richard Wilson, Bill Krohn and Myron Meisel, the film is narrated by Miguel Ferrer. It was named the year's Best Non-Fiction Film by the Los Angeles Film Critics Association, and its filmmakers received a special citation from the National Society of Film Critics.

== Background ==
It's All True is an unfinished Orson Welles feature film comprising three stories about Latin America. "My Friend Bonito" was supervised by Welles and directed by Norman Foster in Mexico in 1941. "Carnaval" (also known as "The Story of Samba") and "Jangadeiros" (also known as "Four Men on a Raft") were directed by Welles in Brazil in 1942. It's All True was to have been Welles's third film for RKO Radio Pictures, after Citizen Kane (1941) and The Magnificent Ambersons (1942). The project was a co-production of RKO and the Office of the Coordinator of Inter-American Affairs that was later terminated by RKO.

While some of the footage shot for It's All True was repurposed or sent to stock film libraries, approximately 200,000 feet of the Technicolor nitrate negative, most of it for the "Carnaval" episode, was dumped into the Pacific Ocean in the late 1960s or 1970s. In the 1980s a cache of nitrate negative, largely black-and-white, was found in a vault and presented to the UCLA Film and Television Archive. A 2000 inventory indicated that approximately 50,000 feet of It's All True had been preserved, with approximately 130,045 feet of the deteriorating nitrate not yet preserved.

== Production ==
The driving force behind It's All True: Based on an Unfinished Film by Orson Welles was Richard Wilson, who collaborated with Welles on It's All True and most of his stage productions, radio shows, and other feature films. In 1986, a year after Welles died, Wilson, along with Bill Krohn, the Los Angeles correspondent for Cahiers du cinéma, made a 22-minute trailer to raise money for the project. They were joined by film critic Myron Meisel the next year and Catherine Benamou in 1988. Benamou, a Latin American and Caribbean specialist fluent in the dialect spoken by the jangadeiros, performed the field research and conducted interviews with the film's original participants in Mexico and Brazil. Eventually, Balenciaga agreed to finance completion in exchange for distribution rights in France, Germany and Italy. But the footage was owned by Paramount, which inherited it when it bought RKO. Then in 1991, Michael Schlesinger, then head of Paramount Repertory, scored a huge hit with a 50th anniversary reissue of Citizen Kane. Meisel, Krohn and Wilson reached out to him about using Kane's success to convince Paramount to make a deal for what would essentially be a free movie. (During this time, Wilson was diagnosed with cancer, which he only disclosed to family and close friends, and died later that year.) Schlesinger happily came on board, but it took more than a year of negotiating before Paramount finally agreed. The film was completed in 1993 and had its world premiere at the New York Film Festival.

== Reception ==
In 1993, New York Times film critic Vincent Canby called the documentary "a must see":

In terms of cinema history and scholarship, the highlight of this year's New York Film Festival is the presentation of It's All True: Based on an Unfinished Film by Orson Welles. ... This documentary is a long, seductive footnote to a cinema legend.

Film critic Jonathan Rosenbaum called the film "an exemplary, scrupulously researched documentary about the making and unmaking of Orson Welles's 1942 Latin American documentary feature It's All True—a project doomed by a change of studio heads at RKO, but also by its radical politics: Welles's problack stance and his focus on the poorest sectors of Brazilian life upset RKO and the Brazilian dictatorship alike. (His career never fully recovered from the ensuing studio propaganda, and this film represents the first major effort after half a century of obfuscation to set the record straight.)"

"It's been a long time coming," wrote Chicago Tribune film critic Michael Wilmington, "because the It's All True saga has been, until now, the saddest and most frustrating in all of the cinema."

In The Washington Post, Desson Howe reported a succinct history of the original project and its consequences for Welles, then turned to the 1993 documentary and "Jangadeiros" reconstruction: "If nothing else, this brings a chapter of his troubled career to light and tells us of four determined men who—like Welles—fought the current every bit of the way.

"Despite the filmmakers' obvious reverence for Welles, this documentary is marred, ironically, by the very way it presents the original material," wrote TV Guide. "The newly-composed score to 'Four Men on a Raft' has a symphonic, romanticized quality that nearly destroys the quiet dignity of the images. ... [The film] illustrates the opposite approach to film reconstruction taken with ¡Que viva México! (1930–32), Sergei Eisenstein's own 'lost' Latin American project: this academic study film eschews the more traditional mediating elements of music and voiceovers, presenting the raw footage without any sound."

== Accolades ==
It's All True: Based on an Unfinished Film by Orson Welles was named the year's Best Non-Fiction Film by the Los Angeles Film Critics Association. Its filmmakers received a special citation from the National Society of Film Critics, which also nominated the film as best documentary.

== Home media ==
- 2004: Paramount (Full Screen Collection), Region 1 DVD, November 30, 2004
