= Rich Man, Poor Man Book II =

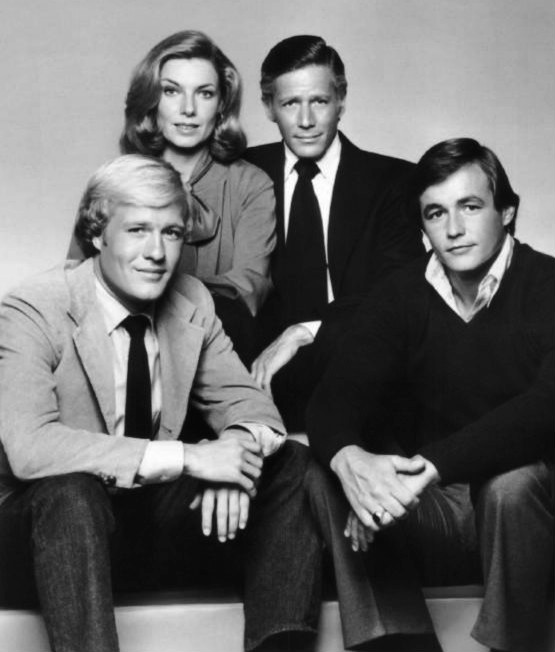
- The main characters. Standing: Maggie Porter and Rudy Jordache. Seated: Wesley Jordache and Billy Abbott.
- Based on: Characters created by Irwin Shaw
- Written by: Ann M. Beckett; Michael Gleason; Robert Hamilton; Millard Lampell; Robert Presnell, Jr. Elizabeth Wilson
- Directed by: Lou Antonio; Karen Arthur; Bill Bixby; Joan Darling; Harry Falk; David Friedkin; Jules Irving; Ted Post; Alex Segal; James Sheldon; Paul Stanley
- Starring: Peter Strauss; Gregg Henry; James Carroll Jordan
- Theme music composer: Alex North; Michael Isaacson
- Country of origin: United States
- Original language: English
- No. of episodes: 21

Production
- Executive producers: Harve Bennett; Michael Gleason
- Producers: Jon Epstein; Carl Vitale
- Running time: 46–49 mins.

Original release
- Network: ABC
- Release: September 21, 1976 – March 8, 1977

Related
- Rich Man, Poor Man

Rich Man, Poor Man Book II is an American television miniseries that aired on ABC in one-hour episodes at 9:00pm ET/PT on Tuesday nights between September 21, 1976 and March 8, 1977. A sequel to Rich Man, Poor Man that had aired the previous season, it focused on the further exploits and conflicts of the Jordache family.

Due to the popularity of the first series this was rushed out as the sequel before the author Irwin Shaw had even written a "Book 2" sequel. This was later to be "Beggarman Thief" which became Irwins actual follow up story but it had a totally different cast to the original series.

== Synopsis ==
The series began shortly after the death of Tom Jordache. His son Wesley (Gregg Henry) is now in the care of Tom's brother Rudy (Peter Strauss), who was seeking a seat in the United States Senate. Also living in the household was Billy, Rudy's stepson, and much of the ongoing storyline concentrated on the tension between the two ambitious boys. Also crucial to the plot was Rudy's protracted battle with Charles Estep (Peter Haskell), the mysterious billionaire owner of Tricorp. Returning from the original series was Anthony Falconetti (William Smith), who had served time for the murder of Tom Jordache and was now free and intent on disposing of Rudy as well.

At the same time, Falconetti firmly intends to eliminate Rudy, Wesley and all the friends of the Jordache family and this time it will not be enough to ignore it to escape him.

== Cast ==
Davey Davison replaces Kim Darby as Virginia Calderwood. Peter Strauss, Susan Blakely, Herbert Jefferson Jr., Van Johnson, Kay Lenz, Tim McIntire, Ray Milland, Dick Sargent and William Smith reprise their roles from the original series.

Actor	Role
Starring
Peter Strauss	Rudy Jordache
Special guest star
Susan Blakely	Julie Prescott
Introducing
Gregg Henry	Wesley Jordache
James Carroll Jordan	Billy Abbott
Guest stars
Dimitra Arliss	Maria Falconetti
Davey Davison	Virginia Calderwood
Herbert Jefferson Jr.	Roy Dwyer
Van Johnson	Marsh Goodwin
Kay Lenz	Kate Jordache
Tim McIntire	Brad Knight
Ray Milland	Duncan Calderwood
Claudette Nevins	Mrs. Martindale
William Redfield	Mr. Martindale
Dick Sargent	Eddie Heath
William Smith	Anthony Falconetti
Susan Sullivan	Maggie Porter
John Anderson	John "Scotty" Scott
Sorrell Booke	Phil Greenberg
Peter Haskell	Charles Estep
Penny Peyser	Ramona Scott
James B. Sikking	Matthew Downey
Larry Kert	Danny Miller
Arlo Guthrie	Himself
Cassie Yates	Annie Adams
Kimberly Beck	Diane Porter
Peter Donat	Arthur Raymond
Laraine Stephens	Claire Estep
Lynn Carlin	Sarah Hunt
Madeleine Thornton-Sherwood	Mrs. Hunt
Russell Johnson	Detective
George Gaynes	Max Vincent
Dennis James	Telethon Host
G. D. Spradlin	Senator Dillon
Barry Sullivan	Senator Paxton
Philip Abbott	John Franklin
Ken Swofford	Al Barber
Nehemiah Persoff	Charles Dietrich

== Episodes ==
No.	Title	Directed by	Written by	Original release date
1	"Chapter I"	Lou Antonio	Millard Lampell	September 21, 1976
2	"Chapter II"	Alex Segal	Ann M. Beckett	September 28, 1976
3	"Chapter III"	Bill Bixby	Robert Presnell, Jr.	October 5, 1976
4	"Chapter IV"	David Friedkin	Irwin Shaw & Millard Lampell	October 19, 1976
5	"Chapter V"	Harry Falk	Ann M. Beckett	October 26, 1976
6	"Chapter VI"	James Sheldon	Millard Lampell	November 9, 1976
7	"Chapter VII"	Harry Falk	Robert Presnell, Jr.	November 16, 1976
8	"Chapter VIII"	Joan Darling	Elizabeth Wilson	November 23, 1976
9	"Chapter IX"	Jules Irving	Millard Lampell	November 30, 1976
10	"Chapter X"	Karen Arthur	Elizabeth Wilson	December 7, 1976
11	"Chapter XI"	Jules Irving	Ann M. Beckett	December 21, 1976
12	"Chapter XII"	Ted Post	Millard Lampell	December 28, 1976
13	"Chapter XIII"	Jules Irving	Michael Gleason	January 4, 1977
14	"Chapter XIV"	Ted Post	Elizabeth Wilson & Ann M. Beckett	January 11, 1977
15	"Chapter XV"	Jules Irving	Michael Gleason	January 18, 1977
16	"Chapter XVI"	Paul Stanley	Michael Gleason	February 1, 1977
17	"Chapter XVII"	Jules Irving	Ann M. Beckett	February 8, 1977
18	"Chapter XVIII"	Bill Bixby	Michael Gleason	February 15, 1977
19	"Chapter XIX"	Jules Irving	Robert Hamilton	February 22, 1977
20	"Chapter XX"	James Sheldon	Ann M. Beckett	March 1, 1977
21	"Chapter XXI"	Jules Irving	Michael Gleason	March 8, 1977

== Production ==
Arlo Guthrie performed part of Alice's Restaurant in episode 4 airing October 19, 1976.

== Critical response ==
Rich Man, Poor Man Book II Nielsen ratings saw an average of 21.6 million viewers for the season placing it 21st.

=== Reception ===
Las Vegas and Aspen, playgrounds of the rich and famous and powerful, were two of the settings for the series. Filled with soap opera-like touches, it was far more melodramatic than the original and not as successful critically or in the ratings. The series maintained a popular following in the UK and Europe and was released on a 6-Disc DVD set by Universal-Playback on June 18, 2007. The US DVD set contained both the original mini-series and the weekly series and was released for the first time by A & E Home Video on September 28, 2010.

Gary Deeb of the Chicago Tribune wrote that ABC was taking a gamble with the series after Nick Nolte refused to appear in the sequel as Tom Jordache.

Douglas M. Snauffer wrote in his book Prime Time Soap Operas that Rich Man, Poor Man Book II failed as a TV series.

== Awards and nominations ==
Award	Category	Nominee(s)	Result	Ref.
American Cinema Editors Awards	Best Edited Episode from a Television Series	Jerrold L. Ludwig (for "Chapter XV")	Nominated	
Directors Guild of America Awards	Outstanding Directorial Achievement in Dramatic Series – Night	Bill Bixby (for "Chapter III")	Nominated	
Primetime Emmy Awards	Outstanding Lead Actress for a Single Appearance in a Drama or Comedy Series	Susan Blakely (for "Chapter I")	Nominated	
Primetime Emmy Awards	Outstanding Film Editing in a Drama Series	Jerrold L. Ludwig (for "Chapter III")	Nominated	
TP de Oro	Best Foreign Series		3rd Place	
TP de Oro	Best Foreign Actor	Peter Strauss	Won	
TP de Oro	Most Popular Personage	William Smith	2nd Place	
Writers Guild of America Awards	Episodic Drama	Millard Lampell	Nominated	
