= Jangada River =

Jangada River may refer to:

- Jangada River (Iguazu River), a river of Santa Catarina state in southeastern Brazil
- Jangada River (Piquiri River), a river of Paraná state in southern Brazil

== See also ==
- Jangada
