= Raw Wind in Eden =

1958 film

- Directed by: Richard Wilson
- Screenplay by: Elizabeth Wilson; Richard Wilson
- Based on: Dan Lundberg; Elizabeth Wilson (From a story by)
- Produced by: William Alland
- Starring: Esther Williams; Jeff Chandler
- Cinematography: Enzo Serafin
- Edited by: Russell F. Schoengarth
- Music by: Hans J. Salter
- Color process: Eastmancolor
- Production company: Universal International Pictures
- Distributed by: Universal Pictures
- Release dates: August 5, 1958 (Atlantic City); September 19, 1958 (New York City)
- Running time: 93 minutes
- Country: United States
- Language: English
- Box office: $1.1 million

Raw Wind in Eden is a 1958 American CinemaScope film noir directed by Richard Wilson and starring Esther Williams and Jeff Chandler.

== Plot ==
Frustrated while having a fling with a married man, fashion model Laura is persuaded to fly in playboy Wally Drucker's private plane to a party aboard a yacht. The plane crashes near a small Mediterranean island, where a man named Moore, the native Urbano, and the latter's daughter, Costanza, seem to be the only people there.

Laura is unhurt but Wally's injuries are treated by Moore, a former World War II medic. Moore is vague about his past or why he is living in this solitary fashion. Laura's interest in him makes Drucker jealous and irritates Costanza, who is herself desired by an older man from a nearby island who wishes to marry her.

A beached yacht belonging to Moore is found. It turns out he was a wealthy man from North Carolina suspected of murdering his wife, who drunkenly fell from the boat and drowned. Moore gave his millions to charity and dropped out of sight. Moore must fight the other men for Laura, who then persuades him to sail back to America and begin a new life.

== Cast ==
- Esther Williams as Laura
- Jeff Chandler as Mark Moore / Scott Moorehouse
- Rossana Podestà as Costanza Verno
- Carlos Thompson as Wally Drucker
- Rik Battaglia as Gavino
- Eduardo De Filippo as Urbano Verno

== Production ==
The film was originally known as The Islander.

John Gavin was meant to appear in the film. Accordingly, he was replaced on The Female Animal by George Nader. However, Gavin did not make the cast.

Filming started in Italy in June 1957. It was shot off the Tuscan coast between Rome and Pisa.

It was the last film made by William Alland under his long term arrangement with Universal.

== See also ==
- List of American films of 1958
