= George Fanto =

Hungarian cinematographer (1911–2000)

- Born: 4 August 1911; Budapest, Hungary
- Died: 14 April 2000 (aged 88); Stamford, Connecticut; United States
- Occupation: Cinematographer
- Years active: 1938-1952 (film)

George Fanto (1911–2000) was a Hungarian-born cinematographer. Fanto made films in different countries, but most notably settled in Brazil where he worked in the local film industry including several films for the leading studio Cinédia. Fanto worked with Orson Welles when he was in Brazil for It's All True, his ultimately unfinished documentary about Brazilian life. During the project he and Welles developed a close friendship. Fanto was later employed on Welles' Othello (1951).

== Selected filmography ==
- The Black Corsair (1937)
- It's All True (1942, incomplete)
- Samba in Berlin (1943)
- The Naked Angel (1946)
- Othello (1951)

== Bibliography ==
- Callow, Simon. Orson Welles: Hello Americans. Random House, 2011.
- Stam, Robert. Tropical Multiculturalism: A Comparative History of Race in Brazilian Cinema. Duke University Press, 1997.
