= Elizabeth Wilson (screenwriter) =

American screenwriter and playwright

- Born: Elizabeth Vance Anderson; July 24, 1914; Tulsa, Oklahoma, USA
- Died: July 25, 2000; Santa Monica, California, USA
- Education: Hollywood High School
- Occupation(s): Screenwriter, TV writer
- Spouse: Richard Wilson
- Parent(s): Myrtle Owen and George Anderson

Elizabeth Wilson (1914-2000) was an American screenwriter, playwright, and TV writer active during the 1950s and 1960s; she was known for her work on Westerns.

== Biography ==
Elizabeth was the daughter of silent film actress Myrtle Owen and George Anderson. Although she was born in Oklahoma, she moved to Los Angeles as a young girl, where she attended and graduated from Hollywood High School. After graduation, she worked at the Stanley Rose bookstore on Hollywood Boulevard. She later worked as a journalist at magazines and newspapers.

In the 1950s, she and her husband, writer-director Richard Wilson, wrote Westerns together, including Invitation to a Gunfighter. In 1951, she was called to testify about her former ties to the Communist Party. She revealed that she had been a member from 1937 through 1947, and had worked on several projects that aimed to help elect candidates who the Communist Party favored.

== Selected filmography ==
- Invitation to a Gunfighter (1964)
- Raw Wind in Eden (1958)
- Cave of Outlaws (1951)
