= Cave of Outlaws =

1951 film by William Castle

- Theatrical release poster
- Directed by: William Castle
- Screenplay by: Elizabeth Wilson
- Story by: Elizabeth Wilson
- Produced by: Leonard Goldstein
- Starring: Macdonald Carey; Alexis Smith; Edgar Buchanan
- Cinematography: Irving Glassberg
- Edited by: Edward Curtiss
- Color process: Technicolor
- Production company: Universal Pictures
- Distributed by: Universal Pictures
- Release dates: October 12, 1951 (Iola, Kansas); December 7, 1951 (Los Angeles)
- Running time: 76 minutes
- Country: United States
- Language: English

Cave of Outlaws (also known as The Cave) is a 1951 American Western film directed by William Castle and starring Macdonald Carey and Alexis Smith.

== Plot ==
In 1880, Pete Carver is a member of a gang that robs a train for gold. They flee to a cave, where a posse chases and kills all of them except Pete, who insists that he does not know where the gold has been stashed. Pete serves 15 years in prison, and after his release, he is tracked by Wells Fargo agent Dobbs, who believes that Pete will find the hidden gold.

== Cast ==
- Macdonald Carey as Pete Carver
- Alexis Smith as Elizabeth Trent
- Edgar Buchanan as Dobbs
- Victor Jory as Ben Cross
- Hugh O'Brian as Garth
- Houseley Stevenson as Cooley
- Hugh Sanders as Sheriff
- Raymond Bond as Doc
- Robert Osterloh as Blackjack
- Russ Tamblyn as young Pete

== Production ==
The film is based on original story and screenplay written by Elizabeth Wilson. Filming was to have begun in February 1951 with Howard Duff in the lead, but Duff injured his leg and was replaced by Macdonald Carey. The start date was delayed until March 26.

The cave scenes were shot at the Carlsbad Caverns National Park in New Mexico in April. As the caves remained open to the general public during the day, the unit filmed at night.

Director William Castle wrote that "we lived underground like moles" and that "there was little excitement about the whole project".

== Text in opening credits ==
"All the cave scenes in this production were actually photographed at the Carlsbad Caverns in New Mexico".

"We gratefully acknowledge the assistance of the National Park Service of the United States Department of the Interior whose splendid cooperation made these scenes possible".

== Reception ==
In a contemporary review for the Chicago Tribune, critic Mae Tinee wrote: "Except for the fact that much of the action takes place in the Carlsbad caverns of New Mexico, this film is a routine second rater. The plot is both complicated and silly, embroidered with a good deal of cryptic conversation and what struck me as an unnecessary amount of violence. ... Caverns or no caverns, it's the same old stuff."
