= Gracias Amigos =

- Produced by: Office of the Coordinator of Inter-American Affairs
- Narrated by: Lowell Thomas
- Release date: 1944
- Running time: 16 minutes
- Country: United States
- Language: English

Gracias Amigos was a 1944 propaganda short produced by the Office of the Coordinator of Inter-American Affairs to educate the American public about the contributions of Latin America during World War II.

The short begins by describing the "island" of the United States, how self-sufficient it thought it was, and how it felt that the rise of the Axis powers wouldn't affect it. Then the audience is shown footage of the Japanese ambassador negotiating while Pearl Harbor is being bombed, and, in quick succession, the reverses at Wake Island, Manila, Bataan and Dutch Harbor. The American public realizes that it wasn't as self-sufficient as it had thought. A list of raw materials that were needed is given, along with the areas the United States was importing it from, now under Japanese control (including, incidentally, Philippine hemp, as mentioned in Hemp for Victory).

The narrator tells the audience that there were stores of those raw materials in the Western Hemisphere, but someone had to get them, and want to get them. So the Rio conference of 1942 is organized, and the various republics commit to solidarity to the US and the Allied cause. The film shows the many vital uses these resources are put to, including rubber and quinine.

Then the military aspects of Latin American involvement are discussed. The mobilization of the Latin America armies in anticipation of any Axis threat is discussed, as well as the clearing out of subversion and submarine watches. But most important, in the eyes of the film, is the base at Naha, Brazil, which was used to quickly transport military supplies from the US or Latin America, over the Atlantic, to Africa, and thence to the British armies in Egypt.

The Academy Film Archive preserved Gracias Amigos in 2012. The film is part of the Academy War Film Collection, one of the largest collections of World War II era short films held outside government archives.

== See also ==
- List of Allied propaganda films of World War II
