= Invitation to a Gunfighter =

1964 film by Richard Wilson

- Original film poster
- Directed by: Richard Wilson
- Written by: Hal Goodman; Larry Klein
- Screenplay by: Richard Wilson; Elizabeth Wilson
- Produced by: Richard Wilson
- Starring: Yul Brynner; Janice Rule; Brad Dexter; Alfred Ryder; Mike Kellin; George Segal; Clifford David; Pat Hingle
- Cinematography: Joseph MacDonald
- Edited by: Robert C. Jones
- Music by: David Raksin
- Production companies: Hermes Productions; Stanley Kramer Productions
- Distributed by: United Artists
- Release date: October 14, 1964
- Running time: 92 min.
- Country: United States
- Language: English
- Budget: $1.8 million
- Box office: $3.1 million

Invitation to a Gunfighter is a 1964 American DeLuxe Color Western film directed by Richard Wilson, starring Yul Brynner and George Segal. It was based on a 1957 teleplay by Larry Klein that appeared on Playhouse 90. A lone Creole gunfighter, Jules, burdened by his own past of dealing with racism and prejudices, ends up in a town dealing with its own racist and hypocritical ignominies. Jules attempts to learn the truth about the town's real motives for hiring him, while at the same time reconciling with his own past as he attempts to force the town's white folks to accept their own hypocritical shortcomings in living with their Mexican cohabitants.

== Plot ==
Confederate veteran Matt Weaver returns home to New Mexico after the Civil War and discovers that his farm was sold by an unscrupulous banker named Brewster, while his fiancee-to-be, Ruth, married another man while he was at war. Weaver's absence allowed Brewster to sway the town's occupants towards his own bigoted prejudices, racism and corrupt methods, all so that he can gain financial and peremptory control of the town. Weaver, already knowing full well what Brewster is like, wrests back control of his farm via an ill-enacted use of force. This results in the death of the husband of the couple residing on the farm, which was sold to them by Brewster, who had himself obtained it through illicit means.

Weaver only receives help from the town's Mexican inhabitants, who have always had good relationships with him. Although on the surface, it appears Ruth's husband and other Union sympathizers in town show hatred to Weaver's allegiance to the Rebels during the war, in reality, this is only a façade for deeper social and personal problems that are afflicting the town's white inhabitants. There is racism and an innate fecklessness to civil duty and social cohesion with each other and the town's non-white cohabitants, namely the Mexicans. This hypocritical irony of the town leads to many festered ill feelings towards Weaver. This is so much so, that the town turns against him and Brewster seeks to hire a gunfighter to get rid of Weaver and what he represents to a guilt ridden and shameless town of pro-Union hypocrites. Through a hapless arrival, a creole of color French gunman named Jules Gaspard d'Estaing decides to stay on in town after his stagecoach arrived for a rest stop and takes notice from afar of the attractive Ruth. Jules, who later teaches the ignorant town how to pronounce his name correctly in French, scares off the paid-for gunfighter sent by Brewster, and decides to take on himself the job of killing Weaver - at least, that's what the town folk believe.

No stranger himself to the abuses of racism (with a black mother and white well-to-do Southern father), Jules was raised with a cultured background, grounded in English and French, taught to play the harpsichord, outwardly appearing erudite and gentlemanly in appearance and manner, but raised to know his Creole place. Jules (the town folk refer to him derisively by calling him Jewel) then undertakes to find out what is really going on with the town, and why they have a lethal grudge against Weaver. Unexpectedly, Jules begins to impress certain townspeople with his gentlemanly ways, acts of civility and personal forms of justice. He even wins over some of them. While falling for the embittered Ruth who felt betrayed by Weaver for leaving her to go to war and ended up marrying a man she did not love, Jules finds that he now does not want to kill Weaver, but just to leave, and with Ruth. Jules tells Ruth about himself, and even though it is clear that Ruth finds much to admire in him, she tells him she will not go with him.

Disappointed with Ruth's rejection, Jules runs amok in the town, but not with wanton abandon. He targets the businesses that all represent what is wrong and plainly sick about the town. Connivingly, Brewster uses the leadership of the town to make peace with Weaver, by owning up to his dishonest taking of Weaver's farm. He gives back Weaver the deed to the farm and offers peace, but only on the proviso that Weaver deal with the gunfighter, who is presently ripping up the town. Weaver is hesitant, but Brewster unscrupulously uses Ruth, by saying that Jules, who has now shot her husband, is presently all alone with her. Weaver, who still loves Ruth, is enraged and agrees to make peace with the town, and go after Jules. As Weaver arrives in town, Jules is preparing to ride off. Jules is warned by the now befriended Mexicans that there is trouble coming.

At this point Weaver arrives and there is a tense stand-off between the two of them. It soon becomes apparent to Weaver what Jules' intentions are, and Brewster takes wind of this: he sneaks up to the two of them and attempts to shoot Jules. A flurry of gunshots is heard, with Weaver, Brewster and Jules in the middle of them, but only Jules is seriously shot. He is weakened but still in control of the situation, and forces Brewster to his knees and to apologize and admit all his crimes. It now becomes clear to everyone what Jules was really all about; he was the hand of retribution and atonement. Jules dies before Brewster is able to complete his attestation, but Weaver forces him to continue; Brewster goes for a gun and Weaver shoots him dead. The entire town, whites and Mexicans, surround Jules and together they all take his body away to be buried, while Ruth and Weaver clasp hands and follow together.

== Cast ==
- Yul Brynner as Jules Gaspard d'Estaing
- Janice Rule as Ruth Adams
- George Segal as Matt Weaver
- Alfred Ryder as Doc Barker
- Clifford David as Crane Adams
- Mike Kellin as Blind Union vet
- Brad Dexter as Kenarsie
- Pat Hingle as Sam Brewster
- Bert Freed as Sheriff
- John A. Alonzo as Manuel (Weaver's friend in Mexicantown) (as John Alonzo)
- Curt Conway as McKeever
- Clarke Gordon as Hickman
- Gerald Hiken as Gully
- Strother Martin as Fiddler
- Clifton James as Tuttle
- Dal Jenkins as Dancer

== Reception ==
Reviewing the film in 2022, film critic Brian Hannan wrote:

Yul Brynner (Villa Rides, 1968) has a peach of a part and does it more than justice. Often derided or ignored for his acting, this shows him at the peak of his powers, portraying a contradictory and conflicted character, arrogance tempered by depression ...
I certainly saw a different picture from the "offbeat but confusing western" viewed by Variety's critic and possibly, for once, because the passage of time has allowed this film to be seen in a new light. Rather than a morality play in the vein of High Noon, I recognized it as a character study of a gunfighter knocking on heaven's door.

The film recorded a loss of $900,000.

== See also ==
- List of American films of 1964
