= Genevieve Naylor =

American photographer and photojournalist (1915–1989)

- Born: February 12, 1915; Springfield, Massachusetts, U.S.
- Died: July 21, 1989 (aged 74)
- Known for: Photography
- Spouse: Misha Reznikoff
- Children: 2

Genevieve Naylor (February 12, 1915 – July 21, 1989) was an American photographer and photojournalist, best known for her photographs of Brazil and as Eleanor Roosevelt's personal photographer.

== Early life and education ==
Genevieve Naylor was born on February 12, 1915, in Springfield, Massachusetts. Her father, Emmett Hay Naylor, a trade association lawyer and her mother, Ruth Houston Caldwell, were married on January 17, 1914. Genevieve was given the middle name of Hay as a reference to family member John Hay, Abraham Lincoln's personal secretary. Her parents divorced in 1925, when Genevieve was 10 years old. She attended Miss Hall's School and later, at age 16, the Music Box, an arts school, where she studied painting. It was at the Music Box that Genevieve met Misha Reznikoff, her teacher. Two years later, in 1933, they were in love, and when Misha moved to New York, Genevieve soon followed, and they settled into the Bohemian lifestyle of Greenwich Village living in a studio apartment – a huge converted stable strewn with colorful painting and cigarette boxes and often home to parties with musicians, artists, and fans that lasted for days. In 1934, Naylor attended an exhibit by photographer Berenice Abbott and so admired Abbott's work that she switched from painting to photography. Naylor became Abbott's apprentice in 1935, and they maintained their professional relationship until Naylor's death.

== Career ==
At the age of 22, in 1937, Naylor was chosen by Holger Cahill of the Works Progress Administration (WPA) as a photographer for the Harlem Arts Center. She also worked for the WPA in New Hampshire, Pennsylvania, Washington D.C., and New York. She then worked for the Associated press and was one of the first women photojournalists to be hired by any American news wire services.

In 1940, Genevieve Naylor was assigned by the U.S. State department as part of a team to travel to Brazil. In an effort to further and strengthen the anti-Nazi relationship between the United States and Brazil and to promote mutual cultural awareness, the U.S. Office of Inter-American Affairs, under the leadership of Nelson Rockefeller, created a team of notable Americans that included Orson Welles, Errol Flynn, and Walt Disney. Genevieve Naylor and her partner (and later husband) Misha Reznikoff arrived in Brazil in October 1940, where he showed his paintings while Miss Naylor took photographs. Naylor's assignment was to document Brazil's progress toward becoming a modern nation, capture images that would boost war-time morale, foster cultural interchange, and promote the Allied cause. But Naylor, with her energetic and outgoing personality, soon ventured into other milieus, taking photographs of Brazilian workers jammed into trams, school children, religious and street festivals, and various aspects of everyday lives. Because it was war time, film was rationed, and Naylor's equipment was modest. She had neither flash nor studio lights and had to carefully choose her shots, balancing spontaneity with careful composition. Of her work, nearly 1,350 photos survived and were preserved. After her return to the states in 1943, Naylor become only the second woman photographer to be given a one-woman show when her work was exhibited by New York's Museum of Modern Art.

Naylor later spent 15 years as a photographer with Harper's Bazaar and from 1944 to 1980 was a freelance photographer for Vogue, McCall's, Town and Country, Life, Look, Saturday Evening Post, Women's Home Companion, Cosmopolitan, Fortune, Collier's, Glamour, Good Housekeeping, Vanity Fair, Elle, Ladies' Home Journal, Redbook, House Beautiful, Holiday, Mademoiselle, American Home, Seventeen, Better Homes and Gardens, Charm, Bride's, amongst others. She was a war time photographer, covering parts of the Korean War for Look magazine.

Naylor's work has been included in numerous group exhibitions in the United States, the UK, and Europe. The most recent, The New Women Behind the Camera 2021–2022, opened at The Metropolitan Museum of Art, in the summer of 2021, and will continue into 2022 at The National Gallery of Art in Washington, D.C. Her historic alliance with Brazil continues in 2022 with the SESC 24 de Maio, Sao Paulo, exhibition, Raio-Que-O-Parta: Modern Fictions in Brazil.

== Personal life ==
Naylor was married to painter Misha Reznikoff with whom she had two sons, Peter Reznikoff and Michael Reznikoff.
