= Neil Hollander =

American film producer (1939–2021)

- Born: Neil Gilbert Hollander; July 9, 1939; New York City, U.S.
- Died: June 17, 2021 (aged 81); Paris, France
- Occupations: Writer, film producer, film director

Neil Gilbert Hollander (July 9, 1939 – June 17, 2021) was an American writer, film director and producer, journalist and sailor. He sailed across the Atlantic, Pacific and Indian Oceans. He has conducted more than thirty interviews with Nobel Prize winners, and his work has been exhibited in a number of museums, among them the Smithsonian, the Deutsches Museum and the Jim Thompson House in Bangkok. As an author, he is largely collected by libraries worldwide.

== Biography ==
Neil Gilbert Hollander was born on July 9, 1939 in New York City. His younger sister is the lawyer Nancy Hollander, who represented some Guantanamo Bay prisoners. During his career, Hollander has gone through several professions and has lived in various parts of the world, including Thailand, Costa Rica, and France, where he now stays. His passion for sailing took him on a three-year trip across the sea, visiting sea ports around the world and witnessing the life of people who still make their living from the sea in the old traditions. The trip was documented in the 150-minutes video story The Last Sailors: The Final Days of Working Sail, narrated by Orson Welles.

Hollander lived and worked in Paris. He died of lung cancer in Paris on June 17, 2021, at the age of 80.

== Bibliography ==
- Call out the Jungle January 1976 ISBN 0-3404-2232-7
- The Courageous Voyage of Joan De Penguin January 1979 ISBN 0-7232-2276-2
- The Magic Clock June 1979 ISBN 0-7232-2180-4
- The Cook Is Captain June 1979 ISBN 0-7195-3497-6
- Penguin Voyages July 1979 ISBN 0-7232-2271-1
- The Great Voyage of Columbus Penguin July 1979 ISBN 0-7232-2272-X
- The Book of Paris September 1979 ISBN 0-2079-5610-3
- Sailor talk: Essential words and phrases in 6 languages December 1980 ISBN 0-7195-3735-5
- The Chocolate Feast May 1982 ISBN 0-7232-2905-8
- Chocolate Feast January 1984 ISBN 0-5907-0295-5
- The Great Zoo Break March 1985 ISBN 0-3402-8448-X
- The Yachtsman's Emergency Handbook: The Complete Survival Manual December 1986 ISBN 0-6880-6610-0
- The Last Sailors: The Final Days of Working Sail February 1987 ISBN 0-3124-7139-4
- Animal Day (Picture Knight) October 1988 ISBN 0-3404-8694-5
- Elusive Dove: The Search for Peace During World War I March 2014 ISBN 0-7864-7891-8

== Filmography ==
- Riding the Rails (1982)
- Birds of Passage (2001)
- The Last Sailors (1984)
- First Flights with Neil Armstrong (1991)
- Nobel Voices (2001)
- Gold Lust (1984)
- Touchia (1993)
- Germans and their Nazi Past (2004)
- Sea Devils (Tramps)(1998)
- Sea Dogs (Birds of Passage)(2001)
- H for Hunger (2009)
- Burma: A Human Tragedy (2011)
- Goldlust (2014)
- Under the Radar: Burma (2010)
