= Willard Zerbe Park =

American anthropologist (1906–1965)

Willard Zerbe Park (October 14, 1906 – April 15, 1965) was an American anthropologist. Park was a teaching colleague of Maurice Halperin at the University of Oklahoma. Both Park and Halperin actively sought out recruitment with Soviet intelligence, or the "Communist East" through the New Masses and Jacob Golos. Contacts were made with Elizabeth Bentley through Mary Price.

== Biography ==
He was born in Silt, Colorado. He received his A.B. degree in anthropology at the University of California, Berkeley and finished a year of graduate school also at Berkeley. At Berkeley he met his future wife, Susan Brandenstein (1908–1993), who was also an anthropology student.

Beginning in 1942 Park was the Assistant Chief of the Economic Analysis Section of the Office of the Coordinator of Inter-American Affairs (OCIAA), and later the United Nations Relief and Rehabilitation Administration.

In 1943 Park was interviewed in connection with a Hatch Act investigation. Much of Park's FBI file is redacted, including his background material, which usually includes routine items like a date of birth, parentage, education, and personal information.

He died in Reno, Nevada.
