= Misha Reznikoff =

American painter (1905–1971)

Misha Reznikoff (1905–1971) was an American-Ukrainian artist noted for such pictures as The End of the Horse – Or New Deal (1934) and The Solidity of the Road to Metaphor and Memory (1935). He was born in Kyiv, Russian Empire, in 1905 and died in New York in 1971. He was married to photographer Genevieve Naylor.

From 1940 to 1943, the couple was in Brazil as part of the cultural wing of the Office of the Coordinator of Inter-American Affairs, a program set by the Roosevelt Administration to promote American goodwill throughout Latin America. Reznikoff used techniques such as décollage and was described by Clement Greenberg as a "frail talent".

He was exhibited in galleries such as the Anita Shapolsky Gallery and the Michael Rosenfeld Gallery in New York City.
