= Office of the Coordinator of Inter-American Affairs =

Former U.S. government agency

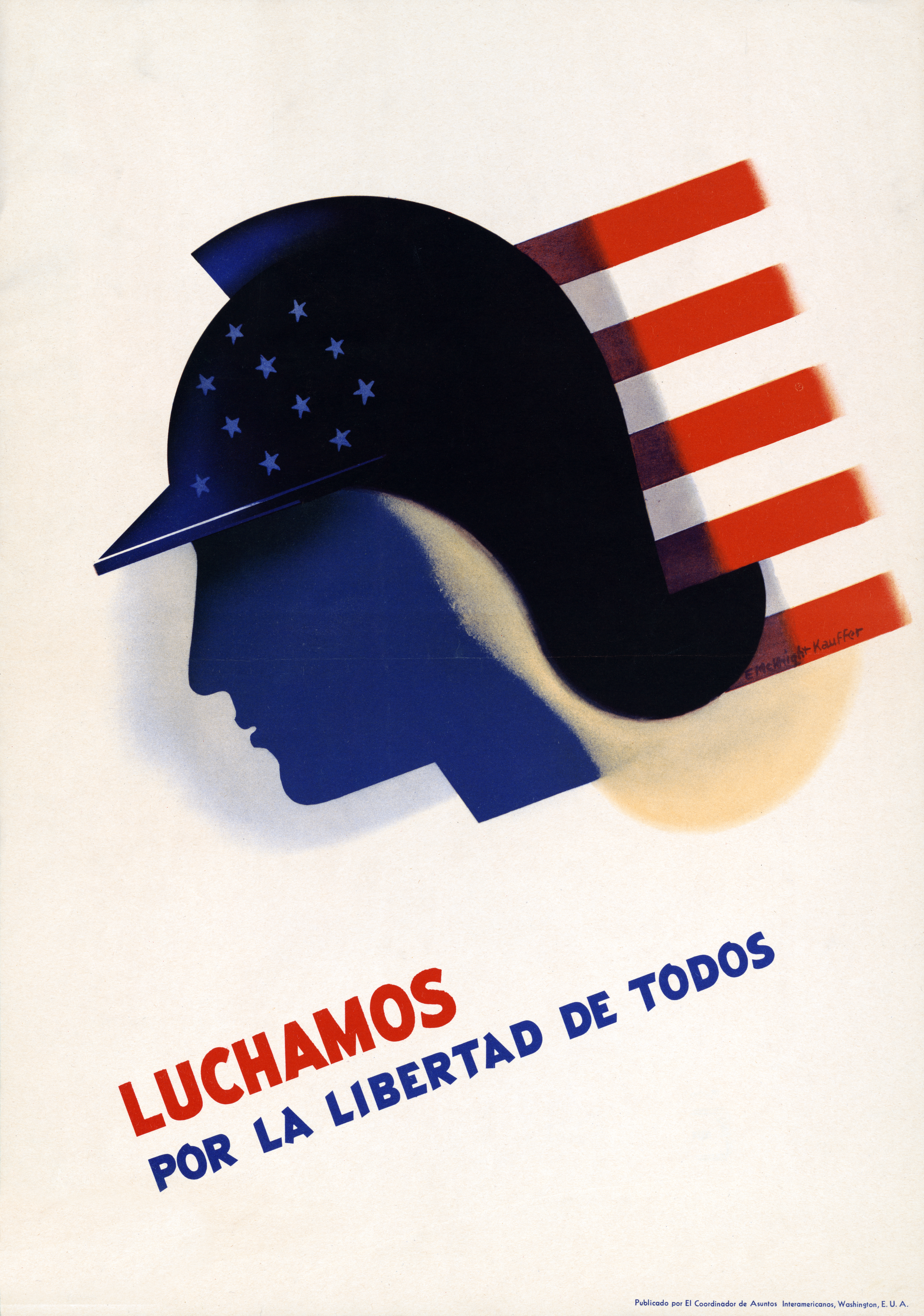
"We Fight for the Freedom of All" — OCIAA poster by Edward McKnight Kauffer, promoting inter-American solidarity

The Office of the Coordinator of Inter-American Affairs, later known as the Office for Inter-American Affairs, was a United States agency promoting inter-American cooperation (Pan-Americanism) during the 1940s, especially in commercial and economic areas. It was started in August 1940 as OCCCRBAR (Office for Coordination of Commercial and Cultural Relations between the American Republics) with Nelson Rockefeller as its head, appointed by President Franklin Delano Roosevelt.

The Office of Coordinator of Inter-American Affairs in the Executive Office of the President was formally established and enacted by US Executive Order 8840 on July 30, 1941, by President Roosevelt who named Nelson Rockefeller as the Coordinator of Inter-American Affairs (CIAA).

The agency's function was to counter Italian and German propaganda in the region. The FBI trained the secret police of friendly nations. German sales to military forces was displaced by American aid. Pro-German newspapers and radio stations were blacklisted. Government censorship was encouraged, while Latin America was blanketed with pro-American propaganda. The OCIAA grew to be a large Federal agency with a budget of $38 million and 1,500 employees by 1943. 1942.

It was later renamed the Office of Inter-American Affairs (OIAA) with slightly changed powers by Executive order 9532 on March 23, 1945.

== Mission ==
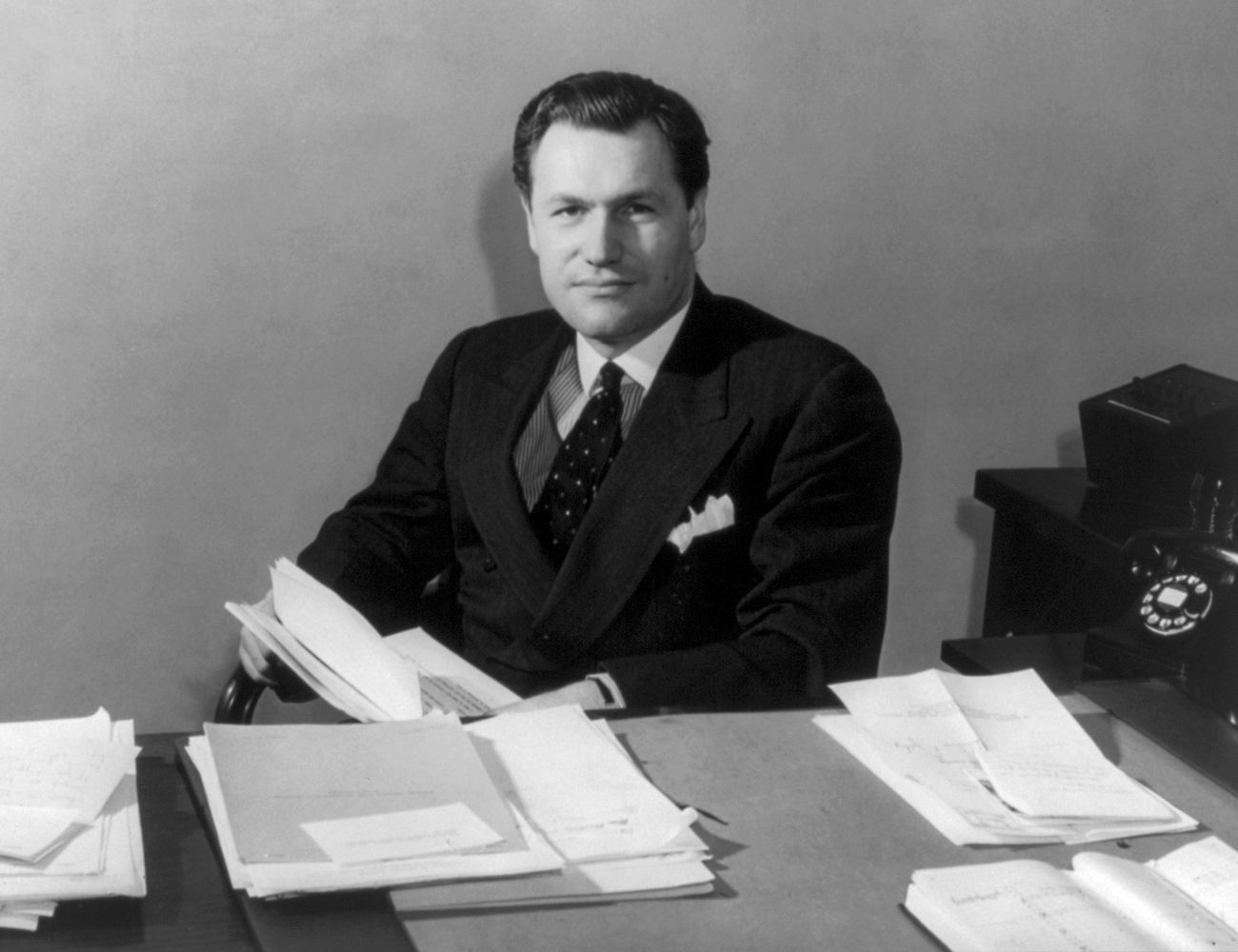
Nelson Rockefeller, Coordinator of Inter-American Affairs (1940)

The Office of the Coordinator of Inter-American Affairs was established in August 1940 by order of the U.S. Council of National Defense, and operated with funds from both the government and the private sector. By executive order July 30, 1941, President Franklin D. Roosevelt established the OCIAA within the Office for Emergency Management of the Executive Office of the President, "to provide for the development of commercial and cultural relations between the American Republics and thereby increasing the solidarity of this hemisphere and furthering the spirit of cooperation between the Americas in the interest of hemisphere defense."

The mission of the OCIAA was cultural diplomacy, promoting hemispheric solidarity and countering the growing influence of the Axis powers in Latin America. The OCIAA's Motion Picture Division played an important role in documenting history and shaping opinion toward the Allied nations, particularly after the U.S. entered World War II in December 1941. To support the war effort — and for their own audience development throughout Latin America — Hollywood studios partnered with the U.S. government on a nonprofit basis, making films and incorporating Latin American stars and content into their commercial releases.

External audio
- You may listen to the Alfredo Antonini CBS Tipica Orchestra performing with Juan Arvizu and John Serry Sr. in 1942 here

During the 1940s the CBS radio broadcasting network also contributed to the OCIAA's cultural initiatives by establishing the CBS Pan American Orchestra to showcase prominent musical artists from both North and South America on its Viva América program. Broadcasts to Latin America were coordinated by the OCIAA with CBS' La Cadena de las Américas (Network of the Americas) shortwave radio and radiotelephone systems as envisioned by William S. Paley. Included among the international contributors were: Alfredo Antonini (Italian-American conductor), Terig Tucci (Argentine composer), John Serry Sr. (Italian-American accordionist), Elsa Miranda (Puerto Rican vocalist), Eva Garza (Mexican-American vocalist), Nestor Mesa Chaires (Mexican tenor), Juan Arvizu (Mexican tenor), Manolita Arriola (Mexican vocalist) and Edmund A. Chester (American journalist). The OCIAA also supported cultural programming on the CBS radio network which included performances by such Hollywood luminaries as Edward G. Robinson and Rita Hayworth.

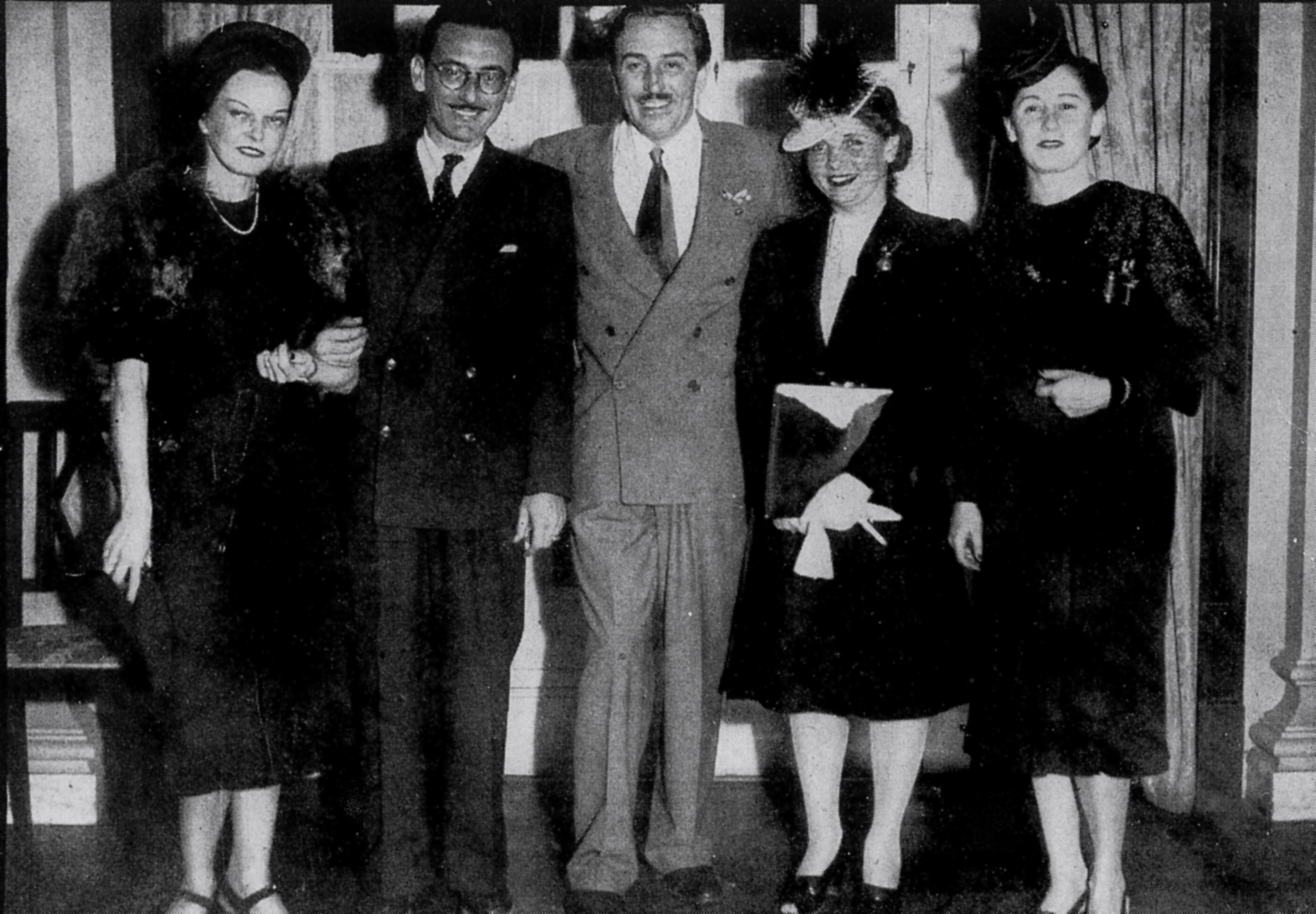
Brazilian composer Ari Barroso with Walt Disney and his wife during their visit to Brazil for the premiere of the film Saludos Amigos (1942)

Artists working in a variety of disciplines were appointed goodwill ambassadors to Latin America by the OCIAA, which also sponsored a variety of cultural tours. A select listing includes Misha Reznikoff and photojournalist Genevieve Naylor (October 1940–May 1943); Bing Crosby (August–October 1941); Walt Disney (August–October 1941); Aaron Copland (August–December 1941); George Balanchine and the American Ballet (1941); Orson Welles (1942); Rita Hayworth (1942); Grace Moore (1943); and John Ford and Gregg Toland (1943).

In addition, the R. H. Macy Co. collaborated with the OCIAA to showcase the culture, cuisine, fashion and music of various South-American nations at its flagship Herald Square store in 1942. The timing of Macy's Latin-American Fair was designed to coincide with the 1942 Inter-American Conference in Rio de Janeiro. Included in the exhibition were works of fine art from artists in Brazil, Argentina, Colombia, and Chile. It was mounted under the patronage of First Lady Eleanor Roosevelt with the cooperation of ambassadors from throughout South America to foster international goodwill. With this in mind, sections of the exposition were displayed in other department stores throughout the United States.

== Activities ==
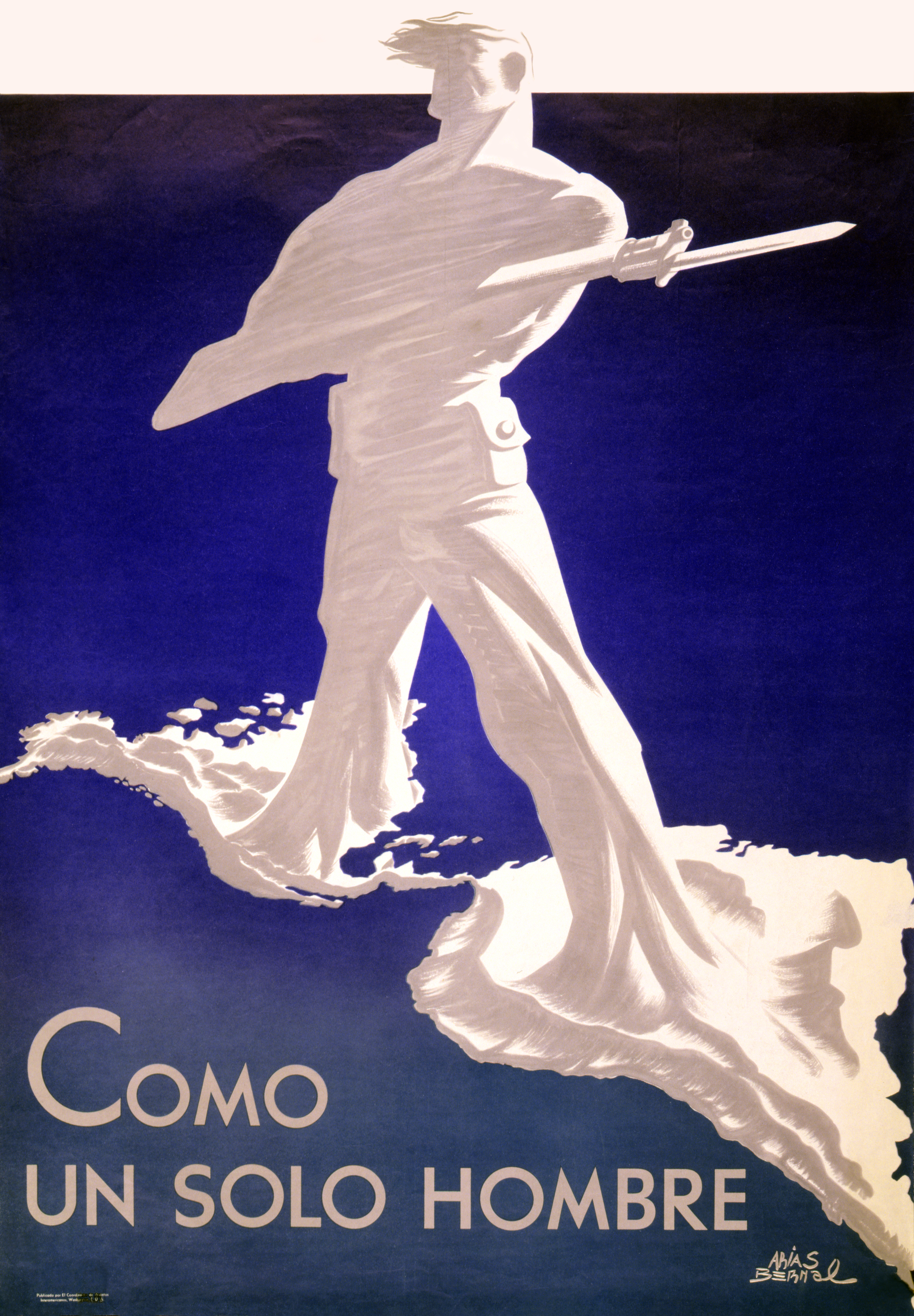
"As One Man" — OCIAA poster by Antonio Arias Bernal

In its early days, a particular concern of the OCIAA was the elimination of German influence in South America, and that of other Axis powers. Trade routes to Europe were disrupted following the fall of France in June 1940, presenting opportunities to both Germany and the U.S.

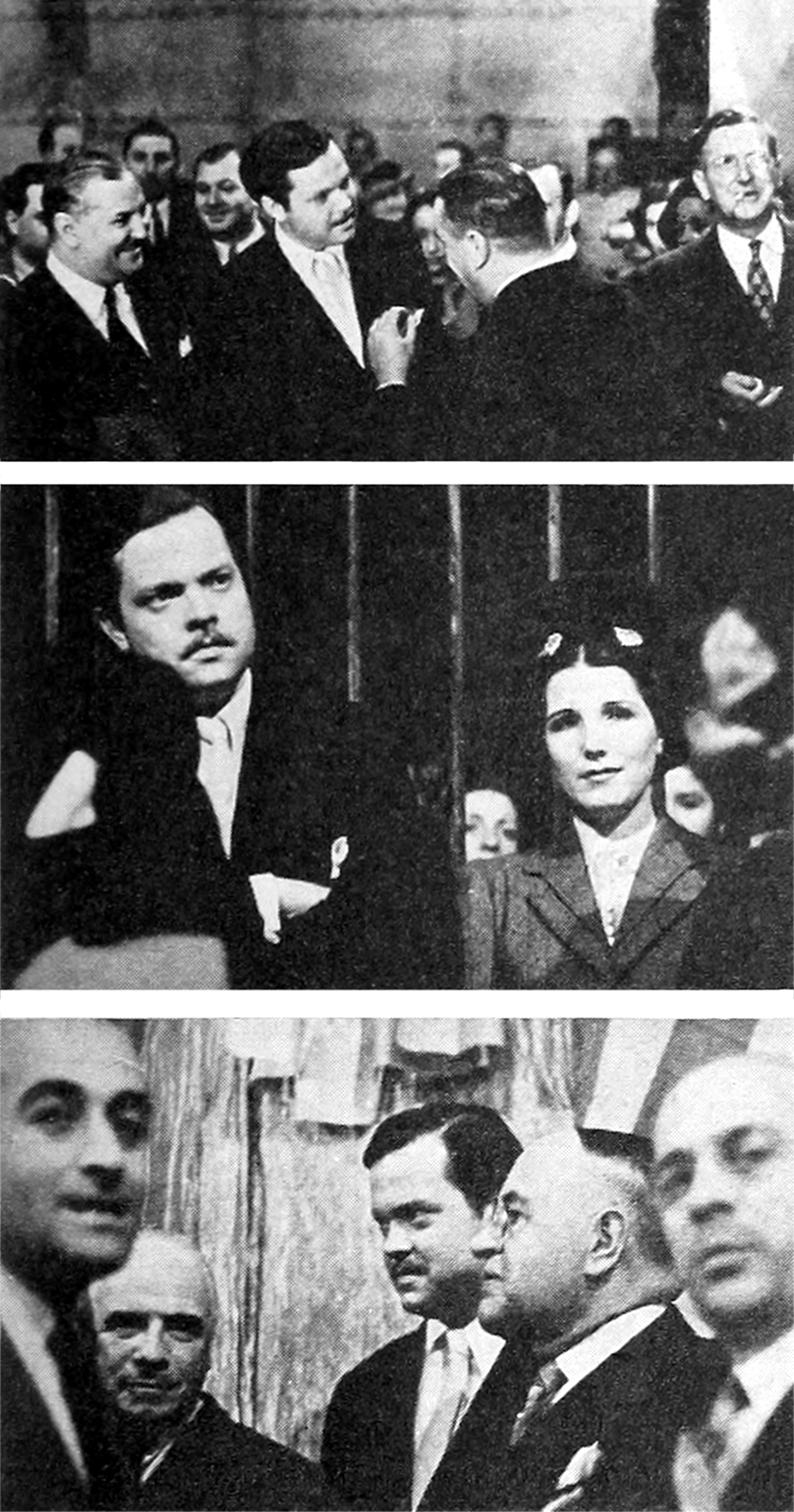
As a goodwill ambassador in 1942, Orson Welles toured the Estudios San Miguel in Buenos Aires, meeting with Argentine film personalities including (center photograph) actress Libertad Lamarque.

At the same time, many agents or affiliates of U.S. firms operating in Latin America were sympathetic to European Axis powers. The office encouraged a voluntary program of non-cooperation with companies and individuals perceived to be anti-American. To this end it cooperated secretly with British Security Co-ordination in New York. Though isolated in Europe, Britain maintained an extensive intelligence network in Latin America, and was happy to undermine Germany's trade efforts overseas by identifying sympathisers and agents. Through these efforts, U.S. exporters were encouraged to drop over a thousand accounts in South America during the first half of 1941.

The office was also concerned with public opinion in Latin America. It translated and disseminated relevant speeches by President Roosevelt, and distributed pro-U.S materials to features syndicates in the region. It carried out audience research surveys and encouraged radio broadcasters targeting these regions to improve the quality of their programming. In order to discourage opposing views it created a 'Proclaimed List', a black-list of newspapers and radio stations owned or influenced by Axis powers. Latin American firms wishing to do business with America were discouraged from dealing with these stations. Tax incentives were also used: spending by American firms on unprofitable longwave transmission to Latin America could be deducted from income tax payments. Likewise, spending on approved advertising in Latin America became deductible from corporate income taxes.

Walt Disney and a group of animators had been sent to South America in 1941 by the U.S. State Department as part of its Good Neighbor policy, and guaranteed financing for the resulting movie, Saludos Amigos (1942). In 1944, William Benton, publisher of the Encyclopædia Britannica, had entered into unsuccessful negotiations with Disney to make six to twelve educational films annually. Disney was asked to make an educational film about the Amazon basin and it resulted in the 1944 short, The Amazon Awakens.

== Postwar ==
External videos
- You may see OCIAA's documentary film Pan-American Bazar describing Macy's Latin-American Fair in 1942 Here

By an Executive order of August 31, 1945, the informational activities of the Office of Inter-American Affairs were transferred to the Department of State. It became known as the Office for Inter-American Affairs. By an Executive order of April 10, 1946, the Office was abolished and its remaining functions and responsibilities were transferred to the State Department.

== Personnel ==
- Nelson Rockefeller, Coordinator of the Office for Coordination of Commercial and Cultural Relations between the American Republics and Coordinator of Inter-American Affairs (1940–44):
- Wallace Harrison, Director of the Office for Inter-American Affairs (1945–46)

== Soviet penetration ==
The Office of the Coordinator of Inter-American Affairs was penetrated by Soviet intelligence during World War II. The agency's code name in Soviet intelligence and in the Venona project is "Cabaret". These American citizens were employees of the OCIAA and engaged in espionage on behalf of the Soviet Union:

- Marion Davis Berdecio
- Jack Fahy
- Joseph Gregg
- Helen Grace Scott Keenan
- Robert Talbott Miller
- Willard Park

== Collections ==
Brazil at War (1943)

The records of the Office of Inter-American Affairs are held at the US National Archives and Records Administration. The Rockefeller Archive Center holds papers relating to Nelson Rockefeller's time as Coordinator of the Office for Coordination of Commercial and Cultural Relations between the American Republics and Coordinator of Inter-American Affairs. University College London holds filmstrips made by the Office in its Educational Film Strips and Notes collection, part of the Institute of Education archives.

== See also ==
- Hello Americans
- The Sea Hound
- It's All True
- Viva América
- Gracias Amigos
