= 1993 Los Angeles Film Critics Association Awards =

Annual US film awards ceremony

19th LAFCA Awards
- Date: December 11, 1993

Highlights
- Best Picture: Schindler's List

The 19th Los Angeles Film Critics Association Awards, honoring the best in film for 1993, were given on 11 December 1993.

== Winners ==
- Best Picture:
  - Schindler's List
  - Runner-up: The Piano
- Best Director:
  - Jane Campion – The Piano
  - Runner-up: Robert Altman – Short Cuts
- Best Actor:
  - Anthony Hopkins – Shadowlands and The Remains of the Day
  - Runner-up: Daniel Day-Lewis – The Age of Innocence and In the Name of the Father
- Best Actress:
  - Holly Hunter – The Piano
  - Runner-up: Debra Winger – Shadowlands and A Dangerous Woman
- Best Supporting Actor:
  - Tommy Lee Jones – The Fugitive
  - Runner-up: Ralph Fiennes – Schindler's List
- Best Supporting Actress (tie):
  - Anna Paquin – The Piano
  - Rosie Perez – Fearless
- Best Screenplay:
  - Jane Campion – The Piano
  - Runner-up: Robert Altman and Frank Barhydt – Short Cuts
- Best Cinematography (tie):
  - Stuart Dryburgh – The Piano
  - Janusz Kamiński – Schindler's List
- Best Production Design:
  - Allan Starski - Schindler's List
  - Runner-up: Dante Ferretti – The Age of Innocence
- Best Music Score:
  - Zbigniew Preisner – Blue (Trois couleurs: Bleu), The Secret Garden and Olivier, Olivier
  - Runner-up: Michael Nyman – The Piano
- Best Foreign-Language Film:
  - Farewell My Concubine (Ba wang bie ji) • China/Hong Kong
  - Runner-up: Blue (Trois couleurs: Bleu) • France/Poland/Switzerland
- Best Non-Fiction Film:
  - It's All True: Based on an Unfinished Film by Orson Welles
- Best Animation:
  - The Mighty River (Le fleuve aux grandes eaux) (feature)
  - The Very Hungry Caterpillar & Other Stories (short)
- The Douglas Edwards Experimental/Independent Film/Video Award:
  - Peter Friedman and Tom Joslin – Silverlake Life: The View from Here
- New Generation Award:
  - Leonardo DiCaprio – This Boy's Life and What's Eating Gilbert Grape
- Career Achievement Award:
  - John Alton
