= 1993 National Society of Film Critics Awards =

Annual US film awards ceremony

28th NSFC Awards

January 3, 1994

Best Film:
Schindler's List

The 28th National Society of Film Critics Awards, given on 3 January 1994, honored the best filmmaking of 1993.

== Winners ==
=== Best Picture ===
1. Schindler's List
2. The Piano
3. Short Cuts

=== Best Director ===
1. Steven Spielberg – Schindler's List
2. Jane Campion – The Piano
3. Robert Altman – Short Cuts

=== Best Actor ===
1. David Thewlis – Naked
2. Daniel Day-Lewis – In the Name of the Father
2. Anthony Hopkins – The Remains of the Day and Shadowlands

=== Best Actress ===
1. Holly Hunter – The Piano
2. Ashley Judd – Ruby in Paradise
3. Stockard Channing – Six Degrees of Separation

=== Best Supporting Actor ===
1. Ralph Fiennes – Schindler's List
2. Leonardo DiCaprio – What's Eating Gilbert Grape and This Boy's Life
2. Tommy Lee Jones – The Fugitive

=== Best Supporting Actress ===
1. Madeleine Stowe – Short Cuts
2. Gwyneth Paltrow – Flesh and Bone
3. Jennifer Jason Leigh – Short Cuts
3. Anna Paquin – The Piano

=== Best Screenplay ===
1. Jane Campion – The Piano
2. John Guare – Six Degrees of Separation
3. Robert Altman and Frank Barhydt – Short Cuts

=== Best Cinematography ===
1. Janusz Kamiński – Schindler's List
2. Stuart Dryburgh – The Piano
3. Michael Ballhaus – The Age of Innocence

=== Best Foreign Language Film ===
1. The Story of Qiu Ju (Qiu Ju da guan si)
2. Blue (Trois couleurs: Bleu)
3. Farewell My Concubine (Ba wang bie ji)

=== Best Documentary ===
1. Visions of Light
2. It's All True: Based on an Unfinished Film by Orson Welles
3. The War Room

=== Experimental Film ===
- Rock Hudson's Home Movies

=== Special Citation ===
- The filmmakers of It's All True: Based on an Unfinished Film by Orson Welles
