= Richard Wilson (director) =

American film director

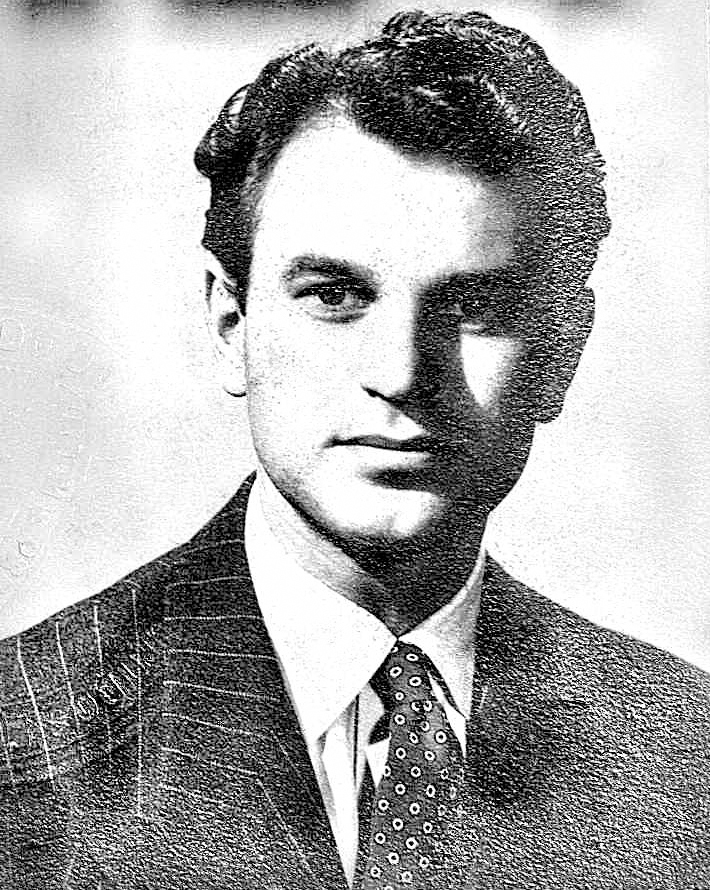
- Wilson in 1942
- Born: December 25, 1915; McKeesport, Pennsylvania, U.S.
- Died: August 21, 1991 (aged 75); Santa Monica, California, U.S.
- Education: University of Denver
- Occupations: Director, actor, writer, producer
- Years active: 1937–1991
- Spouse: Elizabeth Anderson Wilson

Richard Alan Wilson (December 25, 1915 – August 21, 1991) was an American director, actor, writer and producer closely associated with Orson Welles and the Mercury Theatre.

== Select filmography ==
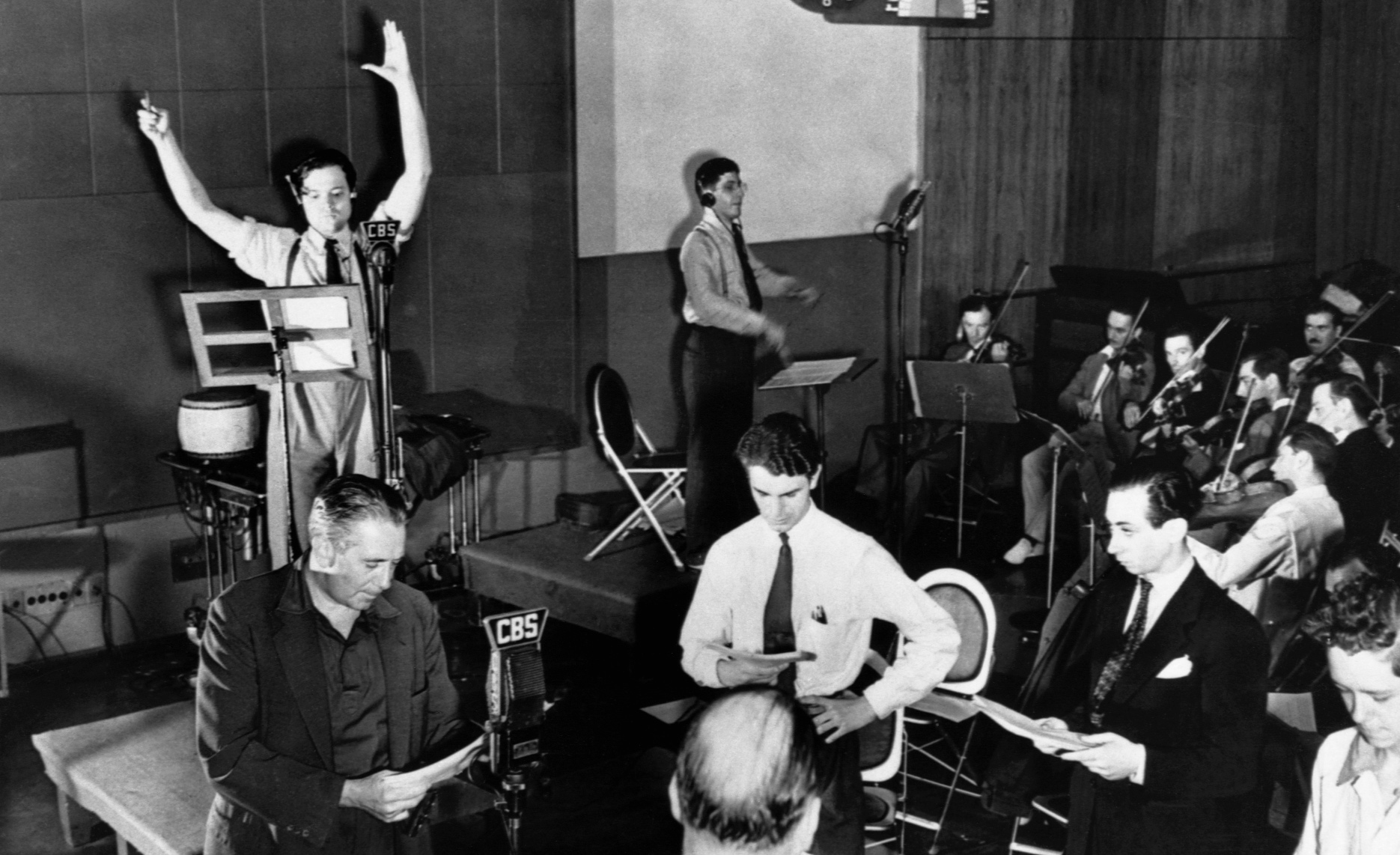
Wilson (center, in white shirt) at a rehearsal of The Mercury Theatre on the Air in 1938

- The Lady from Shanghai (1948) - associate producer
- Macbeth (1948) - associate producer
- Man with the Gun (1955) - director
- The Big Boodle (1957) - director
- Raw Wind in Eden (1958) - director
- Al Capone (1959) - director
- Pay or Die (1960) - director, producer
- Invitation to a Gunfighter (1964) - director, producer
- Three in the Attic (1968) - director, producer
- It's All True: Based on an Unfinished Film by Orson Welles (1993) - producer
