= Cabezas =

Cabezas may refer to:

== Surname ==
- Bryan Cabezas, Ecuadorian football player
- Carlos Cabezas, Spanish basketball player
- David Cabezas, Ecuadorian footballer
- Luis Carlos Cabezas, Colombian footballer
- Omar Cabezas, Nicaraguan author, revolutionary and politician
- Salvador Cabezas, retired Salvadorean footballer
- José Luis Cabezas, Argentine news photographer and reporter

== Places ==
Bolivia

- Cabezas (Cordillera), a town in Santa Cruz Department

Cuba

- Cabezas (Unión de Reyes), a village in Matanzas Province

Nicaragua

- Puerto Cabezas, a town in the North Caribbean Coast Region

Spain

- Cabezas de Alambre, a municipality in the province of Ávila, Castile and León
- Cabezas del Pozo, a municipality in the province of Ávila, Castile and León
- Cabezas del Villar, a municipality in the province of Ávila, Castile and León
- Cabezas Rubias, a municipality in the province of Huelva, Andalusia
- Escarabajosa de Cabezas, a municipality in the province of Segovia, Castile and León
- Las Cabezas de San Juan, a municipality in the province of Seville, Andalusia
- Sauquillo de Cabezas, a municipality in the province of Segovia, Castile and León

United States

- Dos Cabezas, Arizona, an unincorporated community of Cochise County, Arizona
- Dos Cabezas Mountains, a mountain range of Arizona

== See also ==
- Cabeza (disambiguation)
