= Isaac Oviedo =

Cuban tres player, singer and songwriter (1902–1992)

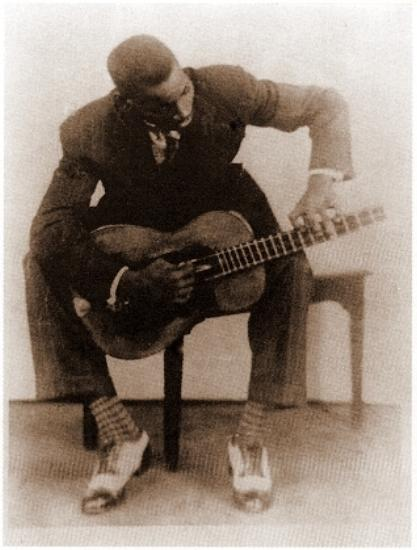
- Oviedo playing the tres, c. 1930.

Background information
- Born: July 6, 1902; Sabanilla del Encomendador, Unión de Reyes, Matanzas, Cuba
- Died: June 26, 1992 (aged 89) Havana, Cuba
- Genres: Son cubano, trova, guaracha, afro-son, bolero
- Occupations: Musician, bandleader, songwriter
- Instruments: Tres, guitar, laúd, vocals
- Years active: c. 1920–1992
- Labels: Victor, Brunswick, Areito, Rounder

Isaac Oviedo (July 6, 1902 – June 16, 1992) was a Cuban tres player, singer and songwriter. He was the founder and leader of the Septeto Matancero for over 50 years, and the author of many famous sones such as "Engancha carretero". Throughout his long career Oviedo only recorded a handful of sessions, mostly for American record labels. He has been called "one of the greatest Cuban tres players" by other musicians such as Efraín Ríos and Pancho Amat. According to the latter, Oviedo was the pioneering and most influential tresero of the septeto format (the major type of son ensemble of the 1920s and '30s). His technical innovations include the alzapúa thumb stroke and the use of the pinky finger.

His son Ernesto played in his band since the 1940s and became a successful bolero singer, while his other son Gilberto, known as Papi Oviedo, has also had a long career as a tresero, playing with Conjunto Chappottín, Estrellas de Chocolate and Orquesta Revé.

== Life and career ==
Isaac Oviedo was born on July 6, 1902, in the village of Sabanilla del Encomendador (now known as Juan Gualberto Gómez) in the municipality of Unión de Reyes, Matanzas, Cuba. His family was poor and his mother worked as a sugarcane cutter. From an early age he taught himself to play the guitar. At age 11 he learned to play the tres from a musician from Santiago de Cuba who had relocated to Matanzas after the War of Independence. By his late teens he was playing in Pepito López's orchestra, and also formed his own band, Los Unionenses. He played at the Sauto Theater, and in 1922 founded the Sexteto Matancero alongside guitarist Julio Govín. He then took his group to Havana in 1926, as many other rural artists were doing at the time. Between 1926 and 1928 he played at various bars and cabarets in Marianao, the most touristic seaside neighbourhood of Havana. In this period Graciano Gómez joined the band on guitar and Barbarito Díez became the lead singer. With them, the Sexteto Matancero held its first recording sessions on February 7, 1928, for Victor. They recorded "Engancha carretero", Oviedo's most successful and critically acclaimed song, noted for its creole character.

In 1929, Oviedo toured Puerto Rico with Gómez co-directing the Quinteto Típico Gómez-Oviedo. During their stay, Oviedo taught Guillermo "Piliche" Ayala how to play the tres, thus becoming the first Puerto Rican tres player. Back in Havana the Sexteto Matancero became a septeto with the addition of cornettist Serafín Terry and recorded four songs in June 1930 for Brunswick. Oviedo, Gómez and Díez continued playing together with a varying lineup (cuarteto, quinteto, sexteto, etc.). The Quinteto Típico became the Quinteto Selecto, and in 1941 they recorded a single for Victor as Cuarteto Selecto. The association between Oviedo and Gómez under various names (Matancero, Típico, Selecto) lasted until the early 1970s, when Gómez retired. Oviedo continued to perform, recording an album for Areito in 1984. Between 1962 and 1968, Oviedo performed with Los Tutankamén, a live band organized by Alfredo González Suazo "Sirique" at his peña.

Now I'm 82 years old. I've been retired for 5 years, but I can't live without music. I have to continue playing.

— Isaac Oviedo, 1984.

Despite his lasting impact in the music of Cuba, and to a lesser extent Puerto Rico, Oviedo remained virtually unknown to international audiences until 1989, when he was featured in the Latin music documentary Routes of Rhythm, presented by Harry Belafonte, which explored the historical development of some Afro-Cuban musical traditions. The documentary, filmed in 1984, was broadcast by PBS and accompanied by the release of three CDs. While Oviedo appears only in one track on each of the first two volumes (released in 1990), the final volume (released in 1992) consists entirely of his music. The "rediscovery" of Oviedo's music was however followed by his death on June 16, 1992, aged 89. The documentary was released on DVD in 2001 under the title Roots of Rhythm.

== Style and technique ==
Oviedo is considered one of the earliest innovators of the tres, developing a series of techniques that increased the timbral and melodic possibilities of the instrument. Most importantly, he pioneered the thumb stroke known as alzapúa (a technique already used by mandolinists and nowadays common in flamenco), as well as the use of the pinky finger. Although sometimes described as "traditionalist" in comparison to treseros from later decades, Oviedo is considered the first virtuoso of the tres due to his varied and complex style, which was imitated by many. Oviedo's preferred tuning was that of a D-major chord, A–D–F#, the same that Arsenio Rodríguez would use years later.

== Discography ==
Studio albums

- Isaac Oviedo y los Timberos del Caribe (Areito, 1984)
- Routes of Rhythm Vol. 3 (Rounder, 1992)
