= Lilí Martínez =

Cuban musical artist (1915-1990)

- Birth name: Luis Martínez Griñán
- Also known as: La Perla de Oriente (Note: Literally The Pearl of the East; this nickname was given to him by famous bandleader Antonio Arcaño.)
- Born: 19 August 1915; Guantánamo, Cuba
- Died: 26 August 1990 (aged 75); Havana, Cuba
- Genres: Son cubano, guaracha, bolero
- Occupation(s): Musician, composer, arranger
- Instrument: Piano
- Years active: 1934-67, 1983
- Labels: RCA Victor, Panart, Puchito, Suave, EGREM

Luis Martínez Griñán (19 August 1915 – 26 August 1990), better known as Lilí Martínez, was a Cuban pianist, arranger and composer specializing in the son montuno style. He played in the Conjunto de Arsenio Rodríguez and Conjunto Chappottín. Together with Rubén González and Peruchín, he is said to have "forged the style of modem Cuban piano playing in the 1940s".

== Life and career ==
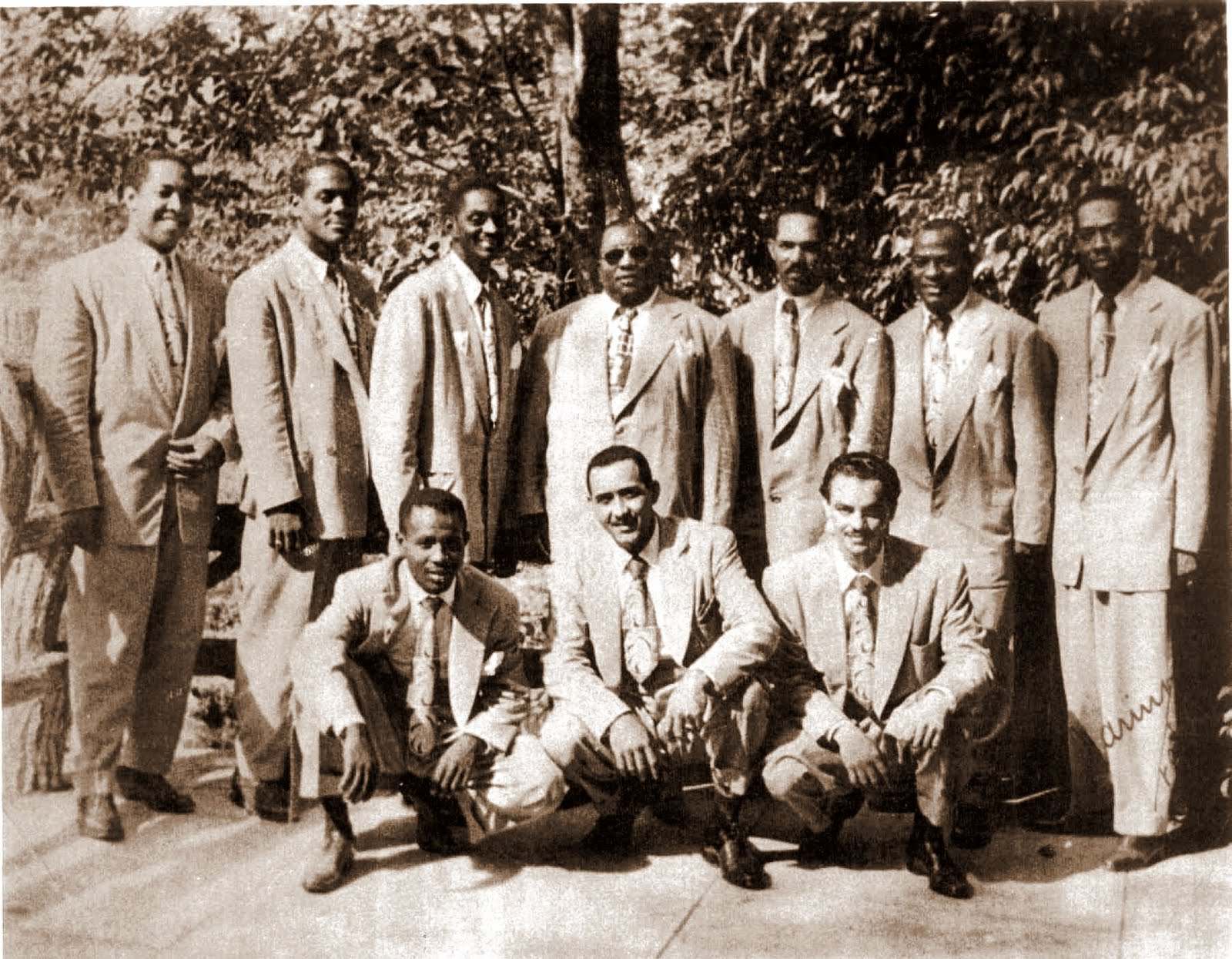
Conjunto de Arsenio Rodríguez ca. 1949. Martínez is the first from the right, crouching.

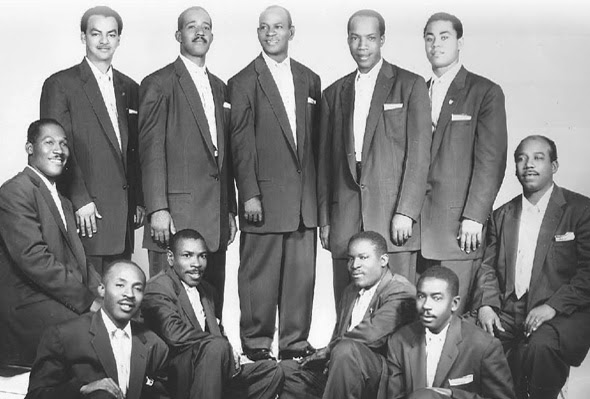
Conjunto Chappottín in the 1950s. Martínez is the first from the left, standing.

Martínez was born to a Cuban mother and a Spanish father in Guantánamo on 18 August 1915. (Note: Some sources incorrectly list 16 February 1917 as his birth date.) He started playing music in local bands at age 17. In 1937 he formed his own band, Los Champions de Lilí Martínez, which worked for the CMKS radio. In 1943 he founded La Rareza del 43. He joined Arsenio Rodríguez's conjunto in 1945 after the departure of Rubén González. In 1950, after Rodríguez decided to continue his career in New York, the members of his conjunto that remained in Havana formed Conjunto Chappottín, with Félix Chappottín as leader and trumpeter, Lilí Martínez as pianist and arranger, and Miguelito Cuní as lead vocalist.

Martínez left Conjunto Chappotín in 1958. He then worked as an arranger for Luis Griñán (no relation), whose two albums are often miscredited to Martínez, who never recorded an LP as a leader. In 1960, he married Coralia Camiño. In the early 1960s, he played with the conjunto Estrellas de Chocolate founded by Félix "Chocolate" Alfonso. He then directed a band called Los Diablos Rojos in Holguín before officially retiring in 1967. In 1983, he gave an improvised concert together with Chucho Valdés and Frank Fernández at the ICAIC. The three pianists played together to a pre-recorded backing track featuring Niño Rivera on tres, Orlando "Cachaíto" López on bass and Enrique Pla on drums; this performance is the only film documenting Martínez's playing. He died on 26 August 1990 in Havana and his remains were transferred to Guantánamo in 1995. (Note: Some sources incorrectly list 17 September 1990 as his death date.)

== Style ==
Martínez's compositions and arrangements are firmly established in the son oriental traditions from the region where he grew up. In particular, he frequently incorporated patterns from nengón, a precursor to the son, in his compositions, influenced by tresero Chito Latamblé who played with him for years. Other traditional genres that influenced his music are changüí, kiribá and regina.

Despite being rooted in son traditions, Martínez's compositions also incorporated classical and jazz influences, giving rise a very innovative approach. He was one of the first Cuban pianists to master solo improvisations based on guajeos, also known as tumbaos.

== Legacy ==
Martínez is widely considered one of the most influential pianists from Cuba, despite attaining little fame outside the country. He has been called "the greatest sonero pianist" by Chucho Valdés, and also cited as an influence by salsa pianists such as Papo Lucca, Larry Harlow and Eddie Palmieri.

In 1994, Raúl Planas and Radio Progreso announcer Eduardo Rosillo approached retired pianist Rubén González with the idea of recording new versions of ten songs composed by Martínez. The resulting album, Son inconcluso, featured a full band including bassist Orlando "Cachaíto" López and tresero Arturo "Alambre Dulce" Harvey (ex-Conjunto Chappottín), among others, and was released in 1999 by EGREM.

In 2002, Manolito Simonet, the leader of the popular timba group Manolito y su Trabuco, organized a series of recordings to honour the work of Lilí Martínez. Among the artists that recorded Martínez's compositions as part of the project were Pedro Lugo "El Nene", Mayito Rivera, Issac Delgado and Paulito FG. The resulting album, titled Esto sí se llama querer, was released through Cuban label Unicornio in 2002, receiving favourable reviews.

== Discography ==
With Conjunto Chappottín

- 1957: Alto Songo (Panart)
- 1957: Chappottín (Puchito)
- 1958: Chappottín y sus Estrellas (Puchito)
- 1958: Musicalidad en sepia (Maype)

With Miguelito Cuní

- 1958: Sones del ayer (Gema)
