= Chito Latamblé =

- Birth name: Reyes Latamblet Veranes
- Born: June 27, 1916 Guantánamo, Cuba
- Died: March 6, 1993 (aged 76) Guantánamo, Cuba
- Genres: Changüí, nengón, son cubano
- Occupation: Musician
- Instrument: Tres
- Years active: 1934-1987
- Formerly of: Jóvenes del Guaso, Grupo Changüí de Guantánamo

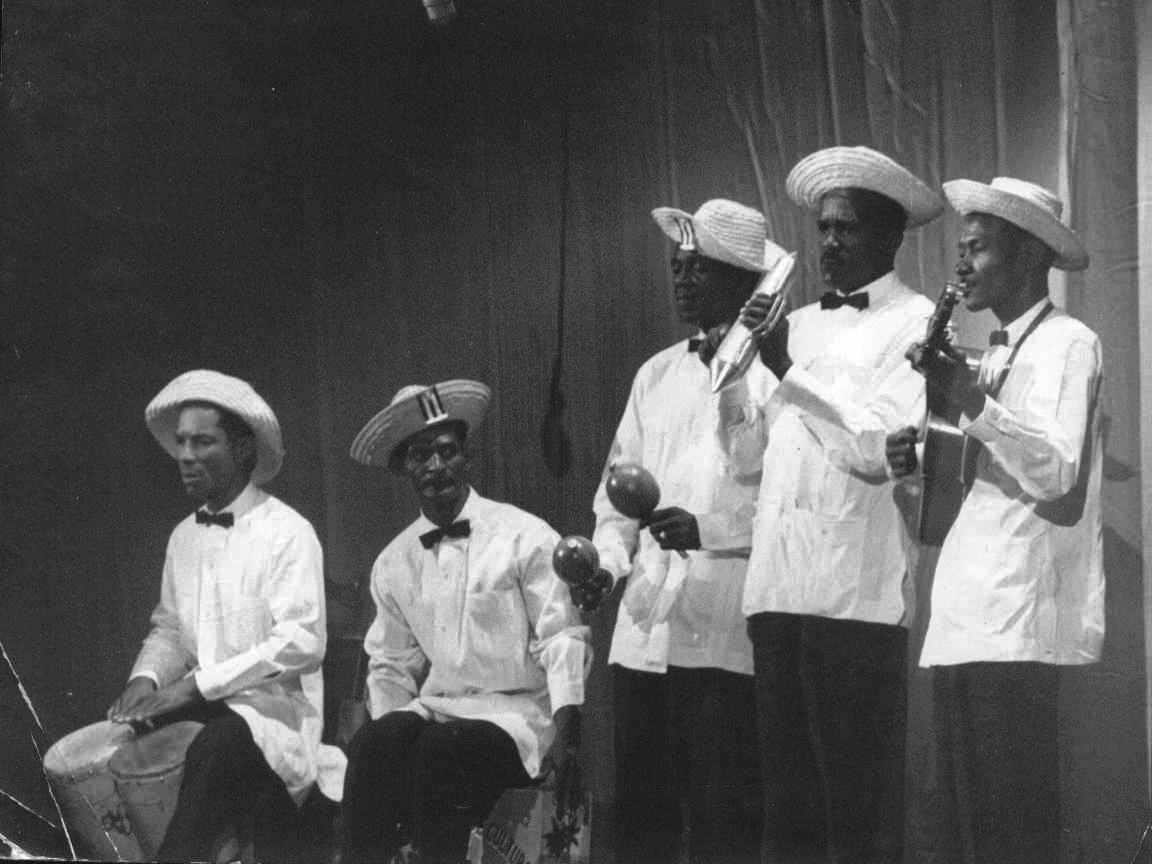
Chito Latamblé (right) playing with the Grupo Changüí de Guantánamo at the National Folk Festival in Havana, 1962.

Reyes Latamblet Veranes (June 27, 1916 – March 6, 1993), better known as Chito Latamblé, was a Cuban tres player who specialized in the changüí genre of eastern Cuba. He is considered one of the most influential treseros, as well as a key exponent and promoter of the changüí in Cuba. From 1945, Latamblé co-directed with his brother the Grupo Changüí de Guantánamo, which featured the most "historically important" exponents of the genre.

== Life and career ==
Latamblé was born on June 27, 1916, in the Loma del Chivo neighbourhood of Guantánamo, Cuba, to Marcelino Latamblet y Mariana Veranes. He learned tres from his father and became a very active player from a very young age, despite his mother's wishes that he pursue a different career. Although he would work as a house painter and turbine oiler, he devoted his life to changüí, a music style that preceded the son cubano.

During his youth he played at parties and in estudiantinas (student groups) and children's groups. Together with his brother Arturo (who played the bongos), he formed Los Jóvenes del Guaso in 1934. He also played with Rafael Inciarte Brioso's Orquesta Cristal and in Conchita Bravo's ensemble. In 1937 he joined Lilí Martínez's group, Los Champions de Lilí Martínez, which played for the CMKH and CMKS radio stations. After the departure of Martínez the band renamed itself Los Siete Amigos (The Seven Friends). Latamblé then joined trova ensemble La Trova Tradicional de Guantánamo, Orquesta Siboney, and was hired by Martínez again, this time in his band La Rareza del 43. Latamblé had a significant influence in Martínez's piano style; Martínez transcribed Latamblé's playing, thus incorporating the nengón and changüí into contemporary son piano playing.

In 1945 Rafael Inciarte requested that Latamblé and his brother form an ensemble devoted entirely to the changüí. The resulting band was Grupo Changüí de Guantánamo. It would become one of Cuba's most popular traditional ensembles and by far the most successful changüí group in the country. Latamblé would also play in other groups such as Conjunto Sorpresa, which he joined in 1952. In 1983, popular tresero Pancho Amat visited Latamblé to learn his changüí techniques. Although it became an urban legend that Amat was unable to learn his style, he did subsequently incorporate changüí-like playing in his performances.

After retiring in 1987 due to poor health, Latamblé died on March 6, 1993, in his hometown of Guantánamo. His legacy survives in the tres playing of Carmelo Irve Suterán, his substitute in Grupo Changüí de Guantánamo. In 2007, a museum dedicated to Latamblé called Casa del Changüí (House of Changüí) was established in Guantánamo.

== Awards and honors ==
Latamblé received numerous awards from the Cuban government throughout his lifetime.

- Orden por la Cultura Cubana (Cuban Culture Order)
- Distinción por la Cultura Nacional (National Culture Distinction)
- Medalla Raúl Gómez García (Raúl Gómez García Medal)
