= Pedro Lugo (disambiguation) =

Pedro Lugo may refer to:

- Pedro Lugo "El Nene" (b. 1960), Cuban singer
- Pedro Lugo (athlete), Mexican runner at the 1930 Central American and Caribbean Games
- Pedro Fernández de Lugo (1475–1536), Spanish nobleman
