= Morena Son =

Morena Son are a Cuban son septeto from Santiago de Cuba, Cuba. They have toured South America and Europe (Italy, England, Germany, Switzerland, Spain and France).

== Members ==
- Aimeé Campos – tres
- Aylen Guevara – vocals
- María Mercedes Soto – percussion, vocals
- Juana Filiú – bass
- Niurka Cardona – vocals, maracas
- Orialis Luna – guitar
- Deisy Estrada – bongos
