= Griñán =

Griñán is a surname. Notable people with the surname include:

- José Antonio Griñán (born 1946), Spanish politician
- Luis Griñán (d. 1961), Cuban independent bandleader, pianist, guitarist, and record producer
- Reynier Casamayor Griñán (born c. 1975), Cuban musician and medical doctor
