= Nelson González =

Nelson González may refer to:

- Nelson González (footballer)
- Nelson González (musician)
