= Papi Oviedo =

Cuban musician (1938–2017)

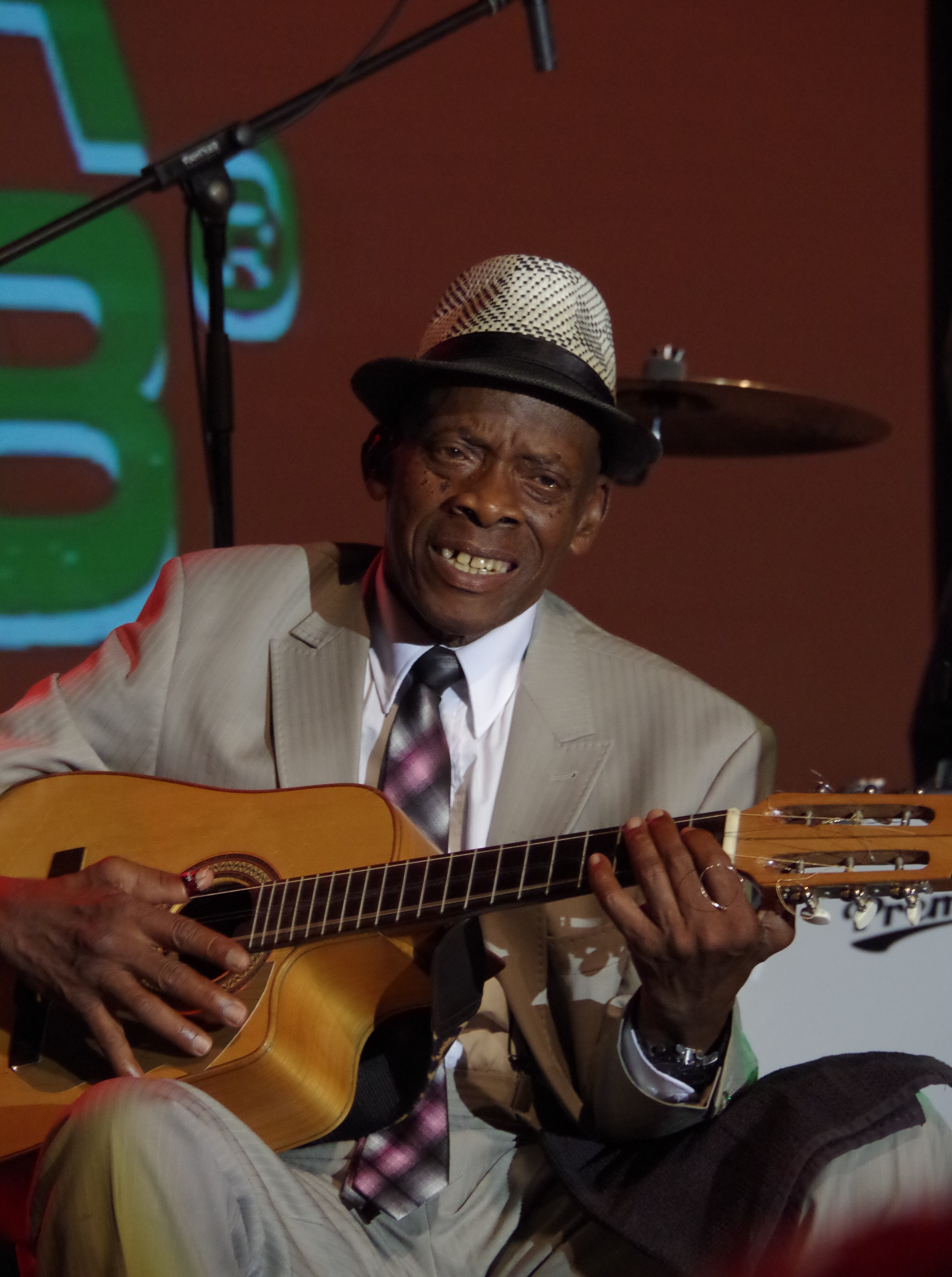
- Papi Oviedo (2015)

Background information
- Born: Gilberto Oviedo la Portilla; February 9, 1938; La Habana, Cuba
- Died: October 31, 2017 (aged 79)
- Genres: Son
- Occupation: Musician
- Instrument: Tres
- Years active: 1952–2017
- Labels: EGREM; Tumi; World Circuit

Gilberto Oviedo la Portilla (9 February 1938 – 31 October 2017), better known as Papi Oviedo, was a Cuban tres player.

== Early life ==
Papi Oviedo was born Gilberto Oviedo La Portilla in 1938, son of tres player Isaac Oviedo (1902–1992). Papi Oviedo began playing tres in 1952 and worked his way up through local bands to be the primary tres player for singer Orlando Contreras. Between 1957 and 1969, he was the featured tresero for Conjunto Tipico Habanero, Conjunto Chappottín and Estrellas de Chocolate. Between 1980 and 1995, he teamed up with Elio Revé in a re-formed version of charanga outfit Orquesta Revé. In 1995, Papi left Orquesta Revé to record his debut solo album, Encuentro entre soneros (1997, Tumi Music). In 2001, he released Bana Congo, a collaborative album with Congolese guitarist Papa Noël.

== Discography ==
As a leader

- 1997: Encuentro entre soneros (Tumi)
- 2001: Bana Congo (Tumi) – with Papa Noël

With Jane Bunnett

- 2002: Cuban Odyssey (Blue Note)

With Rubén González

- 2000: Chanchullo (World Circuit)

With Isaac Oviedo

- 1992: Routes of Rhythm Vol. 3 (Rounder)
