= Nelson González (musician) =

Puerto Rican musician

- Born: May 30, 1948 (age 78); Vega Baja, Puerto Rico
- Genres: Salsa, son cubano
- Occupations: Musician, arranger, music director, producer
- Instrument: Tres
- Years active: 1971–present
- Labels: Fania, TR, Dissar, Qbadisc

Nelson González (born May 30, 1948) is a Puerto Rican tres player. He specialises in the Cuban tres, and only occasionally plays the Puerto Rican tres (similar to the cuatro). He is a prolific session musician and has been a member of renowned salsa ensembles such as Fania All-Stars, Orchestra Harlow and Típica 73. He has authored a book on the tres guitar method published by Mel Bay. Together with Pancho Amat and Papi Oviedo he is considered one of the most influential modern tres players.

== Career ==
Nelson González was born on May 30, 1948, in Vega Baja, Puerto Rico. In 1960, his family moved to Brooklyn. He became part of the Nuyorican music scene of the 1970s, making his debut recording in 1971 (Los Dinámicos). He then recorded with Orquesta Harlow, Típica Ideal and Grupo Folklórico y Experimental Nuevayorquino. He was a member of Típica 73 for four years before co-founding Los Kimbos in 1976 with other ex-members of Típica 73 (Adalberto Santiago, Orestes Vilató and Joe Mannozzi). The same year he recorded two albums with Carlos "Patato" Valdés in which he also acted as musical director and mixing engineer. In 1977 he performed in Cachao's comeback album Dos.

In 1978 Los Kimbos split into two bands, The Nelson González Group and Los Nuevos Kimbos de Orestes Vilató, while Adalberto Santiago started his solo career. In 1979 he played in Fania All-Stars' famous Habana Jam. In 1984 he launched a new project, Orquesta Revelación, with Joe Mannozzi, Papo Lucca and Louis García. In 1997 he released his first solo album, Son mundano. His second solo album, Pa' los treseros, was released in 2001, and was nominated for the 2002 Latin Grammy Award for Best Traditional Tropical Album.

== Awards and honors ==
- Best Salsa Band in Latin America (Típica 73; 1976)
- Latin New York Magazine's Best Tres Player of the Year (1978, 1979)
- Performed in 5 Grammy Award winning albums:
  - Mi tierra (Gloria Estefan; 1993)
  - Master Sessions Vol I (Cachao; 1994)
  - Master Sessions Vol II (Cachao; 1995)
  - Alma Caribeña (Gloria Estefan; 2000)
  - Masterpiece (Tito Puente & Eddie Palmieri; 2000)
