= Sexteto Habanero =

Cuban son ensemble

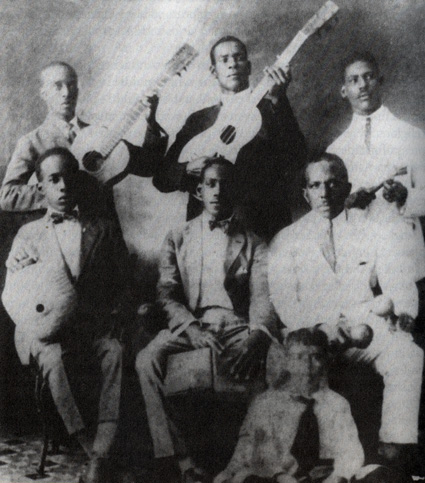
- First known photo of the Sexteto Habanero, 1920. From left to right, back: Guillermo Castillo, Carlos Godínez and Gerardo Martínez; front: Antonio Bacallao, Óscar Sotolongo and Felipe Neri Cabrera.

Background information
- Origin: Havana, Cuba
- Genres: Son cubano
- Years active: 1920–present
- Labels: Victor, Corazón, Lusafrica, Colibrí
- Members: Felipe Ferrer; Juan A. Jústiz; José Antonio Pérez; Emilio Moret; Ernesto Laza; Ibrahim Aties; Digno Marcelino Pérez; Gilberto Azcuy; Jaime Gracián
- Past members: Guillermo Castillo; Carlos Godínez; Gerardo Martínez; Antonio Bacallao; Óscar Sotolongo; Felipe Neri Cabrera; Abelardo Barroso; Rafael Hernández "El Picher"; Agustín Gutiérrez; José Manuel Carriera "El Chino" Incharte; Enrique Hernández; Félix Chappottín; Andrés Sotolongo; José Interián; Manolo Furé; Germán Pedro Ibáñez; Bárbaro Teuntor García; Faustino Sánchez Illa; Aristides Núñez de Villavicencio; Ricardo Ferro Vicente; Servando Arango "El Chino"

The Sexteto Habanero was a Cuban son sextet founded in 1920 in Havana. It played an important part in the early history of the genre, contributing to its popularization all around Cuba. In 1927, the band incorporated a cornet player becoming the Septeto Habanero. Although most original members left in the 1930s, the band has continued to perform and record with different line-ups. Their last album was released in 2010 for their 90th anniversary.

== History ==
=== Origins ===
In 1916, tres player and director Ricardo Martínez from Santiago de Cuba founded the Cuarteto Oriental together with Guillermo Castillo (botija), Gerardo Martínez (lead vocals and claves) and Felipe Neri Cabrera (maracas). In 1917, they left Oriente to record four tracks for Columbia Records in Havana. The songs are listed in a Columbia catalog for 1921, but are probably lost. However, the same group expanded to a sextet in 1918, with Castillo now on guitar, Antonio Bacallao on botija and Óscar Sotolongo on bongos. They renamed themselves Sexteto Típico Oriental. Meanwhile, members of the Victor record label decided to make son recordings at the Hotel Inglaterra in Havana, hiring musician Carlos Godínez to organize a band. Only two of the six recordings they made ("Mujer bandolera" and "Rosa, qué linda eres") have been issued on CD. Credited to Sexteto Habanero Godínez, these are the oldest known recordings in the sexteto format. According to Díaz Ayala, the band in these recordings featured Carlos Godínez (tres and director), María Teresa Vera (lead vocals and claves), Manuel Corona (guitar and second vocals), "Sinsonte" (third vocals and maracas), Alfredo Boloña (bongos) and a sixth musician, possibly Rafael Zequeira. In 1919, the discrepancies within the Sexteto Típico Oriental led to the departure of Ricardo Martínez, who was then replaced by Godínez. In 1920, the band renamed itself Sexteto Habanero.

Thus, the founding members of the Sexteto Habanero were Guillermo Castillo (guitar and director), Carlos Godínez (tres), Gerardo Martínez (lead vocals and claves), Antonio Bacallao (botija), Óscar Sotolongo (square bongó) and Felipe Neri Cabrera (maracas). The instrumental set-up is interesting, because they use some of the original instruments of the son, including the botija and a unique "square bongó".

=== 1925 to 1931 ===
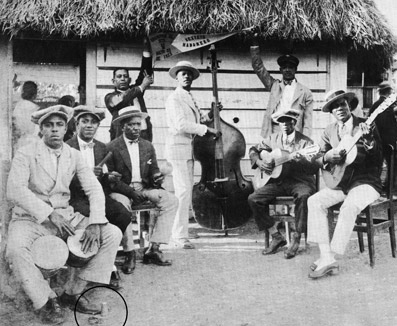
Sexteto Habanero in 1925. From left to right: Agustín Gutiérrez, Abelardo Barroso, Felipe Neri Cabrera, Gerardo Martínez, Guillermo Castillo, Carlos Godínez. The bongosero's tuning lamp is circled.

The main set of recordings by the Sexteto Habanero were made between 1925 and 1931. The line-up in these recordings was modernized with respect to the original sextet, as the group appreciated that the double bass was a musically more suitable instrument than the botijuela, which was abandoned by them and most other son groups. By 1925 the band's line-up featured Gerardo Martínez as the new leader, also singing and playing double bass; Guillermo Castillo on guitar and vocals; Felipe Neri Cabrera on maracas and vocals; and two new members: Agustín Gutiérrez on bongó (replaced Sotolongo in 1923 and left in 1928), and Abelardo Barroso as lead vocalist and maraquero, both of whom would also play with the Habanero's rival band, Septeto Nacional. Rafael Hernández "El Picher" often replaced Barroso on lead vocals and maracas, while José Manuel Carriera Incharte "El Chino" (bongosero in the Nacional) possibly played instead of Agustín Gutiérrez in some sessions.

The group's recordings in the 1925 to 1931 era were made in New York City and originally released as 78 rpm singles, now available on LP and CD. The music is of high quality, considering the technical limitations of the time. The group won first prize in the Concurso de Sones in 1925 and 1926. On March 21, 1927, Enrique Hernández joined the Habanero on cornet, turning the sexteto into a septeto. Hernández was replaced by trumpeter Félix Chappottín in February 1928. Chappottín would remain with the band until 1930, when he was replaced by José Interián. The Habanero was one of the first septetos, preceded only by the Septeto Apolo (featuring pianist Orestes López) and Septeto Orquídea (featuring Chappottín). In October 1929, a performance of the Septeto was filmed in Ybor City, Florida, for the movie Hell Harbor. This footage, which features Óscar Sotolongo's son, Andrés Sotolongo, on bongos, ranks among the earliest pieces of film documenting son cubano.

=== Septeto Habanero and Conjunto Típico Habanero ===
Although de facto a septet since 1927, the band didn't release music as the Septeto Habanero until 1945. Due to the advent of conjuntos and big bands, the band remained largely inactive between 1931 and 1945, making recordings only in a session on September 17, 1940. In the early 1930s the band experienced important line-up changes, with Guillermo Castillo and Carlos Godínez leaving in 1934. The following year, director Gerardo Martínez left the band to form a new group, Conjunto Típico Habanero. Throughout the 1940s, the Conjunto Típico Habanero would remain linked to the Septeto Habanero, as Martínez made recordings with the Septeto in the mid 1940s (there were sessions in 1945, 1946 and 1948). After the death of Martínez in 1958, the Septeto Habanero incorporated a tumbadora, güiro and another trumpet under the direction of Manolo Furé (in the band since 1952), changing its name to Conjunto Típico Habanero.

=== Re-formation ===
In 1983, the Conjunto Típico Habanero reverted its name definitively to Septeto Habanero, still with Manolo Furé as lead singer and claves player. In 1995, the band recorded an album for its 75th anniversary entitled 75 Años después. The band was actually as octet (and remains so), featuring Manolo Furé (lead vocals, claves), Germán Pedro Ibáñez (guitar), José Antonio Pérez (vocals and maracas), Digno Marcelino Pérez (vocals and güiro), Felipe Ferrer (tres), Bárbaro Teuntor García (trumpet), Faustino Sánchez Illa (electric bass) and Ricardo Ferro Vicente (bongos). The latter replaced long-term bongosero Arístides Núñes de Villavicencio.

After the death of Furé, guitarist and singer Germán Pedro "Pedrito" Ibáñez, who joined the band in 1962, became the director until his death in 2007. In November 1997, the band recorded Orgullo de los soneros, an album released by Lusafrica in 1998. The line-up in these recordings featured Germán Pedro Ibáñez (guitar and director), José Antonio Pérez (vocals and claves), Emilio Moret (vocals and güiro), Digno Marcelino Pérez (vocals and maracas), Felipe Ferrer (tres), Servando Arango (trumpet), Faustino Sánchez Illa (double bass) and Ricardo Ferro Vincente (bongos). Their second album on Lusafrica, Celebrando sus 80 años, was released in March 2000 for the band's 80th anniversary with the same line-up.

In 2010, their 90th anniversary album 90 años: Orgullo de los soneros was nominated for the Latin Grammy Award for Best Traditional Tropical Album. The album was recorded between February and March 2009 with the following line-up: Felipe Ferrer (tres and director), Juan A. Jústiz (vocals and güiro), José Antonio Pérez (vocals), Emilio Moret (vocals and maracas), Ernesto Laza (bongó and bell), Ibrahim Aties (baby bass), Digno Marcelino Pérez (vocals and claves), Gilberto Azcuy (trumpet) and Jaime Gracián (manager). The album was dedicated to Pedrito Ibáñez and Servando Arango "El Chino", who had recently died.

Their 100th anniversary album, 100 años del Septeto Habanero, released in two volumes by Colibrí, won the Lifetime Achievement Award at the 2021 Cubadisco Awards.

== Discography ==
=== Studio albums ===
- 1968: Típico y Habanero (LP, Areito)
- 1995: 75 Años después (CD, Corazón)
- 1998: Orgullo de los soneros (CD, Lusafrica)
- 2000: Celebrando sus 80 años (CD, Lusafrica)
- 2010: 90 años: Orgullo de los soneros (CD, Colibrí)
- 2020: 100 años del Septeto Habanero (CD, Colibrí)

=== Compilations ===
- 1990: La historia de son cubano: The Roots of Salsa, Volume II (LP, Folklyric): 16 recordings 1926–1931.
- 1991: Sexteto Habanero (CD, Tumbao Cuban Classics): 14 recordings 1924–1927.
- 1992: Las raíces del son (CD, Tumbao Cuban Classics): 24 recordings 1925–1931.
- 1999: Grabaciones completas (CD, Tumbao Cuban Classics): 98 recordings 1925–1931.

== See also ==
- Early Cuban bands
- Septeto Nacional
