= Cabeza (disambiguation) =

Cabeza is a Spanish and Galician word meaning 'head'.

Cabeza may also refer to:

- Cabeza (wasp), genus of wasps in the family Eulophidae

== Persons ==
- Richard Cabeza, Swedish musician
- Álvar Núñez Cabeza de Vaca, Spanish explorer of the New World

== Arts, entertainment, and media ==
- "La cabeza", a 2019 song by DJ Hamida, Nassi and Imen Es

== See also ==
- Cabezas (disambiguation)
