= Jacobo Rubalcaba =

- Born: Jacobo González Rubalcaba; November 28, 1895; Sagua La Grande, Villa Clara Province, Cuba
- Died: 1960 (aged 64–65) Pinar del Río, Pinar del Río Province, Cuba
- Genres: Cuban danzón, brass band style
- Occupations: Bandleader, arranger, composer, educator
- Instruments: Trumpet, valve trombone
- Years active: 1910–1960

Jacobo González Rubalcaba (1895–1960) was a Cuban musician, composer, bandleader and educator. Born in Sagua La Grande, he adopted his mother's maiden name for professional use.

== Biography ==
Rubalcaba showed deep interest in music from his early years. When he turned 15 , he received musical training at an academy in his hometown in addition to his work as a tailor. Humble, dignified and courteous, Rubalcaba was a remarkable student and quickly became engrossed in his studies. At eighteen years, he began playing the trumpet and valve trombone in the brass band of Santa Clara.

In 1915, Rubalcaba moved to Pinar del Río, where he joined the local military band. From then on, he became a prominent figure in the field of music education, offering a means for exploring alternative approaches and new ideas. In his pedagogical tasks, Rubalcaba displayed the same devotion to duty, advising his students about the combination and subordination of music-theoretical knowledge to practical activity in the performance of one or more instruments, while playing alone or within an ensemble, as is widely recommended in present-day guides.

In between, Rubalcaba founded the first brass band of Pinar del Río, and also established bands in the nearby cities of Mantua, San Luis, and San Juan y Martínez. In 1918, he became the conductor of his own orquesta típica, which helped spread the danzón around the western region of Cuba.

Rubalcaba used cakewalk rhythms in many of his songs, creating popular compositions like Los pinareños, Linda Mercedes, Ulpiano y su contrabajo and Hay que echar manteca. Even though his most significant contribution was the arrangement for his song El cadete constitucional, in which he cleverly included the melody of John Philip Sousa's The Stars and Stripes Forever – a musical thread that was commonly used at the time. According to musicologist Ned Sublette, part of the danzón's success in the early 1900s was its ability to incorporate and absorb all sorts of melodic traditions as the contradanza had previously done. Sublette added that light classics of the nineteenth-century European repertoire were endlessly danzonized, as were popular themes from ragtime and a variety of Cuban genres.

Rubalcaba was also the founder of one of the greatest musical dynasties in Cuba, as many of his descendants would follow in his footsteps to become directors and instrumentalists. His son, the pianist Guillermo Rubalcaba, was the founder of the legendary Charanga Rubalcaba, while his grandson, the pianist and composer Gonzalo Rubalcaba, is one of the most important figures to emerge from Afro-Cuban jazz in the 1990s.

Jacobo Rubalcaba died in 1960 in a traffic collision, while he was travelling from Havana to his home of Pinar del Río.
