= Félix Chappottín =

Cuban trumpeter and bandleader (1907–1983)

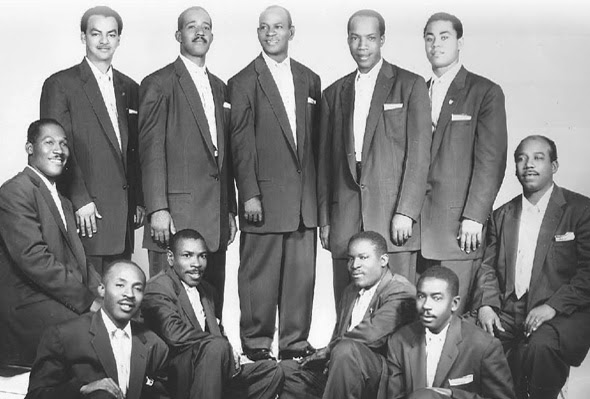
- Félix Chappottín (center) and his conjunto.

Background information
- Birth name: Félix Chappottín Lage
- Born: March 31, 1907; Havana, Cuba
- Died: December 21, 1983 (aged 76); Havana, Cuba
- Genres: Son cubano, guaracha, bolero
- Occupation(s): Musician, bandleader, songwriter
- Instrument: Trumpet
- Years active: 1919-1983
- Labels: Victor, Panart, Puchito, EGREM

Félix Chappottín (March 31, 1907 – December 21, 1983) was a Cuban trumpeter and bandleader. He was a member of three highly successful Cuban bands: Septeto Habanero, Arsenio Rodríguez's conjunto and Conjunto Chappottín, which he directed.

== Life and career ==
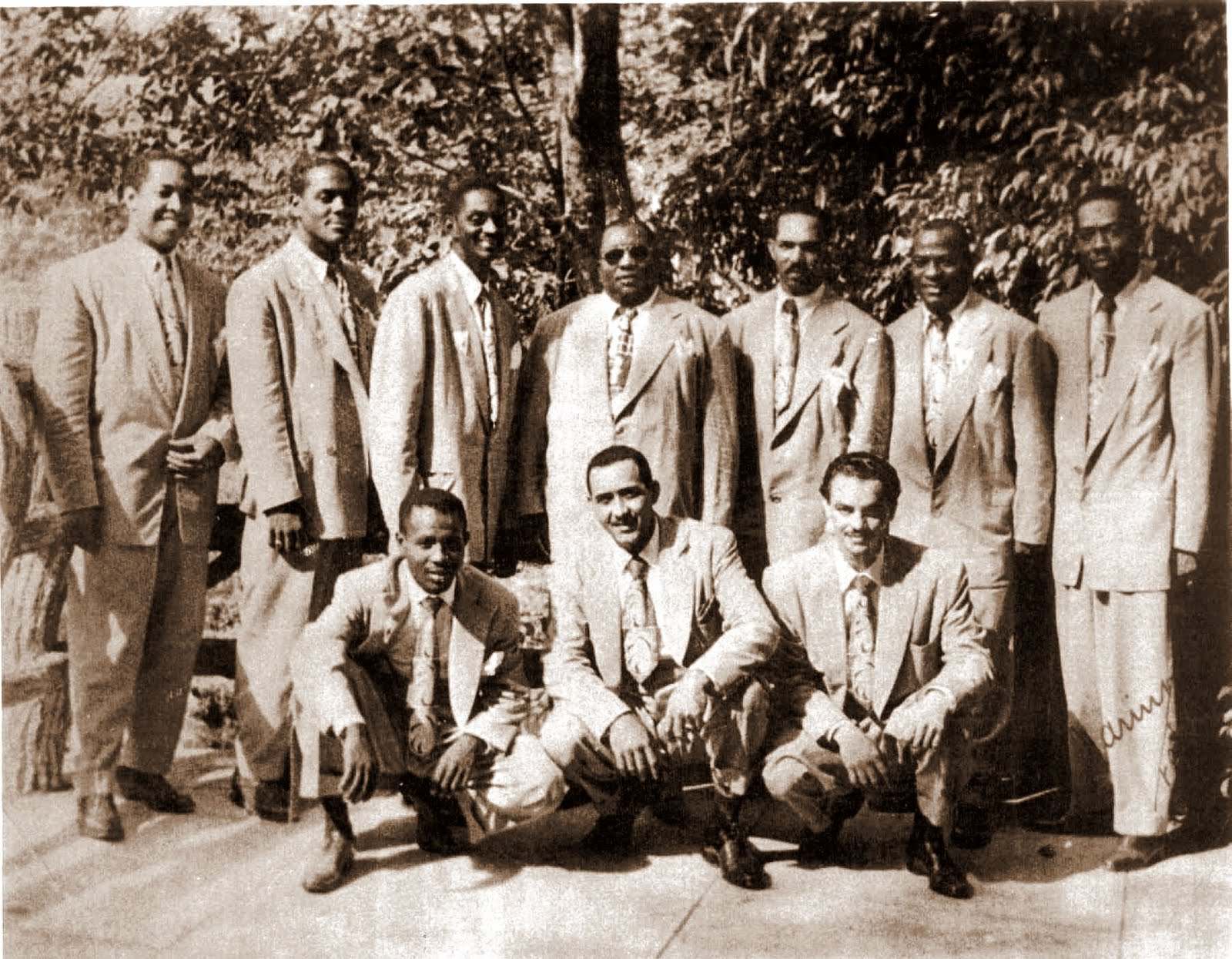
Conjunto de Arsenio Rodríguez ca. 1949. Chappottín is the second from the right, standing.

=== Early life and septeto era ===
Félix Chappottín Lage was born on March 31, 1907, in Cayo Hueso, Havana, to tobacconist/musician Julio Chappottín and housewife Natalia Lage. His father was a member of the son group Los Apaches. At 8 years of age, Chappottín began to study cornet under Venancio González; he later took up the tuba, the oboe and the euphonium. At age twelve he joined the local youth band of Guanajuay. In 1924 he joined the Estudiantina Orquídea de Américo González as trumpeter, and in 1927, he joined the Septeto Habanero, previously the Sexteto Habanero, becoming the most famous trumpeter in Cuba. With the Habanero, Chappottín recorded several 78 rpm singles for Victor between February 1928 and 1930, when he left the band for economic reasons, being replaced by José Interián. He then joined other son septetos: Colín, Munamar (directed by Juan José Izquierdo), Agabama, and Universo (directed by Abelardo Barroso). After the disbandment of Sexteto Boloña in 1935, Chappottín and Jesús "Tata" Gutiérrez founded the Sexteto Bolero. In 1939 he joined the septeto Carabina de Ases.

=== Conjunto era ===
In the 1940s, after the disbandment of Carabina de Ases, Chappottín joined several conjuntos: América, Gloria Cubana, Anacaona (directed by Concepción Castro), Azul (directed by Chano Pozo), Los Jóvenes del Cayo and finally Arsenio Rodríguez's popular conjunto, in 1950. In 1950, Rodríguez decided to continue his career in New York and the members of his conjunto that remained in Havana founded Conjunto Chappottín, which was directed by Chappottín, with the arrangements of pianist Lilí Martínez and featuring Miguelito Cuní on lead vocals. The band became one of the most popular conjuntos of the 1950s with hits such as "Alto Songo".

=== Later years and death ===
Chappottín remained the leader of his conjunto until his death, which took place on December 21, 1983, in Havana.

== Legacy ==
Chappottín is widely regarded as the founder of the modern Cuban trumpet style due to his innovative approach in the development of son cubano between the 1920s and 1950s. According to Craig Harris, writer for AllMusic, Chappottín "continued to inspire Afro-Cuban music with his sweet-toned trumpet playing for more than six decades". In 2002, Chappottín was posthumously inducted into the International Latin Music Hall of Fame.

After his death, his son and later his grandson have directed Conjunto Chappottín.
