= Luis Griñán =

- Born: Camilo Bueno Jacas; Santiago de Cuba, Cuba
- Died: 1961 Havana, Cuba
- Genres: Son cubano, guaracha, bolero, afro
- Occupations: Musician, bandleader, composer
- Instruments: Piano, guitar
- Years active: 1950-61
- Labels: Panart, Krystal, Suave, Griñán, Makucey

Luis Griñán Camacho (d. 1961) was a Cuban independent bandleader, pianist, guitarist and record producer. He is best known for his composition "Quimbombó", recorded by Conjunto Chappottín among others. This famous son cubano is often miscredited to its arranger, the similarly named Luis Martínez Griñán.

== Career ==
Between 1959 and 1960, Griñán established his own independent record label, Griñán, and released two albums as a leader. He worked with two well known arrangers of the time: trombonist Generoso Jiménez "Tojo" and pianist Luis Martínez Griñán "Lilí". He also produced albums for Orquesta Ritmo Oriental, Orquesta Ideal and Orquesta Los Maguarayeros.

== Death ==
He died in 1961 and was survived by his wife, Oresia Madrazo, a prolific songwriter.

== Discography ==
Albums

- 1959: Ritos santeros (issued by Kristal/Suave in the mid-1960s)
- 1960: Quimbombó (issued by Kristal/Suave in the mid-1960s)

Singles

- Agallú Solá / Qué alegre está la Caridad (Panart, 1950)
- La Totí / Solamente tú (Griñán, 1959)
- Perdonarte jamás / Bien juntito a la mía (Griñán, 1959)
- Ya estoy resignado / Como lloran (Griñán, 1959)
- Oración a Santa Bárbara / Llorando y con pena (Griñán, 1959)
- Bembé sin zapatos / Besando tu boca (Griñán, 1960)
- No te vayas pa'l monte / Son humanista (Griñán, 1960)

With Orquesta Caramelo del 61

- Tú no vales la pena / Pronto te casarás (Makucey, 1961)
- Yo no vendo la chiva / Vengo a tus pies (Makucey, 1961)
