= Tres (Llanos) =

Plucked string instrument of Colombian and Venezuelan origin

String instrument
- Classification: String instrument (plucked)
- Developed: 16th–17th centuries, Llanos

Related instruments
- Cuatro; Cuban tres

More articles or information
- Joropo

The tres (lit. 'three') of the Llanos was a primitive, three-course plucked string instrument, a member of the guitar family.

Traditionally small in size, it was made from light tonewood and assembled with rudimentary adhesives; its tuning pegs were made from the thorns of the corozo tree (Acrocomia aculeata), its frets from the veins of palm trees of the Wettinia family, and it was strung with catgut. The lack of metal parts gave the tres of the Llanos a unique sound.

It was an instrument used in joropo music. By the 1960s, it had already fallen into disuse.

== See also ==
- Cuatro
- Cuban tres
- Joropo
