= Punto guajiro =

Cuban music genre

Punto guajiro or punto cubano – or simply punto – is a sung genre of Cuban music, a poetic art with music. It became popular in the western and central regions of Cuba in the 17th century, and consolidated as a genre in the 18th century. It has Andalusian and Canary Islands origins, and it integrated African elements in Cuba.

== Description ==
Punto is played by a group with various types of guitar: the Spanish guitar, the Cuban tres, the laúd and the tiple. The punto refers to the use of a pick (punteando), rather than strumming (rasgueado). There are three percussion instruments: the clave, the güiro and the guayo (also a scraper, but of metal). Singers form themselves into teams, and improvise their lines. They sing, or chant, an unvarying melody, with intervals between stanzas to give the singers time to prepare the next verse.

Early compositions were sometimes recorded in print, as were the names of some of the singer/composers. Beginning around 1935, punto reached a peak of popularity on Cuban radio. Nothing was done to record their work, but as it happens, a stenographer, Aida Bode, was a fan of this genre, and she wrote down the verses as they were broadcast. Finally, in 1997, her transcriptions were published in book form.

Celina González and Albita both sang punto in the first part of their careers, proving that the genre is still alive, though perhaps moribund in its original form. Celina has one of the great voices in popular music, and her supporting group Campo Alegre is outstanding. For aficionados, however, Indio Naborí (Sabio Jesús Orta Ruiz, b. 30 September 1922) is the greatest name in punto, for his decima poetry, which he wrote daily for the radio and newspapers. He is also a published author, with several collections of his poetry, much of which has a political nueva trova edge.

== Types of punto ==
- Punto pinareño (punto libre or vueltabajero): from the western province of Pinar del Río. A free style, with a fluent, melodic line, a slow tempo and a variable meter.
- Punto en clave (punto fijo: from the provinces of Camagüey and Las Villas. A fixed style with singer maintaining the same tempo and meter.
- Punto espirituano: from Sancti Spiritus province.
- Punto matancero: from Matanzas province.
- Punto seguidilla: "several stanzas (décimas) sung without interruption, to a tune which can at any time break off the song."

== Interpreters of the punto ==
This is a list of performers of the punto sufficiently notable to be mentioned in print.

=== 20th century ===
- Juan R. Limendoux
- Gregorio Morejón
- Ordóñez Santana
- Edelmira Vera
- Pedro de Armas
- Antonio Camino
- Justo Vega (Cabezas, 9 August 1900 – Havana 31 January 1993)
- José Sánchez León (b. San Antonio de los Baños 1899)
- Pedro Guerra (b. La Salud)
- Fortún del Sol, Colorín, (b. Cienfuegos)
- Chanito Isidrón (Calabazar de Sagua, 1903 – Havana, 22 February 1987)
- Rigoberto Rizo (Madruga, 1907)
- Adolfo Alfonso
- Innocente Iznaga (Cienfuegos, 29 December 1930)
- Martica Morejón (b. 21 June 1942)
- Guillermo Portabales
- Ángel Valiente, Angelito, (San Antonio de los Baños, 28 February 1916 – 21 January 1987)
- Jesús Orta Ruiz, Indio Naborí, (San Miguel del Padrón, Havana, 30 September 1922)
- Jose Marichal. El Sinsonte de Govea. (Guira de Melena, Habana)
- Luis Gómez
- Rene Espinosa
- Nazario Segura
- Omar Mirabal
- Jesús Rodríguez
- Francisco Reyes Castano "El Cacique Jaruqueno", (Jaruco, Cuba, 24 July 1917–Miami, Florida, April 1978)
- Jose Antonio Tejeda
- Paula Garcia Coro, "La Calándria de los Palmares" (Canalete, Pinar del Rio, 16 March 1928; Cleveland, Ohio, USA, 20 August 2013)
