= Barbarito Díez =

Cuban singer (1910–1995)

Barbarito Diez

Background information
- Birth name: Bárbaro Díez Junco
- Born: December 4, 1910; Bolondrón, Matanzas Province, Cuba
- Died: May 6, 1995 (aged 84); Havana, Cuba
- Genres: Danzón
- Years active: 1935–1990
- Formerly of: Antonio María Romeu; Isaac Oviedo; Guillermo Rubalcaba

Barbarito Díez (December 4, 1910 – May 6, 1995) was a Cuban singer who specialized in danzón. He began his career as the singer for Graciano Gómez and Isaac Oviedo's son group, before joining Antonio María Romeu's orchestra. As the lead vocalist for Romeu's ensemble for 20 years, he established himself as one of the main exponents of the sung danzón. He continued singing with his own charanga, as well as other groups, for another 30 years. He also toured and recorded in Venezuela and Puerto Rico before retiring in the early 1990s, when complications from diabetes prevented him from performing and eventually resulted in his death in 1995. A naturally-gifted tenor, he was known for his sense of rhythm, correct diction and romantic style.

== Early life ==
Bárbaro Díez Junco was born on December 4, 1910 (Día de Santa Barbara), in a sugar cane mill located in the small settlement of Bolondrón in Matanzas Province, as the only child born to Eugenio Díez and Salustiana del Junco. (Note: Many sources incorrectly cite his birth as happening in 1909 in Manatí. In interviews, he always claimed to have been born in 1910 at the San Rafael de Jorrín sugar mill, Bolondrón.) When he was four years old, Díez moved with his parents to Manatí, Oriente Province, where his father worked in another mill for years. The family lived in a batey, where the young Díez attended elementary school and intuitively began to sing the repertoire of songs that Trio Matamoros had created.

== Professional career ==
As a result, Díez established himself as a well-respected, professional performer in his Oriente Province home at the age of fourteen. He then moved to Havana in 1930, in search of better working conditions and remuneration. Even though he formed a successful guitar trio along with Graciano Gómez and Isaac Oviedo a year later, Díez received an invitation from pianist and composer Antonio María Romeu to join his dance band in 1935, where he continued thereafter as its main soloist. After Romeu died in 1955, the orchestra continued playing under the leadership of his son Antonio María Romeu Jr. with Díez as lead singer. Some years later the band was renamed Orquesta de Barbarito Díez.

During his career, Díez toured the Dominican Republic, Mexico, Puerto Rico, Venezuela and the United States in concerts and recorded eleven albums of his extensive repertoire of danzón music, well on his way to becoming a household name outside of Cuba. In addition, strengthened by a considerably large and stable fanbase in Venezuela, Díez thanked his audience for their support and offered a collection of diverse Venezuelan music genres in his albums Barbarito Díez canta a Venezuela Volumes 1 & 2, which were released in 1977 and 1980, respectively. He then recorded a handful of Latin American songs backed by the group Rondalla Venezolana in 1985. Three years later, he made his last recording session with the Charanga Típica orchestra directed by Guillermo Rubalcaba.

== Late life ==
In one of his last interviews, Díez left a message for his audience: "I want everyone to know how grateful I am for the love, respect and consideration they have always given me. I say out loud that I have the biggest thrill to see that you still listen with pleasure, so I will sing until I run out of strength to do it."

Barbarito Díez died in 1995 from diabetes-related complications at age 85.

== Partial list of recorded songs ==
- A Sancti Spiritus
- Alma de roca
- Alli donde tú sabes
- Amor azul
- Amor eterno
- Amor inviolado
- Ansiedad
- Añoranza
- Aquella boca
- Aquella tarde
- Arroyito de mi pueblo
- Asómate a la ventana
- Aurora de mi amor
- Ausencia
- Bajo un palmar
- Bella zulianita
- Boda gris
- Brumas del mar
- Calina
- Canta pajarito
- Canto a mi madre adorada
- Capullito de alelí
- Como arrullo de palmas
- Como mi vida gris
- Con mentira y realidad
- Coro gentil
- Creí que eras mía
- Cuando me quieras
- Cuba y sus misterios
- Cuna de Héroes
- De París un Caballero
- Después
- Don Galaor
- Dos letras
- Dos lindas rosas
- Dulce embeleso
- El adios
- El amor de mi bohío
- El erial
- El soldado
- En el sendero de mi vida
- En falso
- Enamorada
- Entre espumas
- Esas no son cubanas
- Felíz cumpleaños
- Flor de Yumurí
- Flores negras
- Frenesí
- Frío en el alma
- Gotas de amor
- Guajira y cubana
- Habanera, ven
- Humo en los ojos
- Idolatría
- Jamás te acusaré
- Juana y José
- Junto al palmar del bajío
- La carta
- La cleptómana
- La guinda
- La mora
- La perla del Edén
- La reina
- La sitiera
- La vida nos llama
- La vieja Ramona
- Las calles de San Juan
- Las flores que me diste
- Las perlas de tu boca
- Lágrimas negras
- Lamento borincano
- Linda cubana
- Longina
- Luna de Margarita
- Manantial
- Maracaibera
- Mares y arenas
- Margarita
- Martha
- Mensaje
- Mercedes
- Mi canto a Cabaiguán
- Mi dulce serenata
- Mi pueblo
- Mi Santa Bárbara
- Mis anhelos
- Mírame más
- Motivos
- Mujer
- Mujer merideña
- Mujer perjura
- Muñeca de cristal
- Noche de mar
- Novia de Año Nuevo
- Nunca
- Ojos de sirena
- Ojos malvados
- Olvidé su nombre
- Olvido
- Oriente cuna Florida
- Palmeras
- Panamá viejo
- Para que lo oigas
- Perla marina
- Porqué, corazón
- Potpourri de danzones
- Presagio
- Qué noche tan linda
- Que te castigue Dios
- Reina del sitio
- Reina guajira
- Rosa roja
- Santa Cecilia
- Se fue
- Sencillez
- Si llego a besarte
- Te odio
- Te quiero dijiste
- Te vieron con él
- Todo es para ti
- Tu carita de ángel
- Tú no comprendes
- Tus amargas verdades
- Un canto a mi Camaiguán
- Un juramento de amor
- Una Rosa de Francia
- Veinte años
- Volverá la alegría
- ¿Y tú qué has hecho?
- Ya es muy tarde
- Ya nunca más
- Yo reiré cuando tú llores
- Yo sé de una mujer

== International tours ==
=== Dominican Republic ===
- Backed by Antonio María Romeu orchestra (1958)

=== Mexico ===
- Backed by the Charanga Típica de Conciertos led by Guillermo Rubalcaba (1981; 1985)

=== Puerto Rico ===
- Backed by Septeto Gloria Mantancera (1933)

=== United States ===
- Backed by Antonio María Romeu orchestra (1959, New York City; 1960, Miami)

=== Venezuela ===
All backed by his orchestra

- Poliedro de Caracas (1980)
- InterContinental Tamanaco, Caracas (1980)
- Caracas, Barquisimeto and Maracay (1981), sharing stage with Orquesta Aragón, Grupo Son 14 de Adalberto Álvarez, and El Trabuco Venezolano led by Alberto Naranjo
- Caracas Athenaeum (1984), sharing stage with Pablo Milanés and other Cuban artists

== See also ==
- Paulina Álvarez
