= Guillermo Rubalcaba =

- Birth name: Guillermo González Camejo
- Born: January 10, 1927; Pinar del Río, Pinar del Río, Cuba
- Died: September 7, 2015 (aged 88); Havana, Cuba
- Genres: Danzón, cha-cha-cha
- Occupation(s): Bandleader, arranger, composer
- Instrument(s): Piano, violin, clarinet, saxophone

Guillermo Rubalcaba (January 10, 1927 – September 7, 2015) was a Cuban pianist, bandleader, composer and orchestrator specialising in danzón and cha-cha-cha music genres.

Born as Guillermo González Camejo in the town of Pinar del Río, as the son of Jacobo González Rubalcaba he adopted his father's maternal name for professional purposes. In the same way, Guillermo Rubalcaba was the father of the Latin jazz pianist who has adopted the name Gonzalo Rubalcaba.

== Life and career ==
=== Early years ===
Rubalcaba received formal musical training from his father, Jacobo Rubalcaba, a talented multi-instrumentalist and also one of the first charanga bandleaders to spread the danzón in the western region of Cuba. Likewise, his father composed the legendary danzón El Cadete Constitucional, which has been recorded by countless performers for a long time. Rubalcaba studied at the Orbón Conservatory, where he learned to play not only the piano, but also the violin, the clarinet and the saxophone. At age 15 he became the violinist in the Ases del Ritmo orchestra, later playing in the CMQ radio orchestra and in Ñico Suárez's band. On saxophone he performed in the Montecarlo orchestra and as part of Los Churumbeles.

=== Rise to fame ===
Not long after moving to Havana, Guillermo Rubalcaba worked as pianist accompanist for famous singers such as Elena Burke, Blanca Rosa Gil and Omara Portuondo, and also developed a close relationship with veteran flutist Richard Egües, who recommended him to violinist and cha-cha-cha bandleader Enrique Jorrín.

In 1964 Rubalcaba joined the Jorrín orchestra in a tour scheduled in several countries of Africa and Europe. He then found himself on the move again, this time through North, Central and South America, which included a stop in the Expo 67 held in Montreal, Quebec, Canada, until he entered the Charanga Típica de Concierto in 1968, invited by musicologist Odilio Urfé. The purpose of the band was to preserve the danzón tradition in its original form. Rubalcaba became the pianist and later the conductor of the ensemble, which in 1973 became known as the Charanga Rubalcaba. In 1987, the Charanga Rubalcaba released its most successful album, Vivencias, which featured Barbarito Díez and Tito Gómez, two of the most significant voices of the danzón and cha-cha-cha in Cuban music history.

=== Later years and death ===
In the 1990s, Rubalcaba became a member of several touring groups of veteran musicians who emerged in the wake of the success of the Buena Vista Social Club and Afro-Cuban All Stars groups. In between, he collaborated with Jane Bunnett in her recording project Cuban Odyssey (2002).

Latterly, Rubalcaba ran and directed his orchestra named after him, in which he was also the pianist. Rubalcaba's career more than that of any danzonero has lived the period of early revolutionary effervescence, lethargy, and slow revival in recent times. Rubalcaba died on September 7, 2015, in Havana, and was buried at the Cristóbal Colón Cemetery.

== Awards and honours ==
- 2002: Alejo Carpentier Medal

== Discography ==
- Vivencias (Areito – LD-4435, 1988)
- Fundadores del Sabor (Discmedi S.A. – DM-210, 1995)
- Por eso yo soy cubano (Eurotropical Muxxic – EUCD-10, 1998)
- El Danzón de la Reina Isabel (Eurotropical – EUCD-901526, 2000)
- A corazón abierto (Eurotropical – Muxxic 8431588-909225, 2002).
- Entre dos generaciones (Envidia Records – ER-7080, 2003)
- Pasado Y Presente (Pimienta Records, 2003)
- Con sello de calidad (Envidia – ER-7116, 2004)
