= Estrellas de Chocolate =

Conjunto Estrellas de Chocolate
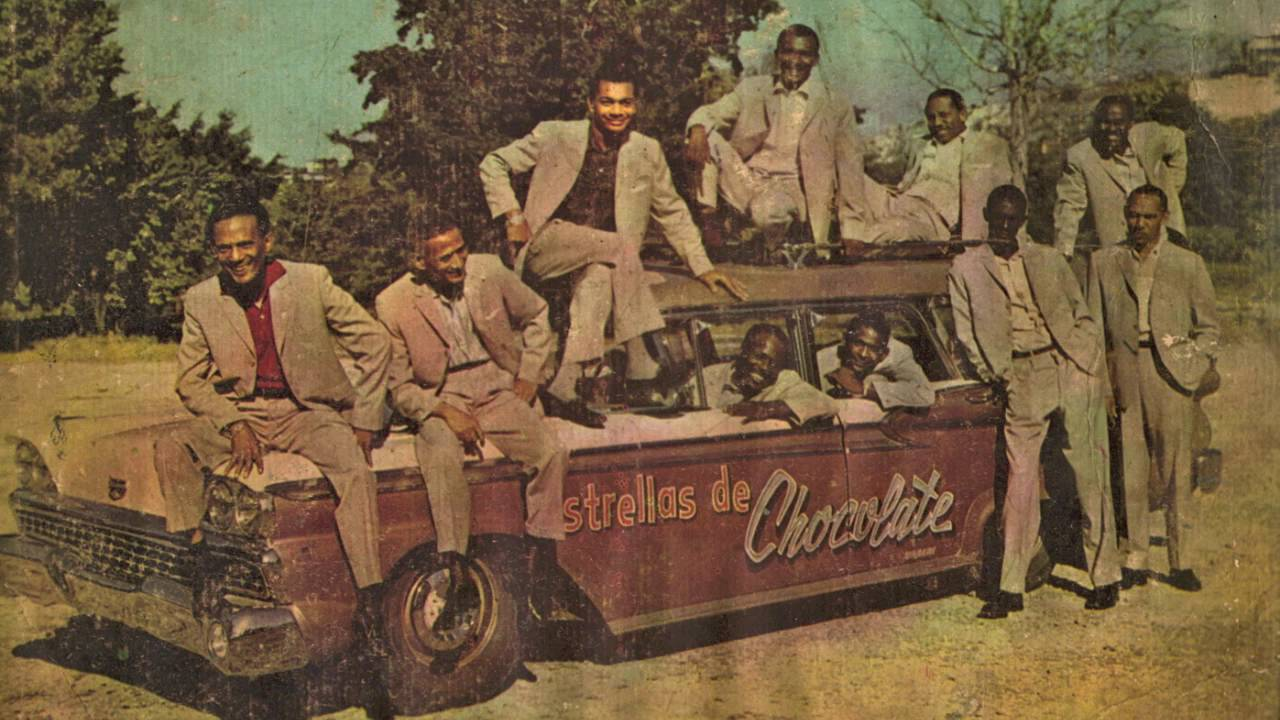

Background information
- Origin: Havana, Cuba
- Genres: Son cubano; bolero; pilón
- Years active: 1959-present
- Labels: Puchito, Antilla, Maype, Fórmula Touza, Bravo, EGREM
- Past members: Félix "Chocolate" Alfonso; Niño Rivera; Agustín Cabrera; David Palomares; Armando Albertini "El Gorila"; "Chino" León Lahera; Arístides Valmaseda; Filiberto Hernández; Sergio de Cuba; Pichi; Papi Oviedo; Lilí Martínez; Ignacio Capetillo

Estrellas de Chocolate is a Cuban son conjunto founded by conguero Félix "Chocolate" Alfonso in 1959. Its original lineup featured Niño Rivera (tres), Agustín Cabrera (vocals, guitar), David Palomares (piano), Armando Albertini "El Gorila" (trumpet), "Chino" León Lahera (lead vocals), Arístides Valmaseda (lead vocals), Filiberto Hernández (vocals), Sergio de Cuba (double bass) and Pichi (bongo). Albertini and Palomares directed the band, while Rivera was responsible for the arrangements.

The style of the group was largely inspired by previous conjuntos such as Arsenio Rodríguez's (of which Alfonso had been a member between 1945 and 1950), Conjunto Chappottín (also a spin-off of Arsenio's) and Conjunto Casino. Throughout the early 1960s the band gained popularity in Cuba, releasing several albums nationally and to American Latin music markets. They enjoyed particular success in Curaçao and Aruba, which they toured in 1960. After the release of their first album, Fiesta cubana (1960), Rivera was replaced by Papi Oviedo, who recorded mostly on an amplified tres. Moreover, Lilí Martínez, another former member of Arsenio's conjunto, joined the band on piano.

Johnny Pacheco named his label Fania Records, as well as its band the Fania All-Stars, after Estrellas de Chocolate's 1960 song "Fania". As of 2003, Conjunto Estrellas de Chocolate remained active in Cuba.

== Discography ==
- Fiesta cubana (Puchito, 1960), reissued as Guaguancó a todos los barrios (Antilla, 1960)
- Fiesta en Curaçao (Bravo, 1960)
- ...y la vaca vieja (Bravo, 1960) — with Caridad Cuervo
- Conjunto Estrellas de Chocolate (Bravo, 1961)
- Mi son pilón (Fórmula Touza)
- Los inéditos en vivo de Estrellas de Chocolate (Colección de Diamante Vol. 5)
