= Germán Pedro Ibáñez =

Cuban composer (1928–2007)

Germán Pedro Ibáñez (October 11, 1928 – August 9, 2007) was the director of Son Cubano musical group Septeto Habanero.

Ibáñez, who was born in Las Villas, conducted the group for over four decades, during which they recorded some 50 albums.

The group were the first to record in New York City the son in 1925, which made the son fashionable. Ibáñez joined the Septeto Habanero in 1964 and during his lifetime he received numerous awards, including the Distinción por la Cultura Nacional (Distinction by the National Culture), and the medal Alejo Carpentier.
