= Sauquillo de Cabezas =

- Municipality
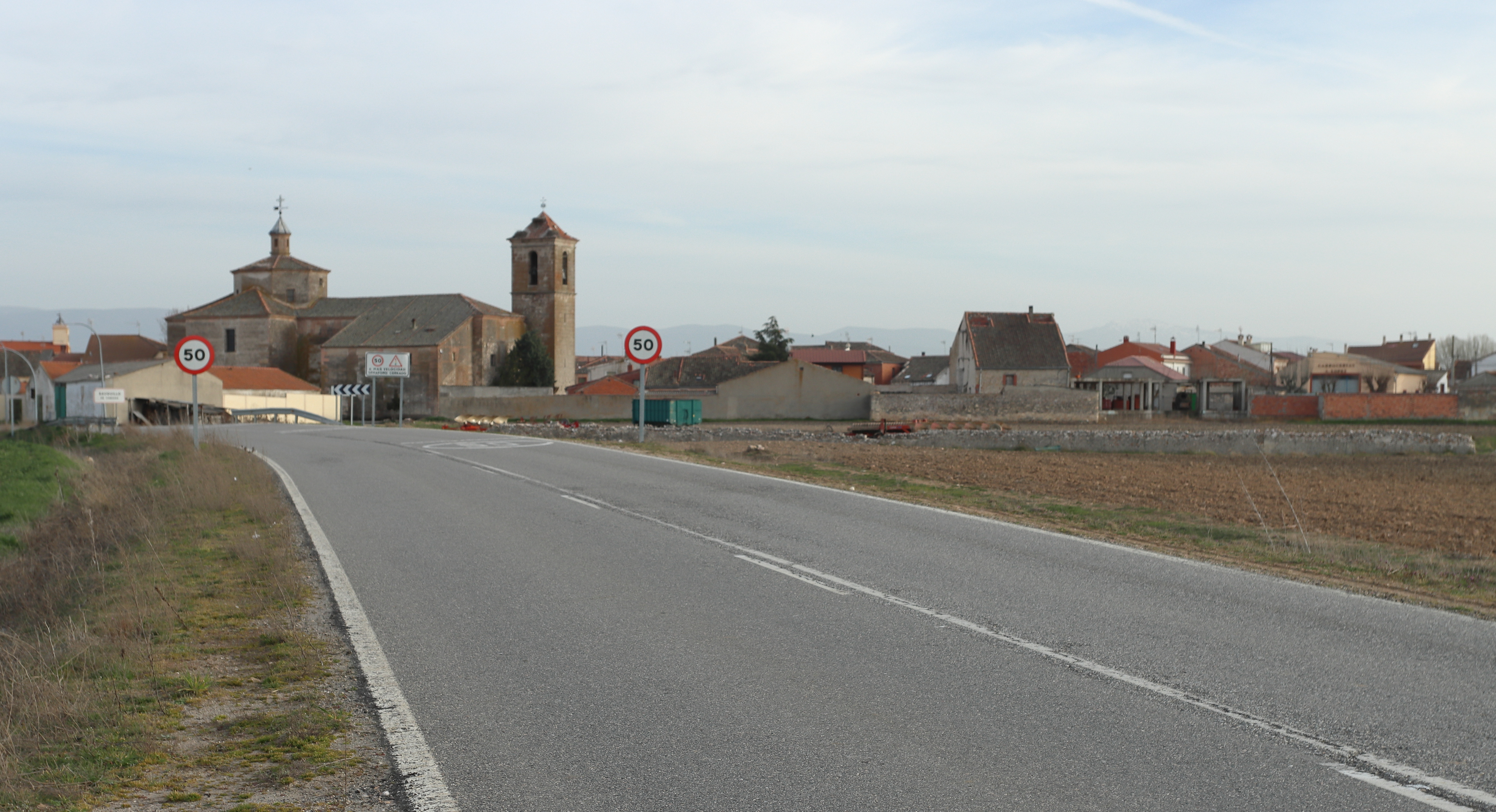
- Major Road and houses in Sauquillo de Cabezas

- Location in Spain. Sauquillo de Cabezas (Spain)
- Coordinates: 41°11′39″N 4°04′05″W
- Country: Spain
- Autonomous community: Castile and León
- Province: Segovia
- Municipality: Sauquillo de Cabezas

Area
  - Total: 20 km^{2} (7.7 sq mi)

Population (2025-01-01)
  - Total: 135
  - Density: 6.7/km^{2} (17/sq mi)
- Time zone: UTC+1 (CET)
  - Summer (DST): UTC+2 (CEST)
- Website: Official website

Sauquillo de Cabezas is a municipality located in the province of Segovia, Castile and León, Spain. According to the 2004 census (INE), the municipality has a population of 231 inhabitants.
