= Cabezas del Pozo =

- municipality
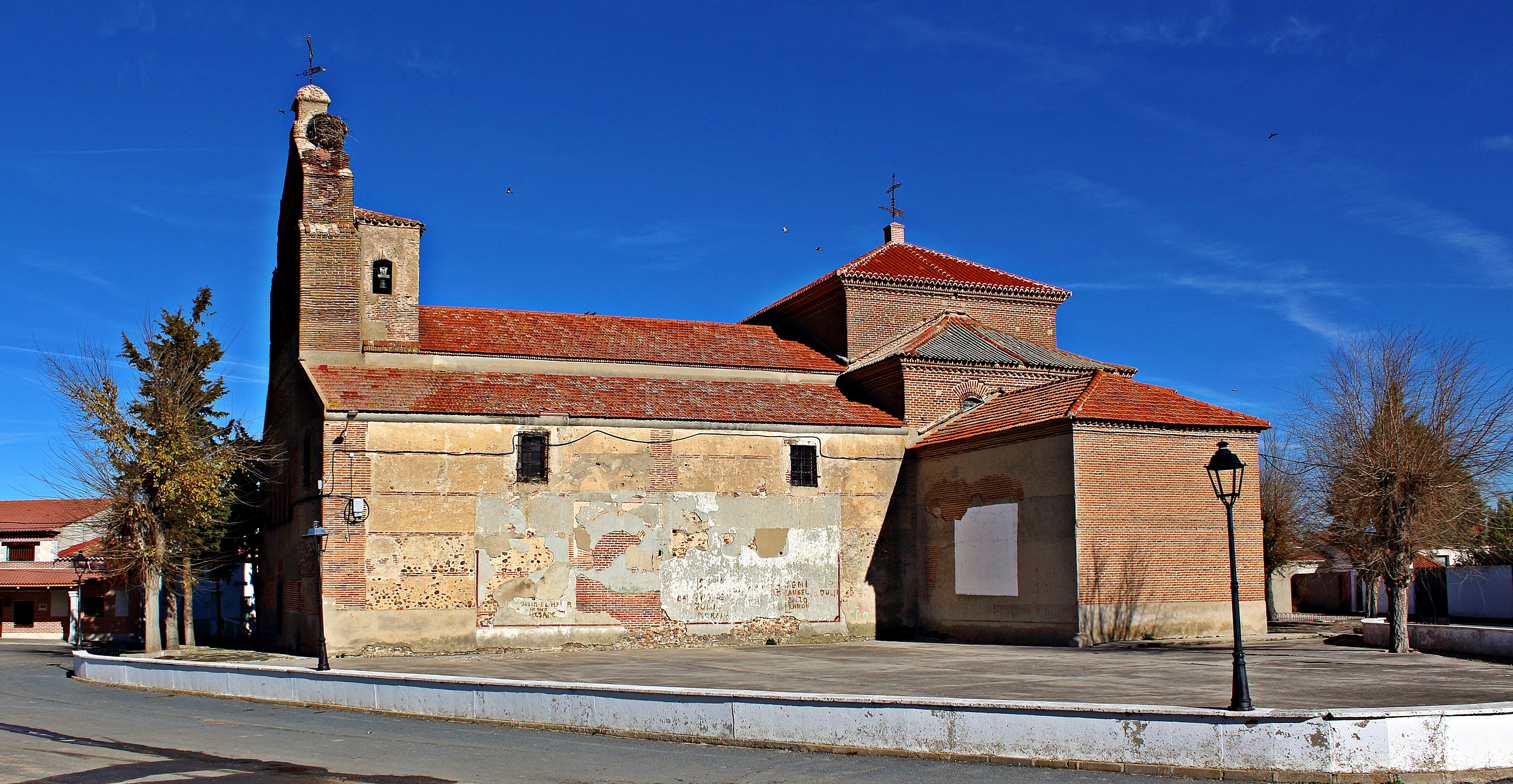
- Our Lady of the Assumption Church

- Flag Coat of arms

- Location in Spain. Cabezas del Pozo (Spain)
- Coordinates: 41°00′02″N 4°57′08″W
- Country: Spain
- Autonomous community: Castile and León
- Province: Ávila
- Municipality: Cabezas del Pozo

Area
  - Total: 17.97 km^{2} (6.94 sq mi)
- Elevation: 844 m (2,769 ft)

Population (2025-01-01)
  - Total: 80
  - Density: 4.5/km^{2} (12/sq mi)
- Time zone: UTC+1 (CET)
  - Summer (DST): UTC+2 (CEST)
- Website: Official website

Cabezas del Pozo is a municipality located in the province of Ávila, Castile and León, Spain. According to the 2006 census (INE), the municipality had a population of 116 inhabitants.

== Population ==
Historical population
Year	Pop.	±% p.a.
2023	89	—
2024	82	−7.87%
2025	80	−2.44%
Source: INE
