= Pedro Lugo =

Cuban singer

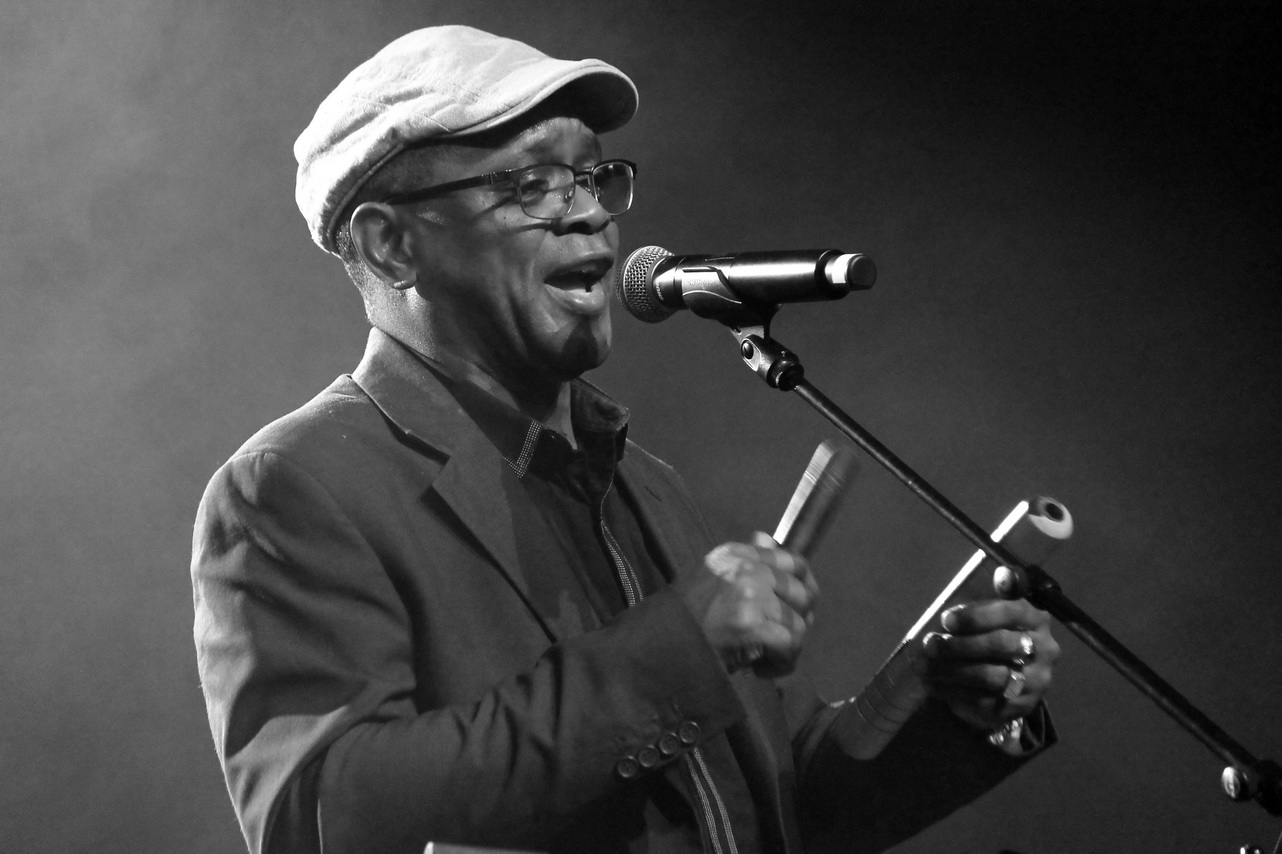
Pedro Lugo "El Nene" in 2019.

Pedro Lugo Martínez (born 1 August 1960), better known as El Nene, is a Cuban singer. He specializes in both son cubano and rumba, having sung for La Monumental, Clave y Guaguancó and Conjunto Chappottín. He is also the founder and lead vocalist of Jóvenes Clásicos del Son, a traditional son septet founded in 1994. In 2006, he formed another son septet, Son del Nene, in which he is also the lead vocalist. He has recorded albums in collaboration with Celeste Mendoza, Tata Güines, Estrellas de Areito, Zanja All Stars and rumba ensembles such as Rapsodia Rumbera and Team Cuba de la Rumba.
