= Cabezas, Cordillera =

Coordinates: 18°46′S 63°24′W

Cabezas
- Town
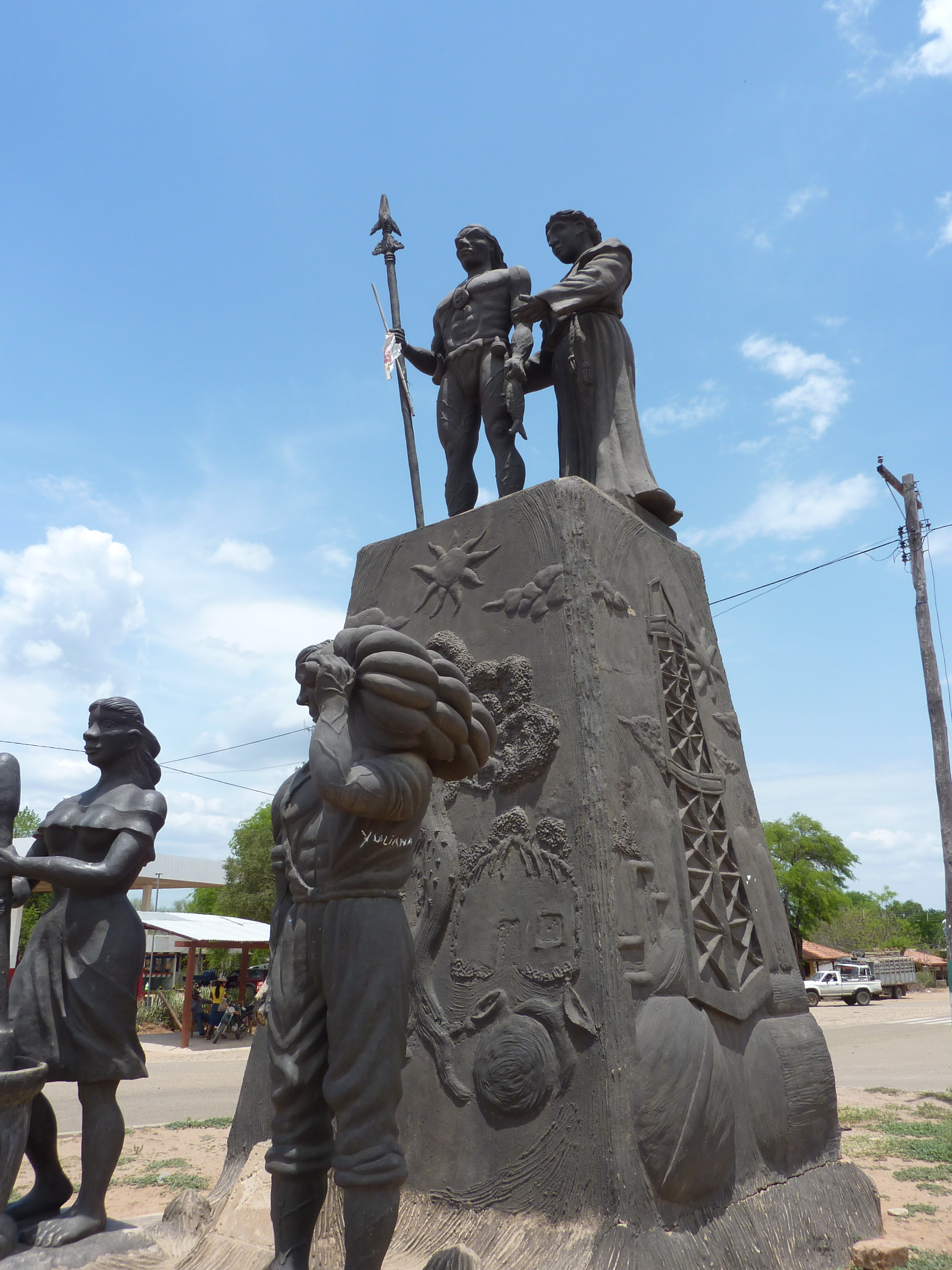
- Statue of Fray Francisco del Pilar
- Interactive map of Cabezas
- Country: Bolivia
- Department: Santa Cruz
- Province: Cordillera
- Municipality: Cabezas

Population (2001)
  - Total: 1,392
- Time zone: UTC-4 (BOT)

Cabezas is a small town in Bolivia, seat of Cabezas Municipality. In 2010 it had an estimated population of 1971.

== Geography ==
The town is located in the middle of its municipality, on the southeastern edge of the Cordillera Oriental mountain range.

=== Climate ===
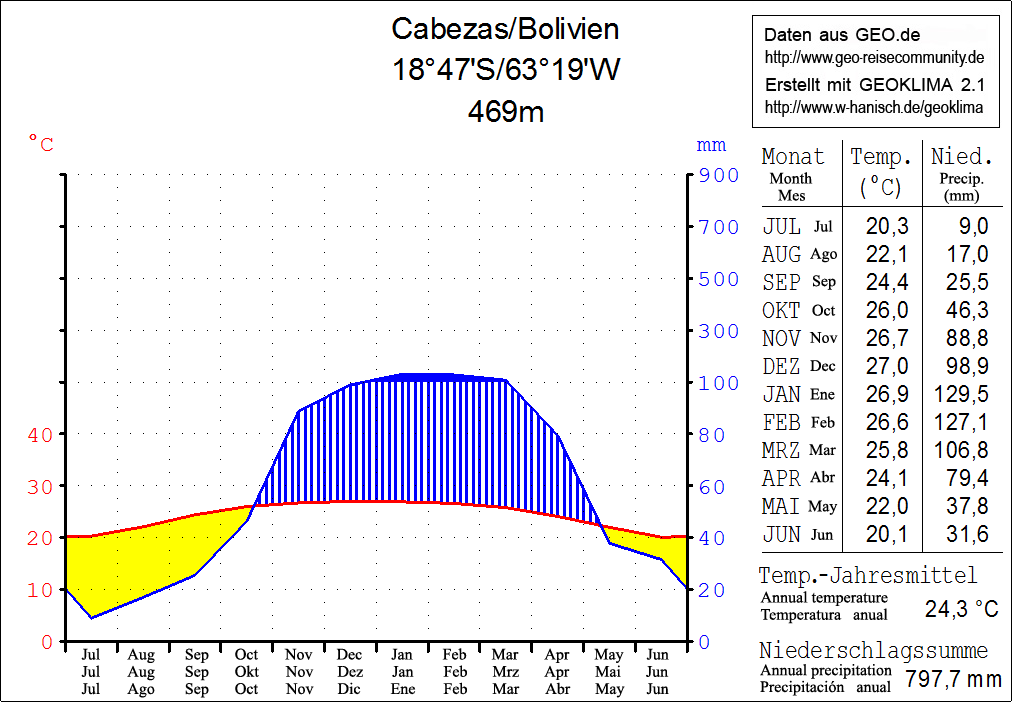
Climate diagram of Cabezas
