= Escarabajosa de Cabezas =

- Municipality
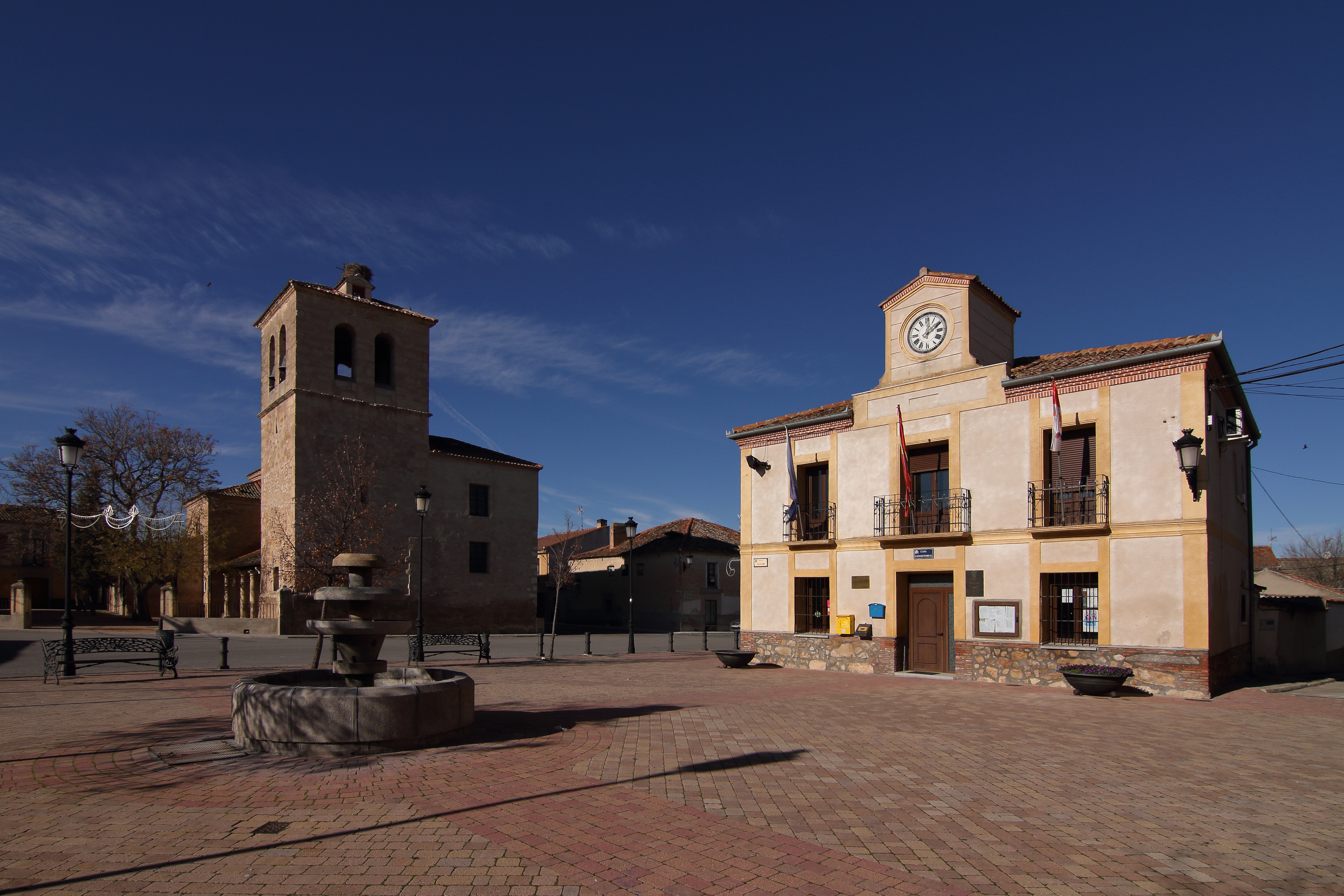
- Town hall and church in Escarabajosa de Cabezas

- Location in Spain. Escarabajosa de Cabezas (Spain)
- Coordinates: 41°06′16″N 4°11′36″W
- Country: Spain
- Autonomous community: Castile and León
- Province: Segovia
- Municipality: Escarabajosa de Cabezas

Area
  - Total: 16.04 km^{2} (6.19 sq mi)
- Elevation: 884 m (2,900 ft)

Population (2025-01-01)
  - Total: 269
  - Density: 16.8/km^{2} (43.4/sq mi)
- Time zone: UTC+1 (CET)
  - Summer (DST): UTC+2 (CEST)
- Website: Official website

Escarabajosa de Cabezas is a municipality located in the province of Segovia, Castile and León, Spain. According to the 2004 census (INE), the municipality had a population of 363 inhabitants.
