= Omar Cabezas =

Nicaraguan politician and author (born 1950)

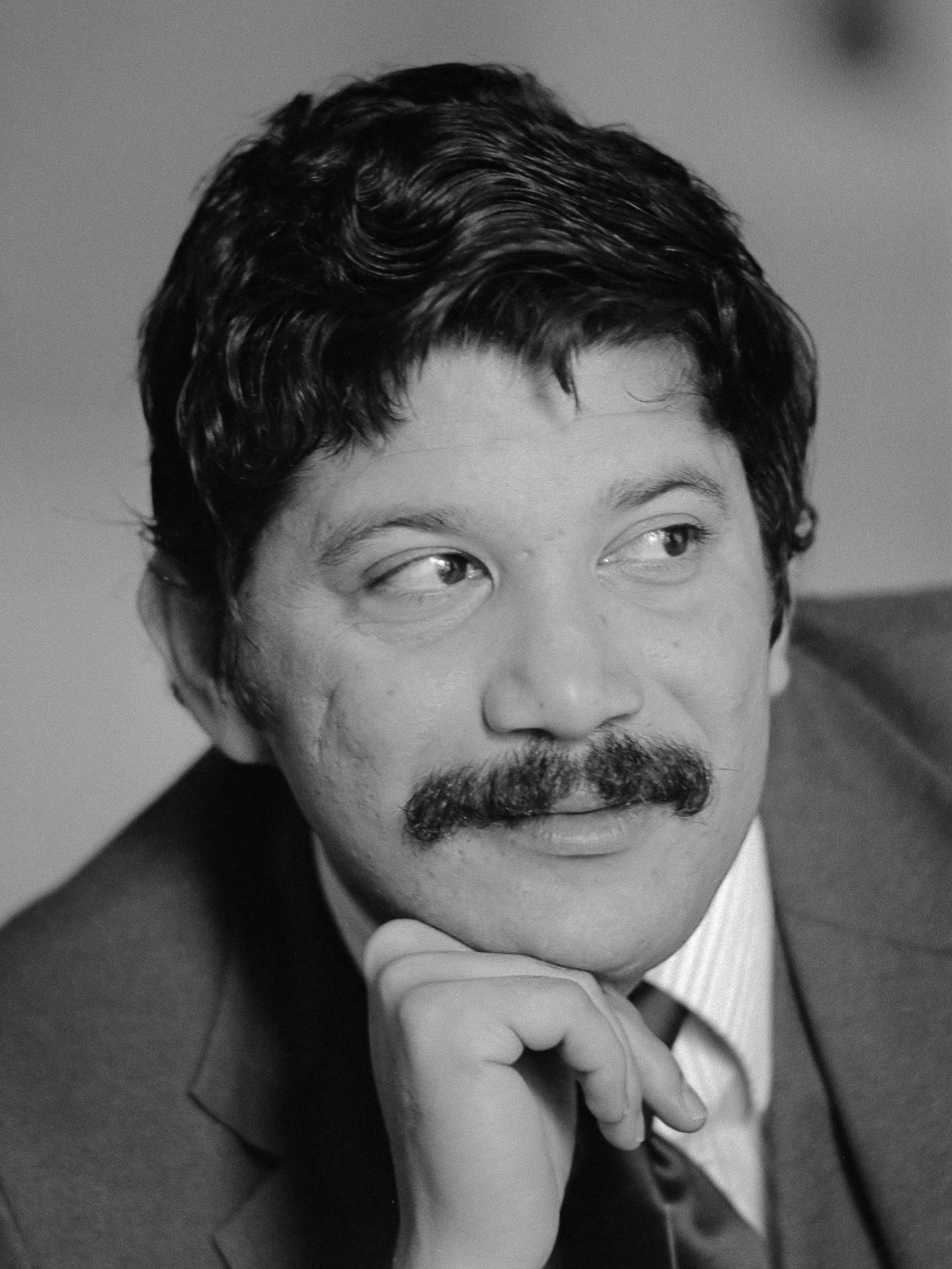
Omar Cabezas (1983)

Omar Cabezas Lacayo (born 1950 in León, Nicaragua) is a Nicaraguan author, revolutionary and politician. He was a commander in the guerrilla war against Anastasio Somoza Debayle, and prominent Sandinista party member. He wrote a personal account of his days as a guerrilla fighting the Somoza dynasty entitled Fire From the Mountain (published in Nicaragua as La montaña es algo mas que una inmensa estepa verde).

This personal testimony can be read as a bildungsroman, or novela de formación in Spanish. In it, Cabezas learns about life, about social injustice, about women, and about the difficulty of overthrowing a dictatorship. He struggles against nature; an infection he suffers from being on the mountain puts his life in jeopardy. He overcomes numerous obstacles in his quest to bring down the brutal US-supported thirty year Somoza dynasty in an environment defined by terror and hope (such as the violent shootout between the military and the Sandinista militant Julio Buitrago). Cabezas' story is about an idealist man in a time when it meant something to be heroic. It is also known for being the first major work in the Nicaraguan vernacular, rather than formal Spanish.

Cabezas would later write a sequel, Canción de amor para los hombres.

Cabezas was a member of the Sandinista government, until he was stripped of his positions in 1987, following disagreement with other leading Sandinistas. He was elected to the National Assembly in the 1990 elections, and continues as a public figure to this day.
