= Cabezas del Villar =

- municipality
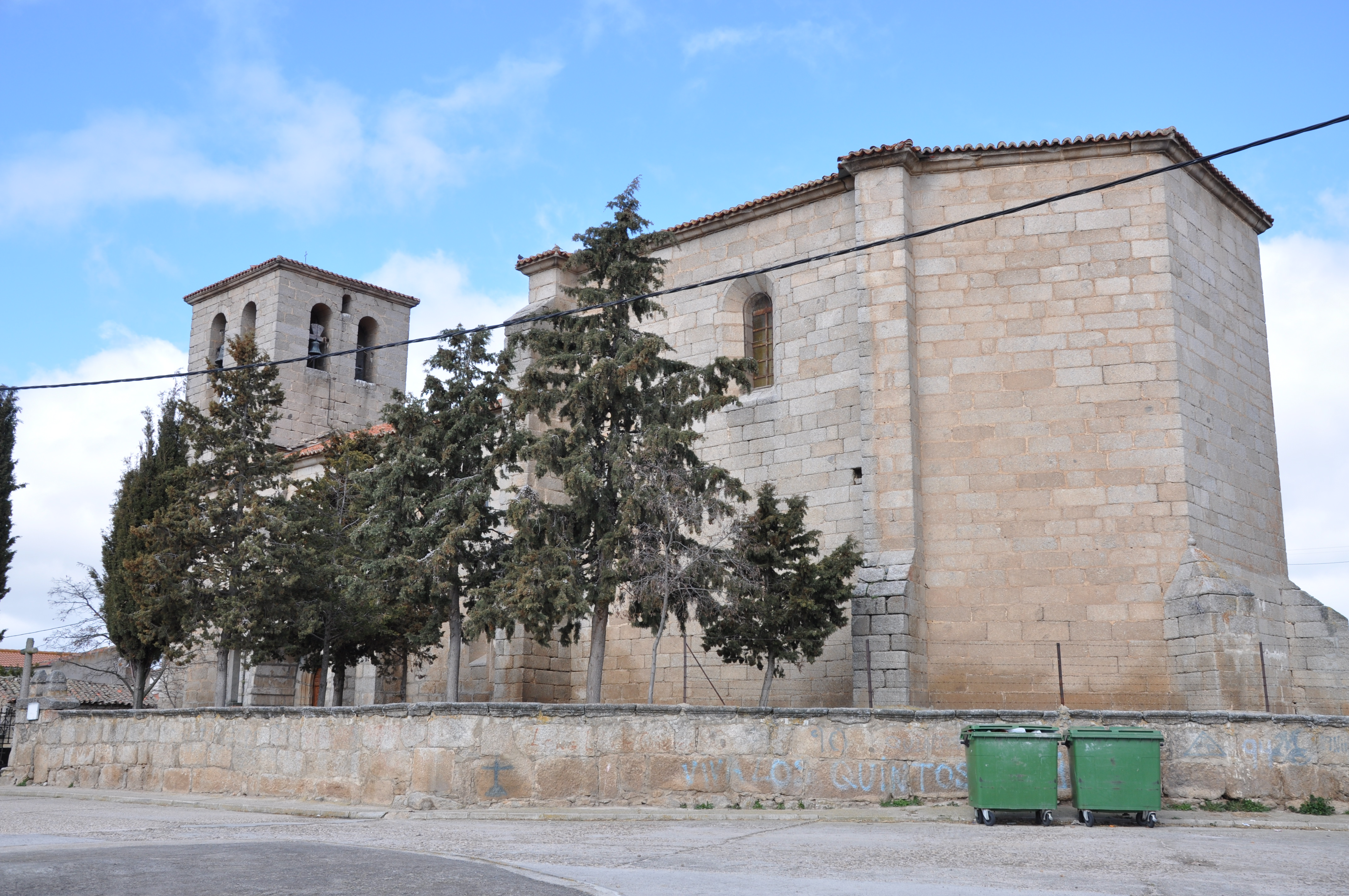
- Parish Church of San Juan Bautista
- Flag Coat of arms
- Location in Spain. Cabezas del Villar (Spain)
- Coordinates: 40°42′55″N 5°12′30″W
- Country: Spain
- Autonomous community: Castile and León
- Province: Ávila
- Municipality: Cabezas del Villar

Area
  - Total: 110.07 km^{2} (42.50 sq mi)
- Elevation: 1,048 m (3,438 ft)

Population (2025-01-01)
  - Total: 217
  - Density: 1.97/km^{2} (5.11/sq mi)
- Time zone: UTC+1 (CET)
  - Summer (DST): UTC+2 (CEST)
- Website: Official website

Cabezas del Villar is a municipality located in the province of Ávila, Castile and León, Spain. According to the 2006 census (INE), the municipality had a population of 399 inhabitants.

== Population ==
Historical population
Year	Pop.	±% p.a.
2023	234	—
2024	224	−4.27%
2025	217	−3.12%
Source: INE
