= Cabezas de Alambre =

- municipality
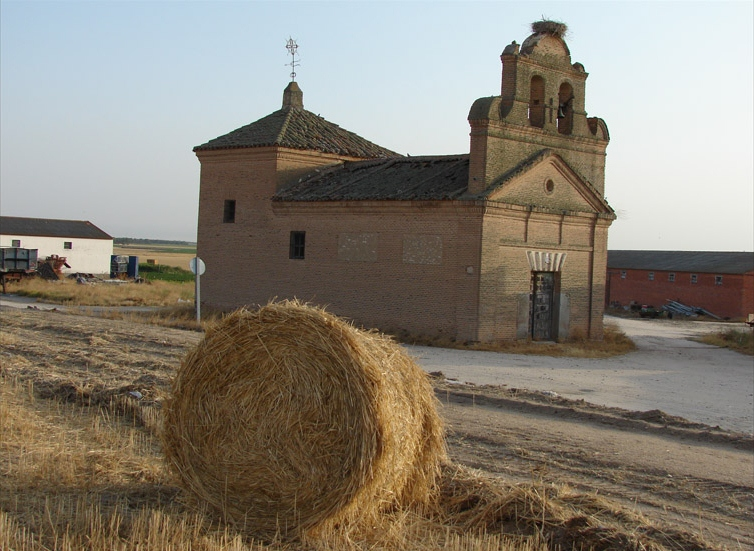
- Hermitage in Cabezas de Alambre

- Flag Coat of arms

- Location in Spain. Cabezas de Alambre (Spain)
- Coordinates: 40°56′25″N 4°50′33″W
- Country: Spain
- Autonomous community: Castile and León
- Province: Ávila
- Municipality: Cabezas de Alambre

Area
  - Total: 11.80 km^{2} (4.56 sq mi)

Population (2025-01-01)
  - Total: 152
  - Density: 12.9/km^{2} (33.4/sq mi)
- Time zone: UTC+1 (CET)
  - Summer (DST): UTC+2 (CEST)
- Website: Official website

Cabezas de Alambre is a municipality located in the province of Ávila, Castile and León, Spain. According to the 2006 census (INE), the municipality had a population of 187 inhabitants.
