= Changüí =

Style of Cuban music

Changüí (Spanish pronunciation: [tʃaŋˈɡwi]) is a style of Cuban music which originated in the early 19th century in the eastern region of Guantánamo Province, specifically Baracoa. It arose in the sugar cane refineries and in the rural communities populated by slaves. Changüí combines the structure and elements of Spain's canción and the Spanish guitar with African rhythms and percussion instruments of African origin. Changüí is considered a predecessor of son montuno (the ancestor of modern salsa), which has enjoyed tremendous popularity in Cuba throughout the 20th century.

Changüí is related to the other regional genres of nengón and kiribá and is descended from nengón. Technically, the changüi ensemble consists of: marímbula, bongos, tres, güiro (or guayo) and one or more singers. Changüi does not use the Cuban key pattern (or guide pattern) known as clave. The tres typically plays offbeat guajeos (ostinatos), while the guayo plays on the beat.

== Gallery ==
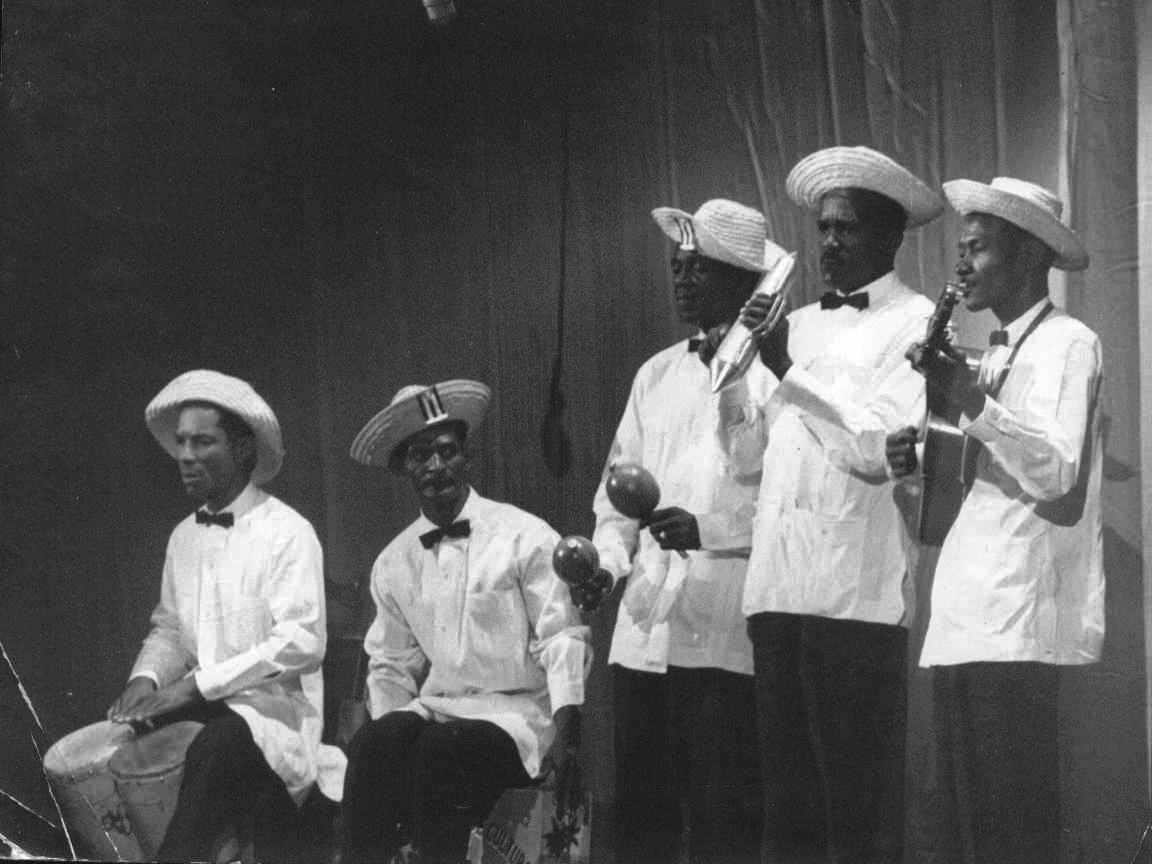
Grupo Changüí de Guantánamo at the National Folk Festival in Havana, 1962.

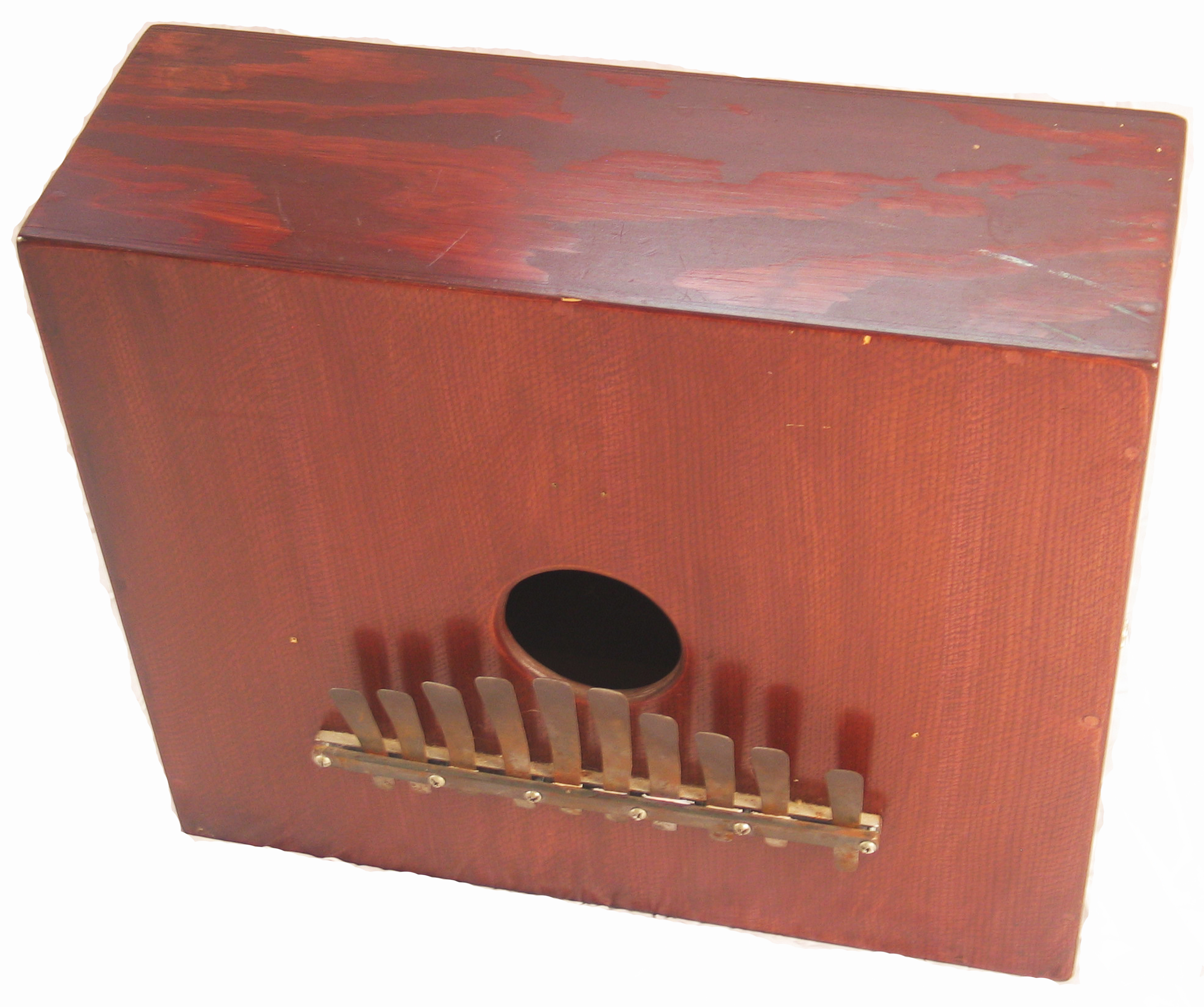
The Afro-Cuban marímbula, the "bass" used in changüí.

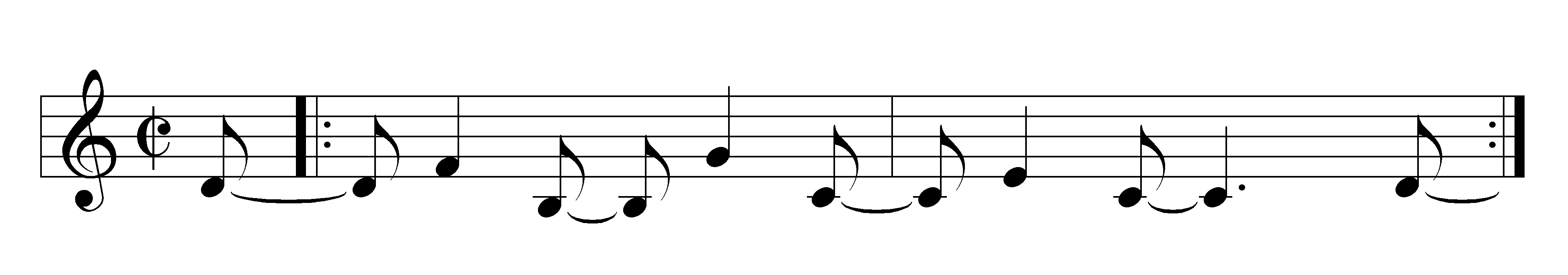
Changüí offbeat guajeo written in cut-time.

Sheet music for a changüí ensemble.
