= Pancho Amat =

Cuban musician (born 1950)

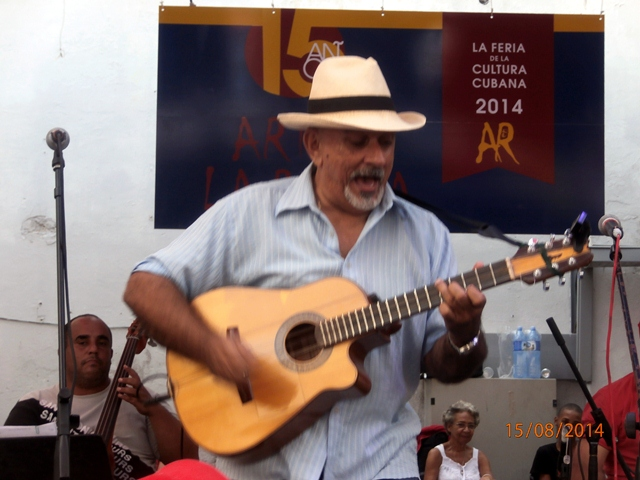

Background information
- Born: Francisco Amat Rodríguez; April 22, 1950; Güira de Melena, Cuba
- Genres: Son cubano, punto cubano, guajira
- Instrument: tres
- Years active: 1971–present

Francisco Amat Rodríguez (born April 22, 1950), better known as Pancho Amat, is a Cuban musician specialized in the tres. In 1971, he became a founding member of Manguaré, which would become one of the leading ensembles within the nueva trova movement. He later played in Adalberto Álvarez y su Son. Currently, he is the leader of his own group, El Cabildo del Son.

In 2010, he won the National Music Award given by the Cuban Music Institute.

== Biography ==
He obtained his degree in pedagogy from the University of Havana in 1971 and studied classical guitar at the Ignacio Cervantes Conservatory. Also in 1971, he founded Grupo Manguaré, which he directed for more than 15 years.

He has workedin trios, quartets, ensembles, charangas, even making arrangements for symphonic orchestra. He has collaborated with artists such as Joaquín Sabina, Oscar D'León, Pablo Milanés, Rosana, Ry Cooder, Silvio Rodríguez, Víctor Víctor, Yomo Toro, and Víctor Jara, and worked with Spanish rocker Santiago Auserón on the Juan Perro project. He has toured the United States, Europe and Japan with different groups of Cuban music.

In 1995, he released Son Por Tres, which won the National Critics' Award at Cubadisco. His second production, De San Antonio a Maisí. was awarded the Best Traditional Music Album Award Cubadisco 2002.

Pancho Amat is a follower in Cuba of the work of famous tres players such as Arsenio Rodríguez.

In November 2012, he was selected for the opening of the sixteenth version of the DR Jazz Festival, along with important figures of the Caribbean strings such as guitarist Juan Francisco Ordóñez and "cuatro player" Pedro Guzmán, among others.
