= Conjunto Chappottín =

Cuban band

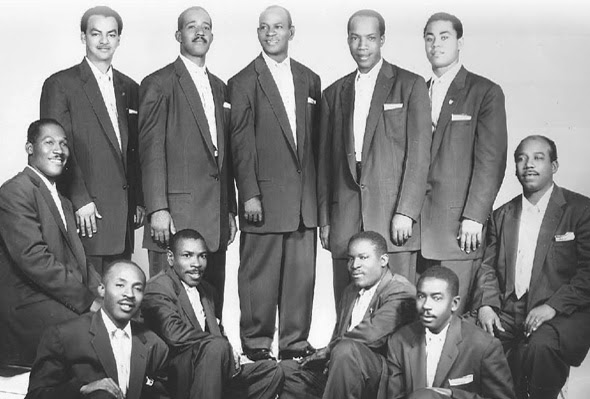
- Conjunto Chappottín in the 1950s

Background information
- Also known as: Chappottín y sus Estrellas
- Origin: Havana, Cuba
- Genres: Son cubano, guaracha, bolero
- Years active: 1950–present
- Labels: Panart, Puchito, Maype, EGREM

Conjunto Chappottín, also known as Chappottín y sus Estrellas, is a Cuban son conjunto from Havana. It was founded in 1950 by trumpeter Félix Chappottín, pianist Lilí Martínez, singer Miguelito Cuní and other members of Arsenio Rodríguez's conjunto, which was partially disbanded after his departure to the US. Currently, the group is directed by Jesús Ángel Chappottín Coto, the grandson of Félix Chappottín.

== History ==
The founding of the band dates back to the 1940s. Its founder Arsenio Rodríguez was one of the country's most renowned band leaders with major influences on the Latin jazz and Salsa music of the next decades. With his Conjunto he was the first to add reed and brass instruments to a Latin band at that time. When Arsenio Rodríguez left Cuba in 1950 to undergo an ophthalmological intervention in New York to treat his eye disease, he handed the musical direction over to his first trumpet player, Félix Chappottín.

The band was renamed Félix Chappottín y su Conjunto Todos Estrellas. The band maintained a large repertoire of Arsenio Rodriguez, adding new pieces by Felix Chappottin and other artists. His son, Angel Chappottin Valdes, was also a trumpeter in the band. Felix Chappottín directed the band successfully until the year of his death in 1983.

From 1983 until the 1990s, his son Angel Chappottín Valdes was musical director. Since then, the grandson of Felix Chappottín, Jesús Ángel Chappottín Coto, trumpeter, has directed the Conjunto Chappottín together Miguelito Cuni Jr., singer, percussionist and son of the former lead singer Miguelito Cuní. Angel Chappottín Valdes played congas with the group after his retirement.

In 2014, Conjunto Chappottín y Sus Estrellas made their first tour of the United States.

In 2017, and under the musical direction of Víctor Agustín Linén Fernández, a record and documentary production was made for the 65th anniversary the Ensemble. The CD-DVD Vivir vivir together with the record company EGREM

== Style ==
The band dedicates to the traditional son with a variety of different stylistic elements such as son-montuno, guajira, guaracha, mambo, danzon, danzonette, charanga, afro-son, bembe, Cuban rumba (made up of yambú, columbia and guaguanco), and cha cha cha.

With the additional horn group Arsenio Rodríguez changed the traditional setting of a son band. Arsenio Rodríguez was one of the most influential Cuban musicians of the last century and had major influences of the development of Salsa and Latin jazz.

Under the direction of Felix Chappottín, the successor of Arsenio Rodríguez and musical director of the band for more than 3 decades, who was often compared with Louis Armstrong, the band gained international reputation.

== Members ==
=== Founding members ===
- Felix Chappottín: trumpet, leader
- Lilí Martínez: piano, arrangements
- Miguelito Cuní: lead vocals
- Arturo "Alambre Dulce" Harvey: tres
- Sabino Peñalver: bass
- Félix "Chocolate" Alfonso: congas
- Antolín Suárez "Papa Kila": bongos
- Pepín Vaillant: trumpet
- Aquilino Valdés: trumpet
- Cecilio Cerviz: trumpet
- Udalberto "Chicho" Fresneda: guitar, vocals
- Carlos Ramírez: guitar, vocals
- Conrado Cepero: vocals
- René Álvarez: vocals

=== Current members ===
- Jesús Ángel Chappottín Coto: trumpet, musical director
- Miguel Arcángel Conill Hernández (Miguelito Cuní Jr.): singer and percussion
- Ángel Remigio Laborí Hernández: piano
- Francisco Vasallo Labrada: tumba
- Eduardo Antonio Canas Oliva: percussion
- Manuel Guará Colás: trumpet
- Gregorio Martínez Pedroso: trumpet
- Roberto Ortega Oviedo: trumpet
- José Lussón Bueno: singer
- Eduardo Font Paniagua: singer
- Eduardo Sandoval Nobregas: singer
- Víctor Agustín Linén Fernández: Tres Cubano and musical director since 2010-2022

== Selected discography ==
- 1991: Conjunto Chappottin
- 1992: Estrellas de Cuba
- 1993: Chappottín y su Conjunto
- 1993: Sabor Tropical
- 1995: Canta Miguelito Cuni
- 1995: Chappotín y sus Estrellas
- 1995: Serie de Oro
- 1997: Que Se Funan
- 1999: Senores del Son
- 1999: Mi son mi son mi son
- 2000: Seguimos Aqui Chappottineando
- 2001: Mariquitas y Chicharrones
- 2001: Havana Social Club
- 2002: La Guarapachanga
- 2003: Son, Boleros y Montuno Con Sabor a Quimbombo
- 2003: Una Nueva Generacion
- 2006: Conjunto Chappottín y Sus Estrellas.
- 2007: Vuelven Los Señores Del Son
- 2017: Vivir, vivir.

== Audiovisual ==
- 2017 Documentary film

Vivir, vivir.

== See also ==
- Estrellas de Chocolate

== Publications ==
- Orovio, Helio (1992). "Diccionario de la Música Cubana". 2da. Edición. La Habana, Editorial Letras Cubanas.
- Orovio, Helio (2004). "Cuban Music from A to Z" Edition B&T, ISBN 0-8223-3212-4
- García, David (2006). "Arsenio Rodríguez and the Transnational Flows of Latin Popular Music", Temple University Press
