= Obdulio Morales =

Cuban pianist, conductor, composer and ethnomusicologist (1910–1981)

- Born: Obdulio Morales Ríos; April 7, 1910; Havana, Cuba
- Died: January 9, 1981 (aged 70) Havana, Cuba
- Genres: Afro-Cuban music
- Occupations: Musician, bandleader, composer, ethnomusicologist
- Instrument: Piano
- Years active: 1922–81
- Labels: Victor, Panart, Puchito, Montilla

Obdulio Morales Ríos (April 7, 1910 – January 9, 1981) was a Cuban pianist, conductor, composer and ethnomusicologist, an important figure in the late afrocubanismo movement. He championed Afro-Cuban music traditions and sponsored artists such as Merceditas Valdés.

== Career ==
=== Early life and career ===
Obdulio Morales Ríos was born in Havana on April 7, 1910. He learned piano from an American teacher and furthered his studies at the conservatory. At age 12 he began to play piano at the silent cinema, and a year later he was playing in private dance parties as a reserve pianist. Around the same time, while working as an apprentice for his father, who was a tailor, he began to attend black societies such as the Club Bohemio. In 1924 he joined the first lineup of Los Hermanos Martínez orchestra.

=== 1930s ===
Composer Obdulio Morales represents a central figure in the dissemination of stylized Afrocuban religious music during the prerevolutionary years.

— Robin Moore, University of Texas

Morales worked for the radio since 1928, specializing in Afro-Cuban music. In 1938 he premiered Batamú in collaboration with musician Julio Chappottín (father of Félix Chappottín) and choreographer Armando Borroto. This show featured famous conguero Chano Pozo and managed to sell out the Teatro Martí. In 1938 he also founded the Grupo Coral Folklórico de Cuba, an ensemble including a symphonic orchestra, Afro-Cuban drums and güiros. The ensemble featured batá master Trinidad Torregrosa, flautist Roberto Ondina and singers such as Candita Batista, Merceditas Valdés and Alfredo León Jr. At the same time, Morales was part of several successful big bands such as the eleven-piece Los Melódicos, an orchestra that he directed by 1939 and also featured Chano Pozo on quinto. He also played in Habana Jazz band and in 1931 Orquesta Elegante, the backing band of danzonete singer Paulina Álvarez.

=== 1940s and 1950s ===
In 1942 the Grupo Coral Folklórico de Cuba became the Conjunto Coral Sinfónico Folklórico de Cuba, and together with Fernando Ortiz he began to give lectures about Afro-Cuban music at the Hispano-Cuban Culture Society and the Society for Afro-Cuban studies. Beginning in 1943, Morales conducted Afro-Cuban music performances on Sundays which were broadcast by Radio Cadena Suaritos.

In the 1950s Morales was responsible for the score of several films including Rincón criollo (1950), Una gitana de La Habana (1950), Sandra, la mujer de fuego (1954) and Yambaó (1957). In 1955, Morales was the conductor in Ñáñigo, an LP by Puerto Rican singer Ruth Fernández with a repertoire of classics by Moisés Simons, Ernesto Lecuona, Eliseo Grenet and Gilberto Valdés.

=== Late career and death ===
During the 1960s, Morales conducted a late night program at Radio Rebelde featuring vocalist Gina Martín. He also became the director and arranger of Antobal's Cuban All-Stars. In 1972 he became the director of Conjunto Folklórico Nacional de Cuba's orchestra, with which he toured Europe. He continued his research into Afro-Cuban culture, giving talks and collaborating with Zoila Lapique Becali on a study on Cuban music publishing between 1829 and 1902. In 1980, while retired and ill, he founded Afrofónico, another Afro-Cuban music group.

Obdulio Morales died in Havana on January 9, 1981.
