= Merceditas Valdés =

Cuban singer (1922–1996)

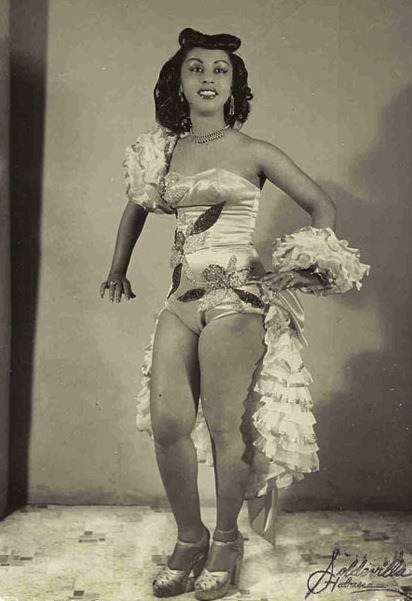

Background information
- Also known as: La Pequeña Aché de Cuba
- Born: Mercedes Valdés Granit; September 24, 1922; Havana, Cuba
- Died: June 13, 1996 (aged 73) Havana, Cuba
- Genres: Santería music, afro
- Occupation: Musician
- Instrument: Vocals
- Years active: 1949–1996
- Labels: Victor, Panart, SMC, Puchito, EGREM, RMM

Mercedes Valdés Granit (Note: In this name that follows Hispanic American naming customs, the first or paternal surname is Valdés and the second or maternal family name is Granit.) (September 24, 1922 – June 13, 1996), better known as Merceditas Valdés, was a Cuban singer who specialized in Afro-Cuban traditional music. Under the aegis of ethnomusicologists Fernando Ortiz and Obdulio Morales, Valdés helped popularize Afro-Cuban music throughout Latin America. In 1949, she became one of the first female Santería singers to be recorded. Her debut album was released at the start of the 1960s, when the Cuban government nationalized the record industry. She then went on hiatus before making a comeback in the 1980s with a series of albums entitled Aché, in collaboration with artists such as Frank Emilio Flynn and rumba ensemble Yoruba Andabo. She also appeared in Jane Bunnett's Spirits of Havana and continued performing until her death in 1996.

== Life and career ==
=== Early life ===
Valdés was born in Cayo Hueso, Centro Habana, on September 24 (Día de las Mercedes), 1922. (Note: Some sources incorrectly cite her birth date as either September 24 or October 14, 1928.) Her father was Ángel Valdés, known as Angelito "El Dichoso" (The Lucky One), a musician in Ignacio Piñeiro's influential rumba ensemble Los Roncos. Unlike her mother, her father did not want his daughter to become a musician, so Merceditas started her career as a nun in the black congregation Hermanas Oblatas de la Providencia. However, she soon began to stand out as a singer, winning several prizes awarded by the radio show Corte Suprema del Arte, where she sang songs such as "Babalú" by Margarita Lecuona. She then joined the orchestra of pianist and musicologist Obdulio Morales thanks to his sisters, who lived with Valdés at the congregation. With Morales, Valdés gained exposure due to their performances which were broadcast by Radio Cadena Suaritos on Sundays. In 1944, she met musicologist Fernando Ortiz, one of the main exponents of the Afrocubanismo movement, who employed Valdés in his lectures about Afro-Cuban culture to exemplify the African heritage (especially Yoruba) of Cuban music. Thus, Valdés became an akpwón, a Santería singer, which earned her the nickname La Pequeña Aché de Cuba, given to her by Ortiz.

=== First recordings and rise to fame ===
Valdés made her first recordings of Santería music in April 1949 for Victor. She sang in the same sessions as Evelia Collazo, another female akpwón and the mother of percussionist Julito Collazo. The recordings were credited to Grupo Afro-Cubano. In 1951, Valdés sang in the Rapsodia negra show directed by Enrique González Mántici at the CMQ radio station. During the early 1950s, Valdés recorded more Santería tunes with the so-called Coro Yoruba y Tambores Batá, an ensemble directed by batá drummer Jesús Pérez and featuring other drummers such as Virgilio Ramírez, Trinidad Torregrosa and Carlos Aldama, as well as other singers: Celia Cruz, Caridad Suárez and Eugenio de la Rosa. They recorded several songs for Panart, appearing in the 1954 LP Santero. She also recorded two EPs for SMC (New York City's Spanish Music Center): Cantos oriundos lucumí (Vols. 1 & 2).

Apart from recording, Valdés took part in several tours, some with Ernesto Lecuona's company, performing in Venezuela among other Latin American countries. In 1954, she sang "Ogguere" and "Bembé" with Gilberto Valdés' orchestra at Carnegie Hall. In Cuba, she became the star of the Zun Zun Danbaé show at the Cabaret Sans Souci. She then worked at the Tropicana Club. In 1957, Valdés appeared in the Afro-Cuban themed film Yambaó. In the late 1950s she married famed timbalero Guillermo Barreto.

After the Cuban Revolution, the commercialization of Afro-Cuban music was restricted. Nonetheless, Valdés managed to make several recordings in the early 1960s before effectively halting her recording career. In 1959, she recorded her debut album, which comprised one side of secular Afro-Cuban music, recorded in collaboration with Los Bucaneros under the direction of Rafael Somavilla and Adolfo Guzmán, and one side of religious Santería music featuring Jesús Pérez and his group, Isupo Irawo (a new incarnation of the Coro Yoruba y Tambores Batá). The recordings were made at the former Panart studios and later released by Panart Nacionalizada when the label was taken over by the Cuban government. Between 1959 and 1960, she recorded with percussionist Mongo Santamaría. In 1960 and 1961, she recorded carnival music with Alberto Zayas for Impresora Cubana de Discos (ICD). She then recorded two singles with Los Papines for the newly established EGREM.

=== Late career and death ===
Valdés resumed her recording career in 1982 with the recording of Aché for Siboney, an imprint of EGREM. The album featured again Isupo Irawo and Los Amigos (an ensemble directed by pianist Frank Emilio Flynn and featuring Guillermo Barreto). Several LPs followed: Aché II (1988), Aché III (1989), Aché IV (1990) and Aché V (1993), the latter two in collaboration with Yoruba Andabo. In 1988, she toured Spain and Canada with Sergio Vitier's Grupo Oru. In 1989, she sang in Cubanísimo, an album of classic Cuban recordings presented as medleys under the direction of Andrés Alén and Ramón Huerta, and featuring Guillermo Barreto and Jacqueline Castellanos among others. The album was released in 1990 by EGREM (Cuba) and Fonomusic (Spain). In 1991, she sang in Jane Bunnett's Spirits of Havana, one of the last recordings featuring Guillermo Barreto. She also appeared in Bunnett's Chamalongo, released in 1997.

Merceditas Valdés died on June 13, 1996, aged 73, in her hometown of Havana, almost five years after the death of her husband. Her last album, Ache V, which had only been available in cassette format, was re-released in 1998 by Ralph Mercado under the title Merceditas Valdés with her Big Band - The Final Recordings.

== Awards and honors ==
- 1996: UNESCO Picasso Medal and Diploma of Merit

== Discography ==
LPs

- 1954: Santero (Panart) – with others under the direction of Facundo Rivero
- 1960: Merceditas Valdés (Panart Nacionalizada) – with Los Bucaneros
- 1961: Carnaval 1960-61 (ICD) – with others under the direction of Carlos Ansa
- 1982: Aché (EGREM)
- 1988: Aché II (EGREM)
- 1989: Orishas: Aché III (EGREM)
- 1990: Cubanísimo (EGREM/Fonomusic) – with others under the direction of Andrés Alén and Ramón Huerta
- 1990: Aché IV (EGREM) – with Yoruba Andabo
- 1993: Aché V (EGREM) – with Yoruba Andabo

Singles & EPs

- 195x: Canto oriundo lucumí (1 & 2) (SMC)
- 1957: "Er día que nací yo" / "Ya me cansé" (Puchito)
- 1960: "Una pena" / "Vida, mi delirio es quererte" (Panart Nacionalizada)
- 1961: "A coger la guampara" (INC)
- 1961: "Ochún" / "Yemayá" (INC)
- 1964: Rezos yorubas (EGREM)
- 1964: "Invocación a Elegua y a Changó" / "Tasca-Tasca" (EGREM)
- 1964: "Muriéndome de risa" / "Devuélveme el coco" (EGREM)
