= Álbum de la Revolución Cubana =

Compilation album by Various artists

Álbum de la Revolución Cubana is a publication on the history of the Cuban Revolution. It consists of two parts: comic book and music CD.

== Álbum de la Revolución Cubana Comic Trading Card ==
This comic book is released circa 1960s.

The stamps in the book are about the actors and events from the Cuban Revolution

== Álbum de la Revolución Cubana Music ==
This album is released in 2000 by Cuba Soul. It consists of fifteen Cuban propaganda songs in a danceable Latin rhythm, including the famous song from Carlos Puebla, "Hasta siempre", written after Che Guevara's departure to Bolivia.

1. Celeste Mendoza – Cuba corazón de nuestra América
2. Celina González y Reutilio – Décimas de la Revolución
3. Esther Borja – Despertar
4. Merceditas Valdés – A coger la guampara
5. Celina González y Reutilio – Que viva Fidel
6. Las D'aida – El cohete americano
7. Pío Leyva – Rumba de mi patria
8. Carlos Puebla – Hasta siempre
9. Amelita Frades – Pensamiento
10. Ramón Veloz – Nueva vida
11. Esther Borja – Dejame estrechar tu mano
12. Ojedita Y Coro – La canción de los niños
13. Niño Rivera – Nuevo son
14. Omara Portuondo – Junto a mi fusil mi son
15. Ela Calvo y Orquesta Aragón with Los Papines – Cuba, qué linda es Cuba
