= History of Santería =

Santería is an Afro-Cuban religion that arose in the 19th century.

== Enslavement ==
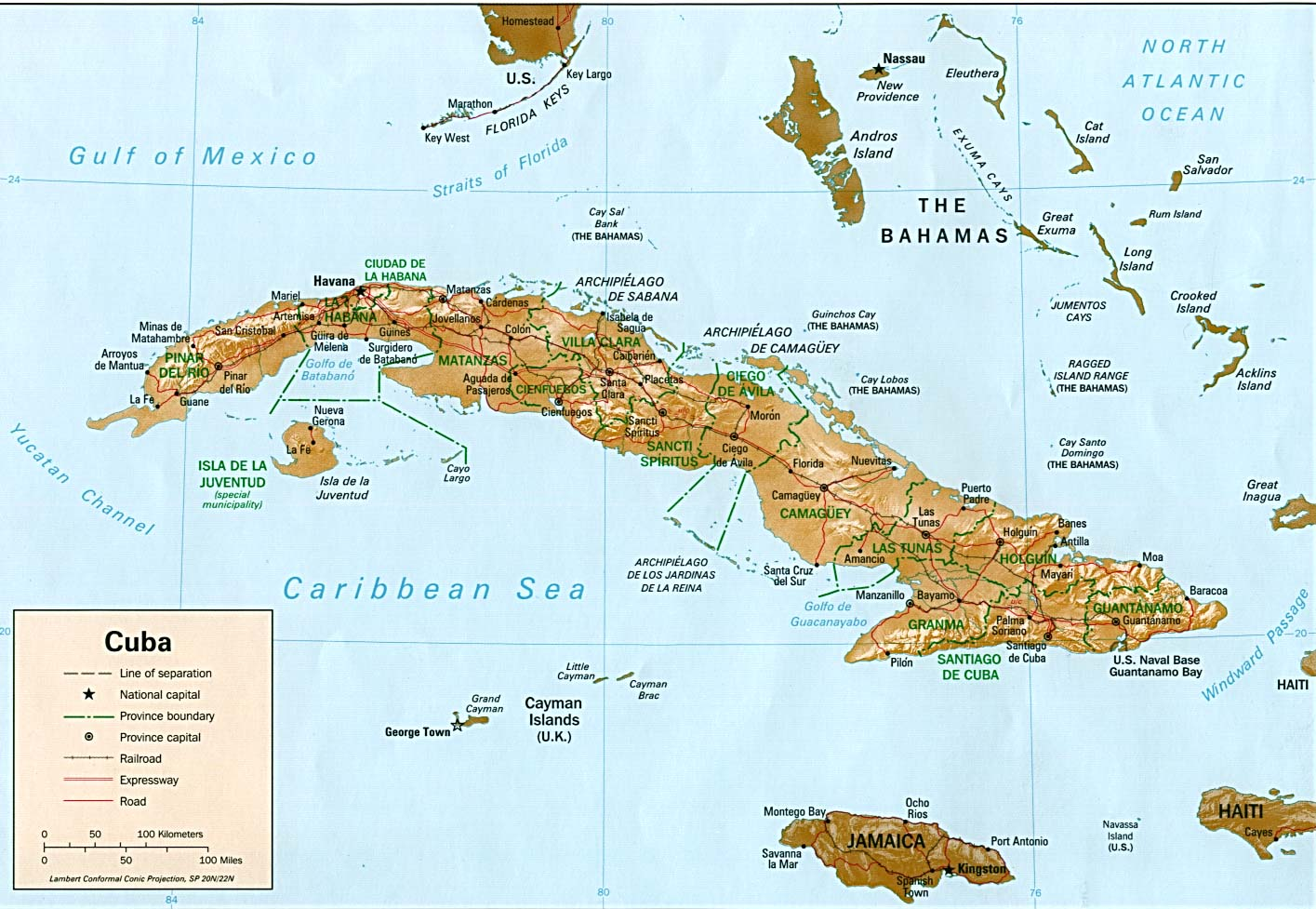
Cuba, the Caribbean island from which Santería originates

After the Spanish Empire conquered Cuba, the island's indigenous Taino and Ciboney saw their populations dramatically decline. The Spanish colonialists established sugar, tobacco, and coffee plantations on Cuba and turned to the purchase of slaves sold at West African ports as a new source of labor for these plantations. Slavery was then active in Spain, and was also widespread in West Africa, where those captured in war or deemed guilty of severe crimes were commonly condemned to enslavement. Enslaved Africans first arrived on Cuba in 1511. Once there, they were divided into groups termed naciones (nations), often based on their West African port of embarkation rather than their own ethno-cultural background; those who were Yoruba speakers, as well as Arara and Ibo people, were commonly identified as the "Lucumí nation". The United Kingdom had abolished slavery in the early 19th century and from the 1820s began patrolling the West African coast to prevent further shipments of slaves to the Americas. The trade nevertheless continued clandestinely, with Cuba continuing to receive new slaves until at least 1860. Full emancipation occurred on Cuba in 1886.

Between 702,000 and 1 million enslaved Africans were brought to Cuba. The majority arrived in the 19th century, in the wake of the late 18th century sugar boom. Most came from a stretch of Western Africa between the modern nation-states of Guinea and Angola. The great plurality were Yoruba, from the area encompassed by the modern states of Nigeria and Benin; the Yoruba had a shared language and culture but were divided among different states. Most adhered to a complex system of belief and ritual, now known as Yoruba traditional religion, that had developed among the Yoruba city-states. Much orisha worship was rooted in localised tradition, however certain orisha were worshipped widely, due in part to the extent and influence of the Yoruba-led Oyo Empire. Enslaved West Africans brought their traditional religion with them to Cuba; some were from the priestly class and possessed knowledge of traditions such as Ifá.

In Cuba, these traditions adapted to the new social conditions of the enslaved population. While hundreds of orisha were worshipped across West Africa, fewer than twenty came to play a prominent role in Santería; this may be because many orisha were rooted in kin-based cults and thus were lost when traditional kinship networks and families were destroyed through enslavement. Oricha associated with the protection of agriculture also ceased to remain part of practices in Cuba, probably because enslaved Afro-Cubans had little reason to protect the harvests owned by the slave-owners. Many of the myths associated with the oricha were transformed in Cuba, creating kinship relationships between different oricha which were not present in traditional West African mythologies. Over time, the imported traditional African religions transformed into Santería, a Cuban tradition that was evident by the end of the 19th century.

In Spanish Cuba, Roman Catholicism was the only religion that could be practiced legally. The Roman Catholic Church in Cuba made efforts to convert the enslaved Africans, but the instruction in Roman Catholicism provided to the latter was typically perfunctory and sporadic. Many Spanish slave-owners were uninterested in having their slaves receive Christian instruction, concerned that allowing the slaves to observe religious holidays or Sunday services would be detrimental to productivity. Most Roman Catholic priests were located in urban areas, away from the majority of the enslaved population who worked on rural plantations.

In Cuba, traditional African religions continued to be practiced within clubs and fraternal organizations made up of African migrants and their descendants. The most important of these were the cabildos de nación, associations modelled on Europe's cofradias which were sponsored by the Church and which the establishment regarded as a means of controlling the Afro-Cuban population. These operated as mutual aid societies and organised communal feasts, dances, and carnivals. Cuba's Roman Catholic Church saw these groups as a method for gradual evangelisation, through which they tolerated the practice of some African customs while stamping out those they most fiercely objected to. It was within the cabildos that syncretism between Roman Catholicism and African traditional religions took place, and where Santería probably first developed. Members identified traditional African deities with Roman Catholic figures such as Jesus Christ, the Virgin Mary, and the saints, believing that these entities would assist people in their daily lives in return for offerings.

From 1790, Cuba's government increased restrictions on the cabildos. However, during the nineteenth century, their functions and membership expanded. In 1882 a new regulation was passed requiring each cabildo to obtain a new license to operate each year, and in 1884 they were prohibited from practicing on Christmas Eve or January 6. In 1888, the law forbade "old style" cabildos, after which many of these groups went underground, becoming some of the early casas de santo. Over time, various individuals of non-African descent also converted to Santería. Formally, these individuals were considered Roman Catholics, but their involvement in Roman Catholicism rarely extended beyond an initial baptism.

== After enslavement ==
After slavery was abolished in Cuba there was a renewed push for independence from the Spanish Empire, an idea promoted by Cuban nationalists who emphasized cultural assimilation of the island's various ethnic groups to create a united sense of 'Cuban-ness'. While the country's Creole socio-economic elite sought to fuse different ethnic identities, they still expressed anxieties about the potential Africanisation of Cuba. After independence, Afro-Cubans remained largely excluded from economic and political power, while negative stereotypes about them remained pervasive throughout the Euro-Cuban population. Afro-Cuban religious practices were often referred to as brujería ('witchcraft') and linked to criminality in the popular imagination.

Although religious freedom was enshrined in the Cuban constitution and Santería was never legislated against, throughout the first half of the 20th century various campaigns were launched against it. In 1876 a law was passed banning the Abakuá fraternal society, an Afro-Cuban religious group which had become widely associated with criminal activity. These were often encouraged by the press, who promoted allegations that white children were being abducted and murdered in Santería rituals; this reached a fever pitch in 1904 after two white children were murdered in Havana in cases that investigators speculated were linked to brujería. The final decades of the 19th century had also seen growing interest in Spiritism, a religion based on the ideas of French writer Allan Kardec, which in Cuba proved particularly popular among the white peasantry, the Creole class, and the small urban middle-class. Ideas from Spiritism increasingly filtered into and influenced Santería.

One of the first intellectuals to examine Santería was the lawyer and ethnographer Fernando Ortiz, who discussed it in his 1906 book Los negros brujos (The Black Witchdoctors). He saw it as a barrier to the social integration of Afro-Cubans into broader Cuban society and recommended that it be suppressed. In the 1920s, there were efforts to incorporate elements of Afro-Cuban culture into a broader understanding of Cuban culture, such as through the afrocubanismo literary and artistic movement. These often drew upon Afro-Cuban music, dance, and mythology, but typically rejected Santería rituals themselves. In May 1936, Ortiz sponsored the first ethnographic conference on Santería music. In 1942, Rómula Lachatañeré's Manuel de santería was published, representing the first scholarly attempt to understand Santería as a religion; in contrast to Ortiz, he maintained that the tradition should be seen as a religious system as opposed to a form of witchcraft. Lachatañeré was instrumental in promoting the term "Santería" in reference to the phenomenon, deeming it a more neutral description that the pejorative-laden terms such as brujería which were commonly used.

== In Cuba and the diaspora: 1959–present ==
=== Marxist-Leninist policies ===
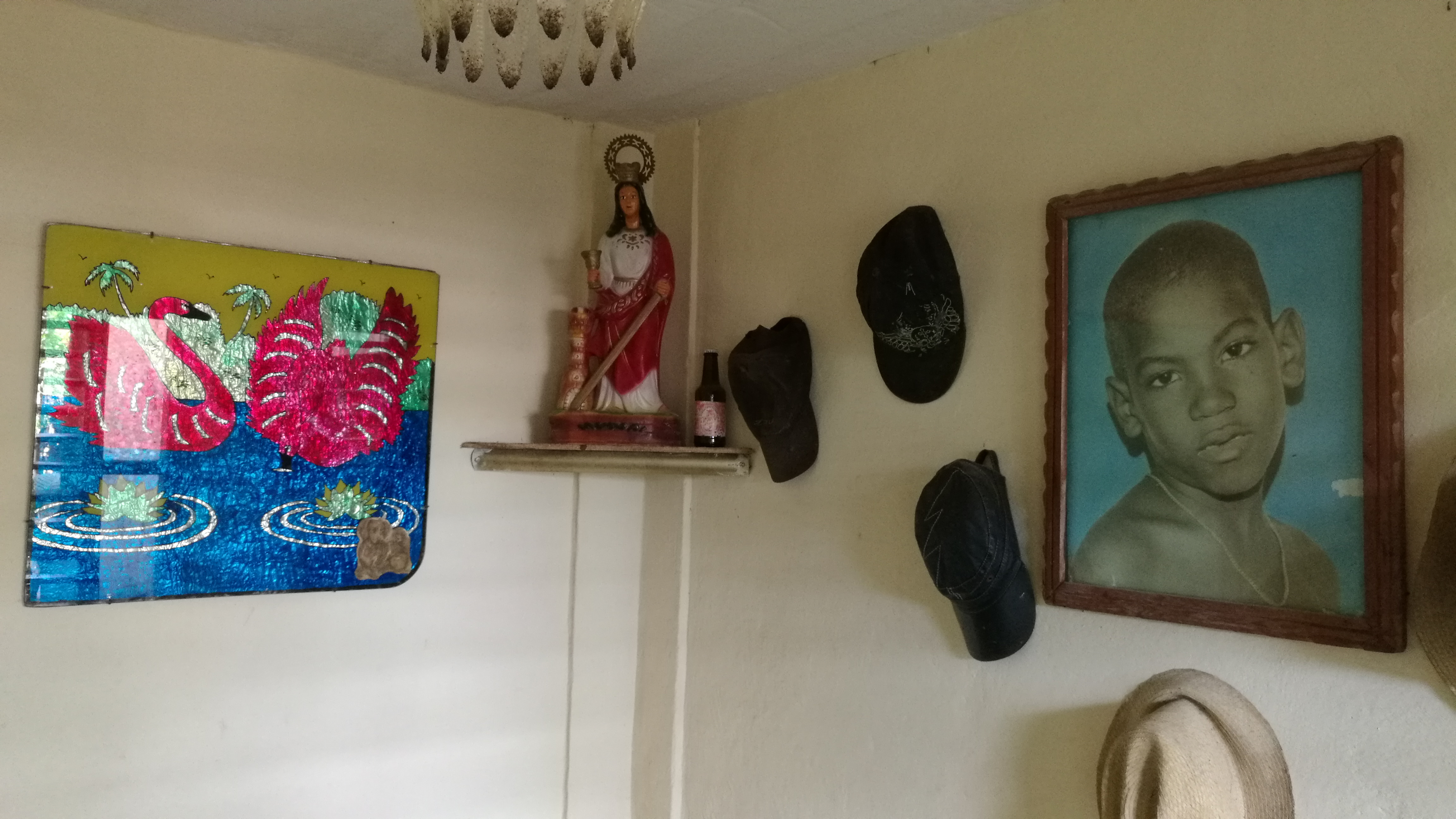
A statue of Santa Barbara on the wall of a home in Mantilla, Havana; this saint is often linked with the oricha Chango

The Cuban Revolution of 1959 resulted in the island becoming a Marxist–Leninist state governed by Fidel Castro's Communist Party of Cuba. Much of the Afro-Cuban population was supportive of Castro's new administration, believing that they had the most to gain from the change. This administration espoused an expressly anti-racist position while retaining previous governments' focus on cultural integration rather than stressing and encouraging cultural difference among Cuba's ethnic groups. Castro's government saw any emphasis on a separate Afro-Cuban identity as being counter-revolutionary. Like other Marxist–Leninist states, it was committed to state atheism and to the ultimate eradication of religion, resulting in the government taking a negative view of Santería. Practitioners continued to experience police harassment through to the 1980s, were denied membership of the Communist Party, and faced limited employment opportunities. Santería practitioners required police permission to perform rituals, permission which was sometimes denied.

In 1982, Cuba's government established the Departmento de Estudios Sociorreligiosos (Department of Socio-Religious Studies, DESR), which investigated Santería from a Marxist perspective, largely portraying the religion as a primitive survival of animism and magic. The DESR research found that while Christianity had declined in Cuba since 1959, Santería had not. Partly this was because the increased employment among Cubans following the revolution had allowed more individuals to afford the initiation fees. While taking a negative view of Santería, the state sought to adopt and promote many of the art forms associated with it in the hope of secularizing them and using them in the promotion of a unified Cuban identity.

Following the collapse of the Soviet Union, at which Cuba lost its main source of international support, Castro's government declared that the country was entering a "Special Period" in which new economic measures would be necessary. In these years it selectively supported various traditional Afro-Cuban customs and traditions and legalised certain Santería practices. These measures were partly linked to a desire to boost tourism, with Santería-focused tourism being called santurismo. Afro-Cuban floor shows became common in Cuban hotels. Priests of Santería, Ifá, and Palo Monte all took part in government-sponsored tours for foreigners desiring initiation into such traditions. In 1991, the Cuban Communist Party approved the admission of religious members, and in 1992 the constitution was amended to declare Cuba a secular rather than an atheist state. The government's move away from the state atheism it previously espoused allowed Santería to leave behind the marginalisation it had faced, and throughout the 1990s Santería began to be practiced more openly in Cuba.

=== Growing Yorubization and transnational activity ===
The Cuban Revolution generated an exodus of many Cubans, who settled in other parts of the Americas, especially the United States, Puerto Rico, Mexico, Colombia, and Venezuela. Although initial waves of migrants were predominantly white and middle-class, by the Mariel boatlift exodus of the 1980s the migrants included larger numbers of Afro-Cubans. Santeria gained an interest among Cuban exiles as a Cuban cultural outlet exiles could find comfort in while living outside of Cuba. As well as being a Cuban religion that is less dogmatic and institutionalized than Catholicism.

With an increased Cuban presence in the U.S., Santería began to grow in many large U.S. cities, where it was embraced both by Latino Americans but also European Americans and African Americans. For many African Americans, it was seen as a more authentically African religion than others available to them, especially when purged of European-derived Roman Catholic elements. For some of these individuals, it became a religious wing of the Black Power movement. During the mid-1960s, several African American practitioners established the Yoruba Temple of Harlem.

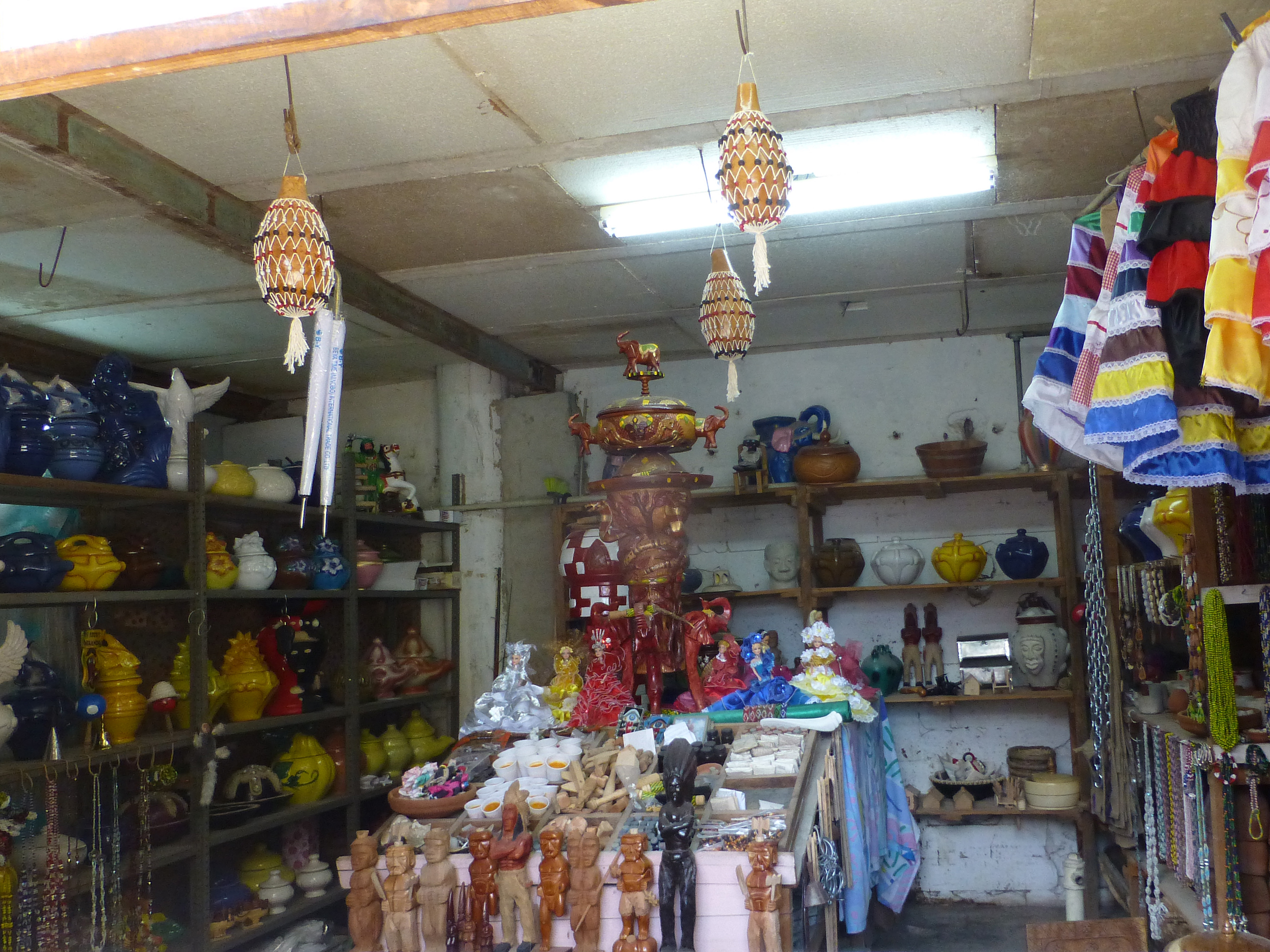
A shop in Havana selling paraphernalia associated with Santería

In the second half of the twentieth century, there was a growing awareness among santeros/santeras of the trans-national links that their religion had with other orisha-worshipping belief systems in West Africa and the Americas. This was accompanied by growing contact with other orisha-worshippers elsewhere. Collectively, these different movements were increasingly described as the "Orisha Tradition." This process was partly influenced by the 1957 visit to Cuba of the French photographer and ethnographer Pierre Verger, who promoted a pan-Yoruba theology. These transnational links were reinforced when the Ooni of Ife, a prominent Yoruba political and religious leader, visited Cuba in 1987. Cuba's government permitted the formation of the Yoruba Cultural Association, a non-governmental organization, in the early 1990s. In July 2003, Havana hosted the Eighth World Orisha Conference. Various practitioners of Santería made visits to Nigeria to study traditional Yoruba religion there.

The late twentieth century saw a growth in the yorubización ('Yorubization') of Santería, with attempts made to remove Roman Catholic elements from the religion and make it more closely resemble West African religion. This process was promoted at the International Workshop of Yoruba Culture, which was held in Cuba in 1992. Within Cuba, the Yorubization process was often attributed as reflecting the influence of practitioners in the United States. Cuban cultural nationalists were critical of the Yorubization process, viewing Santería's syncretism as a positive trait and arguing that advocates of Yorubization presented homogenous societies as superior to heterogenous ones. Many Santeros who opposed the reforms highlighted that even in West Africa, orisha-worship never foregrounded ideas of purity and exclusivity. The head of the Roman Catholic Church in Cuba, Cardinal Jaime Lucas Ortega y Alamino, also opposed the Yorubization process, believing that the Roman Catholic elements of Santería were a positive influence within the religion. The close of the twentieth century also saw adherents of Santería increasingly utilise the internet to promote the religion.
