= Pancho Quinto =

- Birth name: Francisco Hernández Mora
- Born: April 23, 1933; Havana, Cuba
- Died: February 11, 2005 (aged 71); Havana, Cuba
- Genres: Cuban rumba, guaguancó, guarapachangueo, batá-rumba, Abakuá music
- Occupation(s): Musician, dockworker
- Instrument(s): Quinto, batá, cajón
- Years active: 1947–2005
- Labels: Round World, Riverboat
- Formerly of: Guaracheros de Regla, Sonora Matancera, Yoruba Andabo

Francisco Hernández Mora (April 23, 1933 – February 11, 2005), better known as Pancho Quinto, was a Cuban rumba percussionist and teacher. He was the founder of Yoruba Andabo and one of the "godfathers" of the guarapachangueo style of Cuban rumba. His solo career began in the 1990s after he gained international attention through his collaborations with Jane Bunnett and other artists.

== Life and career ==
=== Early years ===
Francisco Hernández Mora was born on April 23, 1933, in Belén, a neighbourhood in Havana. Between the ages of 12 and 14, he joined the comparsa Los Dandys, where he was given the name Pancho Quinto. Aged 14, Quinto went to work with his father to the docks, where he would come into contact with important figures in the world of rumba, as well as the Abakuá society. He was taught batá drumming by two of the instrument's masters: Pablo Roche and Jesús Pérez.

=== Professional career and rise to fame ===
In the first half of the 1950s, he played in Los Componedores de Batea and Los Guaracheros de Regla, as well as in the groups of batá drummers Francico Bautista, José Fernández "Pito", and Jesús Pérez. Quinto then briefly joined La Sonora Matancera, who at the time featured Celia Cruz as lead singer. While playing at the Tropicana Club in Las D'Aida's backing band, he declined Jesús Pérez's invitation to join the Conjunto Folklórico National in order to continue working at the docks. In 1961, he became one of the founding members of Guaguancó Marítimo Portuario, an amateur rumba group from the Havana docks.

In 1981 Guaguancó Marítimo Portuario became Yoruba Andabo, a professional rumba group that incorporated Quinto's rhythmic ideas for batá and cajón (wooden box) into a style known as guarapachangueo (pioneered in the 1970s by Los Chinitos). Yoruba Andabo's popularity increased throughout the decade, gaining exposure with the 1986 documentary El país de los oricha. The band gained international attention after their involvement in Jane Bunnett's album Spirits of Havana (recorded in 1991 and released in 1993), which was followed by the release of their 1993 album El callejón de los rumberos in North America in 1996. In addition, Quinto became known to American percussionists through his disciple Orlando "Puntilla" Ríos, who emigrated to the US in the 1980s.

=== Later years and death ===
Around 1997 Quinto left Yoruba Andabo to record his first solo album En el solar la cueva del humo and continued collaborating with Jane Bunnett and other artists. He was featured in Caravana Cubana's second album, Del alma, in 2002. His second album, Rumba sin fronteras, was released in 2003. Quinto recorded a third solo album in Toronto that remains unreleased.

Pancho Quinto died on February 11, 2005, in Havana.

== Discography ==
Solo albums

- 1998: En el solar la cueva del humo (Round World)
- 2003: Rumba sin fronteras (Riverboat)

With Jane Bunnett

- Spirits of Havana (Messidor, 1993)
- Chamalongo (Blue Note, 1998)
- Ritmo & Soul (Blue Note, 2000)
- Cuban Odyssey (Blue Note, 2003)

With Caravana Cubana

- Del alma (Dreamer, 2002)

With Yoruba Andabo

- El callejón de los rumberos (EGREM, 1993)
