= Yoruba Andabo =

- Origin: Havana, Cuba
- Genres: Rumba
- Years active: 1981–present
- Past members: Pancho Quinto

Yoruba Andabo is a Cuban rumba ensemble founded in 1981 by conga drummer Pancho Quinto. It evolved from an amateur group known as Guaguancó Marítimo Portuario, established in 1961 in the docks of Havana. Together with Los Chinitos, Yoruba Andabo is one of the leading exponents of the guarapachangueo style of Cuban rumba, which incorporated Quinto's rhythmic ideas for batá and cajón (wooden box).

Yoruba Andabo's popularity increased throughout the 1980s, gaining exposure with the 1986 documentary El país de los oricha. The band gained international attention after their involvement in Jane Bunnett's album Spirits of Havana (recorded in 1991 and released in 1993), which was followed by the release of their 1993 album El callejón de los rumberos in North America in 1996. In 1995 they recorded Aché IV with Merceditas Valdés.

Around 1997 Quinto left Yoruba Andabo to record his first solo album En el solar la cueva del humo and continued collaborating with Jane Bunnett and other artists until his death in 2005. Meanwhile, Yoruba Andabo continued performing and making recordings. In 2005, they released Rumba en la Habana. Their latest albums are El espíritu de la rumba (2013), Soy de la tierra brava (2016) and Seguimos sonando (2021).

== Members ==
Period	Members	Performances
1960s – 70s	Juan Campos "Chan" – singer; Calixto Callava – singer; Miguel Chappottín – singer; Pancho Quinto – drummer; Jacinto Scull "Chori" – drummer	amateur gigs as Grupo Marítimo Portuario Zona 5
1981	Juan Campos "Chan" – singer; Calixto Callava – singer; Guillermo Triana "El Negro" – singer; Pedro Fariñas – singer; Pancho Quinto – drummer; Jacinto Scull "Chori" – drummer; Justo Marino García – drummer; Julio César Lemoine "El Gordo" – drummer; "El Quimbo" – drummer	first professional gig, unnamed group
1982 – 1989	Geovani del Pino – director, singer, percussionist; Juan Campos "Chan" – singer; Calixto Callava – singer; Guillermo Triana "El Negro" – singer; Pedro Fariñas – singer; Rolando Rodríguez "Malanga" – arranger, singer, percussionist; Pancho Quinto – drummer; Jacinto Scull "Chori" – drummer; Justo Marino García – drummer; Orlando Lage "Palito" – drummer; Ricardo Campos "Siqui" – drummer	residence at Peña del Ambia in Havana; gigs as Yoruba Andabo from 1985; Cajones bullangueros album recorded at EICTV in summer 1989 (unpublished)
1990 – 1996	Geovani del Pino – director, singer, percussionist; Juan Campos "Chan" – singer; Miguel Chappottín – singer; Rolando Rodríguez "Malanga" – arranger, singer, percussionist; Pancho Quinto – drummer; Jacinto Scull "Chori" – drummer; Justo Marino García – drummer; Orlando Lage "Palito" – drummer; Ricardo Campos "Siqui" – drummer; Román Díaz – drummer	Spirits of Havana album recorded with Jane Bunnett in Havana in 1991; El callejón de los rumberos album recorded in Havana in August 1993; Aché IV album recorded with Merceditas Valdés in Havana in 1995
1997	Geovani del Pino – director, singer, percussionist; Juan Campos "Chan" – singer; Miguel Chappottín – singer; Jesús Peñalver "Cusito" – singer; Rolando Rodríguez "Malanga" – arranger, singer, percussionist; Justo Marino García – drummer; Orlando Lage "Palito" – drummer; Román Díaz – drummer; Agustín Banguela "Chinchilla" – drummer	Del Yoruba al son album recorded in Havana in 1997
2004	Geovani del Pino – director, singer, percussionist; Juan Campos "Chan" – singer; Miguel Chappottín – singer; Regla Monet – singer; Felipe Abreu – singer; Orlando Lage "Palito" – drummer; Julio César Lemoine "El Gordo" – drummer; Juan Carlos Sierra – drummer; Pedro Isidro Medina – drummer; Francisco Queralta – drummer	Rumba en La Habana CD/DVD recorded in Havana in 2004
2008	Geovani del Pino – director, singer, percussionist; Juan Campos "Chan" – singer; Regla Monet – singer; Jorge Armando de Armas – singer; Ronald González – singer; Demián Díaz – singer; Julio César Lemoine "El Gordo" – drummer; Adonis Panter – drummer; Héctor Oviedo – drummer; Michel Herrera – drummer; Gilberto Wiliam Ramos – drummer	European tour
2011	Geovani del Pino – director, singer, percussionist; Juan Campos "Chan" – singer; Regla Monet – singer; Ronald González – singer; Orlando Lage "Palito" – drummer; Julio César Lemoine "El Gordo" – drummer; Adonis Panter – drummer; Michel Herrera – drummer; Francisco Queralta – drummer	European tour
2012	Geovani del Pino – director, singer, percussionist; Juan Campos "Chan" – singer; Regla Monet – singer; Ronald González – singer; Demián Díaz – singer; Felipe Abreu – singer; Orlando Lage "Palito" – drummer; Julio César Lemoine "El Gordo" – drummer; Adonis Panter – drummer; Michel Herrera – drummer; Didiel Acosta – drummer; Lesmay Quintero – drummer	Europe & America tour
2012	Geovani del Pino – director, singer, percussionist; Juan Campos "Chan" – singer; Regla Monet – singer; Ronald González – singer; Demián Díaz – singer; Felipe Abreu – singer; Orlando Lage "Palito" – drummer; Julio César Lemoine "El Gordo" – drummer; Michel Herrera – drummer; Didiel Acosta – drummer; Lesmay Quintero – drummer; Derlis Zulueta – drummer	El espíritu de la rumba album recorded in Havana in 2012
2013 – 2015	Geovani del Pino – director, singer, percussionist; Juan Campos "Chan" – singer; Regla Monet – singer; Ronald González – singer; Jorge Luis Hernández – singer; Yerilú Lugo – singer; Orlando Lage "Palito" – drummer; Julio César Lemoine "El Gordo" – drummer; Didiel Acosta – drummer; Eliécer Vilches – drummer; Lekiam Aguilar – drummer	Europe & America tour; Soy de la tierra brava album recorded in Havana in 2015
2016	Didiel Acosta – director, singer, percussionist; Juan Campos "Chan" – singer; Regla Monet – singer; Ángel Yanier Roque Hernández – singer; Sergio Eladio Martínez – singer; Orlando Lage "Palito" – drummer; Julio César Lemoine "El Gordo" – drummer; Eliécer Vilches – drummer; Lekiam Aguilar – drummer; Lázaro Acosta – drummer; Kadir Yaquinay Acuña – drummer	Europe & America tour
