= Paulina Álvarez =

Cuban singer (1912–1965)

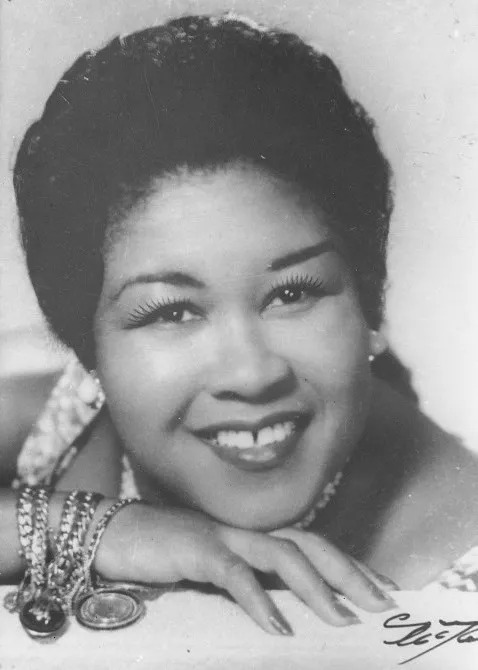

Background information
- Birth name: Raimunda Paula Peña Álvarez
- Also known as: La Emperatriz del Danzonete
- Born: June 29, 1912; Cienfuegos, Cuba
- Died: July 22, 1965 (aged 53); Havana, Cuba
- Genres: Danzonete; bolero; canción; guaracha
- Occupation: Singer
- Instrument: Voice
- Years active: 1920–65
- Labels: Victor; Panart; Areito
- Formerly of: Orquesta Elegante; Orquesta Castillito; Cheo Belén Puig; Neno González; Luis Armando Ortega; Rafael Somavilla

Raimunda Paula Peña Álvarez (June 29, 1912 – July 22, 1965), professionally known as Paulina Álvarez, was a Cuban singer recognized for her performances of danzonetes, a style that combines traditional danzón with vocals. She rose to prominence in the 1930s as the genre’s foremost interpreter and was popularly referred to as La Emperatriz del Danzonete (The Empress of the Danzonete). Her most notable success was "Rompiendo la rutina," considered the first danzonete, composed by Aniceto Díaz in 1929. In 1960, she released her only full-length LP.

== Life and career ==
=== Early life and career ===
Paulina Álvarez was born Raimunda Paula Peña Álvarez on June 29, 1912 in Cienfuegos, Cuba. By the time she was eight or nine years old she was singing at parties and school functions. In 1926, at age 14, her family moved to Havana, where she started her professional singing career in societies, theatres and radio shows. She sang boleros and canciones, but quickly became specialized in a new style of sung danzón influenced by the son cubano called danzonete. In 1931 she became the singer for Orquesta Elegante, directed by Edelmiro Pérez and featuring pianist Obdulio Morales.

=== Rise to fame ===
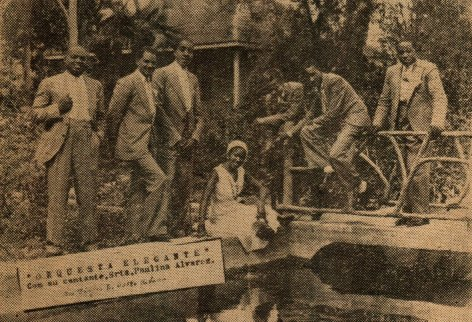
Paulina Álvarez with Orquesta Elegante in 1931.

Shortly after joining La Elegante, she rose to fame with "Rompiendo la rutina", the very first danzonete, which had been composed by Aniceto Díaz in 1929. Such hit earned her the title "La Emperatriz del Danzonete" (The Empress of the Danzonete), given to her by presenter Ruiz del Vizo. Other early hits were the boleros "Lágrimas negras" (Miguel Matamoros) and "Mujer divina" (Agustín Lara). Nonetheless, it was not easy for her to achieve success due to the sexist bias of band directors at the time. She then sang with the orchestras of Luis del Castillo (Castillito), Ernesto Muñoz, Cheo Belén Puig, Hermanos Martínez and Neno González. In 1938 she established her own band including director/flautist Manolo Morales, pianist Everardo Ordaz, double bassist Rodolfo O'Farrill and güiro player Gustavo Tamayo. With this band she recorded several singles for Victor in 1939 and 1940, including not only danzones but also guarachas and rumbas.

=== Later years ===
By the 1940s, the popularity of son conjuntos and the decline of danzón orchestras forced Álvarez to go on hiatus. She took this time to study solfège and music theory, and took up the guitar and the piano at the Academia Municipal de La Habana (current Amadeo Roldán Conservatory). She also improved her vocal technique, wanting to become a better singer. After her studies, she founded a new orchestra with his husband, violinist Luis Armando Ortega, and in 1943 they got a programme at the CMQ radio station. The new band featured flautist José Fajardo and pianist Rubén González. After another brief hiatus in the late 1940s and early 1950s, she resumed performing in 1956. In 1959, she recorded the definitive version of "Rompiendo la rutina" backed by la Gran Orquesta Típica Nacional, directed by Gilberto Valdés.

In 1960, Álvarez recorded her only LP record at Havana's EGREM studios (the former Panart studios) with Rafael Somavilla's orchestra, an album that included famous boleros such as "Campanitas de cristal" (Rafael Hernández) and "Obsesión" (Pedro Flores). Her last public appearance took place on May 18, 1965 in the television show Música y Estrellas, where she performed the bolero "Honda pena" together with famous danzón singer Barbarito Díez and the popular charanga Orquesta Aragón. Paulina Álvarez died on July 22, 1965, in Havana.

== Legacy and influence ==
Paulina Álvarez is considered one of the most influential popular female singers in Cuba, as acknowledged by salsa star Celia Cruz who considered herself a disciple of Álvarez. In 2010, famous bolero singer Omara Portuondo recorded a tribute album to Álvarez called Rompiendo la rutina, which was awarded one of the special prizes at Cubadisco 2011.
