= Aché (album) =

Studio album by Merceditas Valdés
- Released: 1982
- Recorded: Cuba
- Label: Siboney EGREM
- Producer: Rodulfo Vallant

Merceditas Valdés chronology
| Santero (1954) | Aché (1982) | Aché II (1988) |

Aché is a 1982 album by the Cuban singer Merceditas Valdés. It was a return to recording after a long absence from the studio, and the first of four albums of Yoruba-roots influenced music. The album won an EGREM prize. Aché is the Cuban spelling of Ase, the Orisha term for "life power", and Valdés herself was sometimes known by the nickname "Little Aché".

== Track listing ==
Songs are adaptations of folk tunes except where noted.

Side A

1. Eleguá
2. Ogún
3. "Lacho"
4. Quirino (Eliseo Grenet, N. Guillén)
5. Changó

Side B

1. Mango Mangué
2. Drume Negrito (Grenet)
3. Ochún – 3:54
4. Yambambó (Grenet, Guillén)
5. Obatalá
