= Teatro Principal =

Teatro Principal may refer to:

- Teatre Principal (Barcelona), Barcelona, Spain
- Teatro Principal (Caracas), Caracas, Venezuela, built in the Art Deco style
- Teatro Principal (Guanajuato), Guanajuato, Mexico
- Teatro Principal de la Comedia, Havana, Cuba
- Teatre Principal de Maó, Mahón, Spain
- Principal Theatre (Pontevedra), Pontevedra, Spain
- Teatro Principal de Puebla, Puebla, Mexico
- Teatro Principal de València, Valencia, Spain
- Teatro Principal (Zaragoza), Zaragoza, Spain, founded by Martín Zapater
