= Enrico Mario Santí =

Cuban-American writer and poet (born 1950)

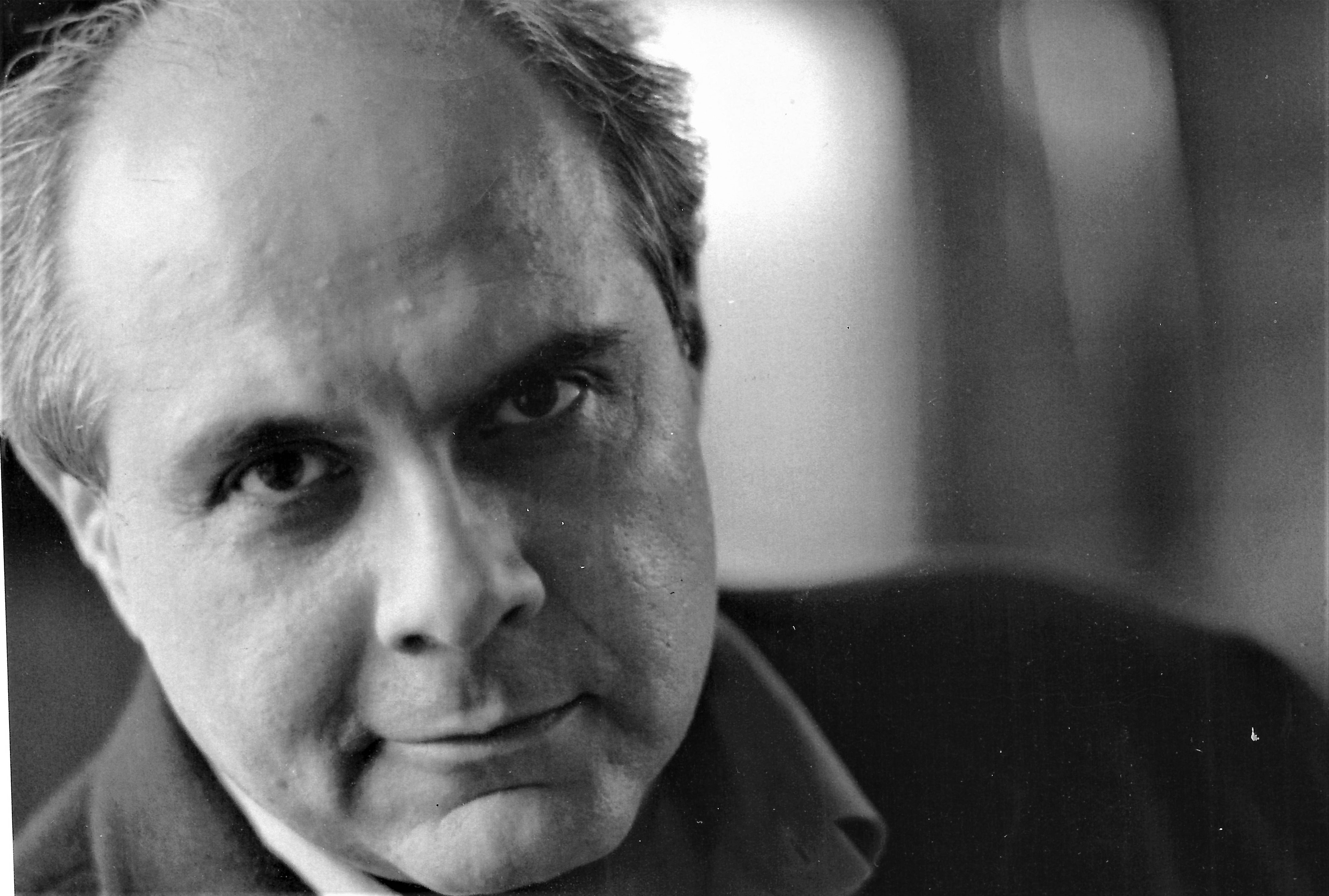
- Enrico Mario Santí in 2000
- Born: Enrico Mario Santí; 1 July 1950 (age 76); Santiago de Cuba, Cuba
- Education: Vanderbilt, Yale
- Occupations: Writer; professor
- Writing career
- Language: Spanish, English
- Subjects: Octavio Paz; José Martí; Pablo Neruda; Guillermo Cabrera Infante; Fernando Ortiz; Reinaldo Arenas; Severo Sarduy
- Notable works: El acto de las palabras; Bienes del siglo; Ciphers of History; Pablo Neruda: The Poetics of Prophecy
- Notable awards: Fulbright Fellowship 1982; Guggenheim Fellowship 1983; ACLS Fellowship 2004; NEH Fellowship 2010

Enrico Mario Santí (born 1 July 1950) is a Cuban-American writer, poet, and scholar of Spanish American Literature known for his critical essays and annotated editions of Latin American classics, including works by Octavio Paz, Pablo Neruda, and Guillermo Cabrera Infante. A frequent political commentator and art critic, he is also a sculptor and voice actor. As a child, Santí emigrated from Cuba to the United States, where he has had an extensive career as a professor in several universities. Currently, he is a research professor at Claremont Graduate University, in Claremont, California.

== Career ==
Born to a middle-class family from the eastern end of Cuba, Santí emigrated to the United States in October 1962, shortly after the Cuban Revolution. Raised in Miami, educated at Vanderbilt and Yale, he obtained his PhD at the latter institution, where he studied alongside scholars José Juan Arrom and Emir Rodríguez Monegal. Santí went on to teach at Duke University, Cornell, Georgetown, and the University of Kentucky. In 1983, while an associate professor at Cornell, Santí was made Clark Distinguished Teacher of the Year. A few years later, in 1996, he became the youngest holder of the Emilio Bacardí Visiting Chair in Cuban Studies at the University of Miami. In 2000, he became the first William T. Bryan Endowed Chair in Hispanic Studies at the University of Kentucky, where four years later, in 2004, he was also awarded a University Research Professorship for his outstanding research contributions.

Santí has authored fourteen books, edited eighteen volumes (including three with Cuban-American professor and author Nivia Montenegro) and published over one hundred articles, essays, and interviews. His six critical and annotated editions of classics of Latin American literature – Pablo Neruda's Canto general, Octavio Paz's Libertad bajo palabra and El laberinto de la soledad, Fernando Ortiz's Contrapunteo cubano del tabaco y el azúcar, Guillermo Cabrera Infante's Tres tristes tigres, and Reinaldo Arenas's El mundo alucinante – are used widely in college and university courses around the world.

A significant part of Santí's research has been dedicated to the study of Octavio Paz's life and work. Since 1984, he has labored on collecting and organizing Paz's literary production. Throughout the years, the relationship between the Mexican poet and Santí grew to be a close one: of Santí's "Introduction″ to El laberinto de la soledad, Octavio Paz himself wrote: "Yours is the first essay in which I feel really understood and read."

A published poet himself, in 2014 Santí began translating poetry from American English into Cuban Spanish, including works by Wallace Stevens and Hart Crane (in addition to several Cuban-American poets). His translations have appeared in many journals and, recently, in a book of poems by Ricardo Pau-Llosa, titled Intruder Between Rivers / Intruso entre ríos. As a voice actor, Santí has recorded three voice narratives of works by Guillermo Cabrera Infante, published in 2016 and 2017 as Audible audiobooks. In 2019, the Pomona Latino Art Museum featured his wooden sculptures as part of a group exhibition titled "Mes de la Hispanidad".

Between 1990 and 1999, Santí served as one of four rotating editors of the journal Cuban Studies. After his service as editor, he remained a member of the journal's advisory board and, in 2015, he was appointed one of five Senior Honorary Members. Throughout his career, he has received Guggenheim, Woodrow Wilson, ACLS, NEH, and Fulbright fellowships. Santí has also been the recipient of life-achievement awards from the Southern California Cuban-American Cultural Institute (1999), Patronato José Martí (2000), Mexico's Conaculta (2005) and Sigma Delta Pi, Hispanic Honor Society (2010).

== Notable works ==
=== Books ===
- Pablo Neruda: The Poetics of Prophecy (1982)
- Escritura y tradición: texto, crítica y poética en la literatura hispanoamericana (1988)
- Pensar a José Martí. Notas para un centenario (1995)
- Por una politeratura. Literatura hispanoamericana e imaginación política (1997)
- El acto de las palabras. Estudios y diálogos con Octavio Paz (1998)
- Bienes del siglo. Sobre cultura cubana (2002)
- Fernando Ortiz: Contrapunteo y transculturación (2002)
- Ciphers of History: Latin American Readings for a "Cultural" Age (2005)
- Mano a mano: Ensayos de circunstancia (2012)
- Conversaciones con Octavio Paz. Diálogos con Enrico Mario Santí (2014)
- Intruder Between Rivers / Intruso entre ríos (2018). With Ricardo Pau-Llosa. Text includes Pau-Llosa's original poems in English and Santí's translations to Cuban-Spanish.
- El peregrino de la bodega oscura, y otros ensayos (2021)
- El otro tiempo / The Other Time: Aurelio de la Vega y la música // Aurelio de la Vega and Music (2021). Text in Spanish and English.
- Enduring Cuba: Thirty Essays (2022). Text in Spanish and English.

=== Poems ===
- Son Peregrino (1995)

=== Edited publications ===
- Pablo Neruda. Edited with Emir Rodríguez Monegal. Madrid: Taurus, 1980.
- "The Emergence of Cuban National Identity". Pittsburgh: University of Pittsburgh Press, 1986. Collection of essays published in Cuban Studies, vol. 16.
- Libertad bajo palabra. By Octavio Paz, introduction and annotations by Enrico Mario Santí. Madrid: Cátedra, 1988. Latest (revised and expanded) edition: Cátedra, 2014; ISBN 978-84-376-3293-3.
- Primeras letras (1931–1943). By Octavio Paz, introduction and annotations by Enrico Mario Santí. Mexico City: Editorial Vuelta, 1988.
- Canto general. By Pablo Neruda, introduction and annotations by Enrico Mario Santí. Madrid: Cátedra, 1990. Latest (revised) edition: Cátedra, 2005; ISBN 978-84-376-0930-0.
- El laberinto de la soledad. By Octavio Paz, introduction and annotations by Enrico Mario Santí. Madrid: Cátedra, 1993. Latest (revised and expanded) edition: Cátedra, 2015; ISBN 978-84-376-3399-2.
- Blanco. By Octavio Paz, epilogue and annotations by Enrico Mario Santí. Madrid: Ediciones Turner, 1995. Alongside Blanco, this edition includes another volume titled Archivo Blanco that contains a facsimile of Paz's poem, transcriptions of draft versions, and correspondence between Paz and the poem's various translators.
- Infantería. By Guillermo Cabrera Infante, edited with Nivia Montenegro. Mexico City: Fondo de Cultura Económica, 2000.
- El laberinto de la soledad. By Octavio Paz. Mexico City: Fondo de Cultura Económica, 2000. Special two-volume edition commemorating the 50th anniversary of its first publication; ISBN 978-9681663049.
- Contrapunteo cubano del tabaco y el azúcar. By Fernando Ortiz. Madrid: Cátedra, 2002.
- El mundo alucinante. By Reinaldo Arenas, introduction and annotations by Enrico Mario Santí. Madrid: Cátedra, 2008.
- Luz espejeante: Octavio Paz ante la crítica. Mexico City: Ediciones Era, 2009.
- Tres tristes tigres. By Guillermo Cabrera Infante, edited with Nivia Montenegro. Madrid: Cátedra, 2010.
- Pasado y presente en claro: 20 años del Premio Nobel. By Octavio Paz. Mexico City: Fondo de Cultura Económica, 2010.
- Libro de Arenas. Prosa dispersa (1965–1990). By Reinaldo Arenas, edited with Nivia Montenegro. Mexico City: DGE Equilibrista, 2013. Latest (revised and expanded) edition: Casa Vacía, 2022; ISBN 978-6077874416.
- Cuarenta años de escribir poesía. Conferencias de El Colegio Nacional. By Octavio Paz. Mexico City: DGE Equilibrista, 2014.
- Príncipes del Puerto: Severo Sarduy y Clara Niggemann. By Severo Sarduy and Clara Niggemann. Santiago de Querétaro: Rialta Ediciones, 2021.
- El silencio que no muere (1953–1964). By Severo Sarduy. Madrid: Huerga y Fierro Editores, 2022.

=== Voice acting ===
- Three Trapped Tigers. By Guillermo Cabrera Infante. Audible, 2016. Audiobook in English.
- Tres tristes tigres. By Guillermo Cabrera Infante. Audible, 2017. Audiobook in Cuban Spanish.
- La Habana para un infante difunto. By Guillermo Cabrera Infante. Audible, 2017. Audiobook in Cuban Spanish.
