= Esther Borja =

Cuban operatic soprano (1913–2013)

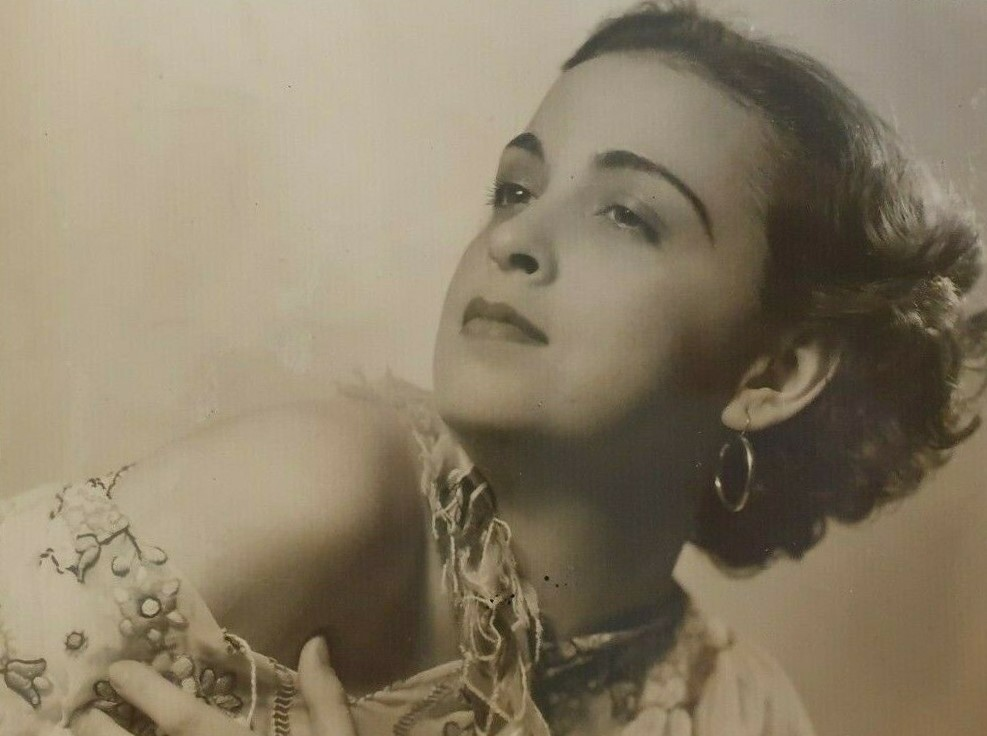
Esther Borja by Annemarie Heinrich, 1937

Esther Borja Lima (5 December 1913 – 28 December 2013) was a Cuban operatic soprano.

== Biography ==
Havana-born Esther Borja Lima was trained in solfége and music theory by Juan Elósegui, and in singing by Rubén Lepchutz. She graduated as a teacher in 1934, and began her career in 1935; that year she performed, with Ernesto Lecuona on piano, at the National Theatre (now the Gran Teatro de La Habana), and at the Auditorium Amadeo Roldán. The same year she sang the waltz Damisela encantadora in the operetta Lola Cruz by Lecuona. Her voice was described as a "beautiful mezzo-soprano with clear diction and a good feel for melody".

At the time Borja started her career, and for years after, Rita Montaner was the leading stage musical star in Cuba. However, Montaner (who was also a fine pianist) gradually shifted her career from operatic-style singing towards Afro-Cuban character roles and films, and then began some remarkable radio shows with biting humour and political satire. Borja, on the other hand, remained primarily a singer, and later took over some of the soprano parts that Montaner had previously dominated.

Borja made her first overseas tour to Argentina in 1936 with Lecuona, his sister Ernestina, and Bola de Nieve. The quartet made a film, Adiós, Buenos Aires, in 1937, and Esther stayed there until 1943. From her new base in the Argentine, Borja sang and performed zarzuelas by Lecuona and other composers, and toured Chile, Peru, Brazil and Uruguay. In 1943, she returned to Cuba to work in concerts organized by Eliseo Grenet, and left again to go to New York. There she appeared with Lecuona in the Steinway Hall until Sigmund Romberg put her under contract to appear with his orchestra at the Carnegie Hall.

She completed five tours of the US with this band. Eventually, she returned to Cuba, and continued her career in operettas, zarzuelas and on radio. Her last appearances in the lyric theatre were in Madrid and Barcelona in 1953.

For twenty years on Cuban television, from 1961, she fronted the show Álbum de Cuba, and sang in venues throughout Cuba. She died on 28 December 2013, aged 100.

== CDs ==
All CDs are compilations of earlier recordings.

Canta a varias voces 1991
Rapsodia de Cuba 1992
Musica de Lecuona 1993
Canciones cubanas 1994
Longina 1999
Canta a dos, tres y cuatro voces 2004
