= History of a Cuban Struggle Against the Demons =

Book by Fernando Ortiz

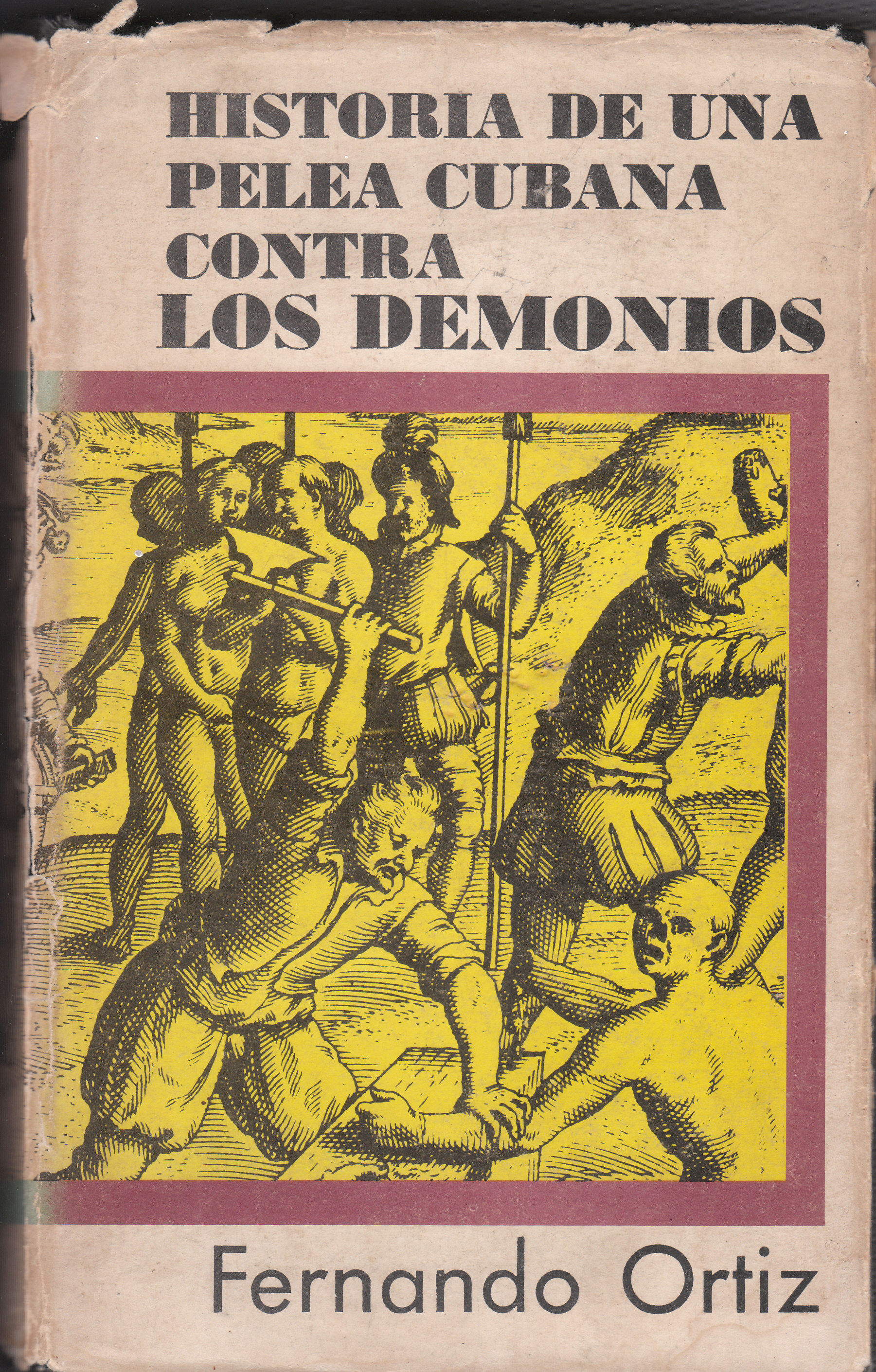
History of A Cuban Struggle Against the Demons

History of a Cuban Struggle Against The Demons ( Historia de una pelea cubana contra los demonios in Spanish) is a book written by ethnologist Fernando Ortiz Fernández, published in 1959 by the university of Santa Clara city: Universidad Central de Las Villas. In this voluminous essay, the author explores the colonial history of the town of Remedios.

Fr. José González de la Cruz, a priest, alarms the people of the town with news that Lucifer, the prince of darkness, commands an army of demons against them. He proposes that they move the settlement to another place in his own lands. These events took place near the end of the seventeenth century, when the interior towns of the Cuban island were largely ignored by the Spanish Monarchy and colonial government. Like the people of Trinidad and Sancti Spírirus, those in Remedios suffered incursions and frequent raids by pirates and corsairs, who were mostly devoted to smuggling. Many of the people of Remedios feared them and sided with the priest's suggestion to move. In the end, a part of the people of Remedios left to hatos de cupey a nearby region, where they developed what is known as the city of Santa Clara. In the 21st century, it is the capital of the Villa Clara province.

== Movie adaptation ==
Tomas Gutierrez Alea and Miguel Barnet adapted the book and wrote the screenplay for a Spanish-language film, which Gutierrez Alea directed. Based on events in 1672, when the people rose against the Spanish colonists, it was named Una pelea cubana contra los demonios (A Cuban Fight Against Demons) and released in 1972. The film was preserved by the Academy Film Archive, in conjunction with the Instituto Cubano de Arte e Industria Cinematográfica, in 2017.
