= List of Picasso Medal winners =

The UNESCO Picasso Medal, initiated in 1975, is awarded annually to musicians or musical institutions whose activity has contributed to the enrichment and development of music. It aims to serve peace, understanding between peoples and international cooperation as well as other purposes proclaimed by the United Nations Charter and UNESCO's constitution.

== Recipients ==
- Alicia Alonso
- Leonard Bernstein
- Nadia Boulanger
- Joan Brossa
- Henri Coursaget
- Celina González
- Herbert von Karajan
- Dani Karavan
- Nusrat Fateh Ali Khan
- Yehudi Menuhin
- Ariane Mnouchkine
- Youssou N'Dour
- Emmanuel Nunes
- Octavio Paz
- Oscar Peterson
- Mohammad-Reza Shajarian
- Dmitri Shostakovich
- Mikis Theodorakis
- Merceditas Valdés
- Tahir Salahov
- Augusto Boal
- Ricardo Alegría
