= Gilberto Valdés =

Cuban music director and composer

Gilberto S. Valdés (21 May 1905, in Jovellanos, Matanzas – 12 May 1972, in New York City) was a Cuban music director and composer who specialised in the afro genre of Cuban popular music. Valdés was one of the first popular bandleaders to introduce African melody, rhythm and traditional themes into his music. His Afro-Cuban compositions first gained attention in 1935, when Rita Montaner, accompanied by the pianist Rafael Betancourt, presented his songs "Bembé", "Baró", "Tambó" and "Sangre africana" in the Teatro Principal de la Comedia.

== Discography ==
- Cuban ballet Orquesta de Cámara de Madrid dir. Gilberto Valdés LP Montilla 92:
- Hi Fi in the tropics LP Montilla 94
- Gran Orquesta Típica Nacional LP Puchito SP-114:
- Rezo de santo – Ritmo de santo de la tierra de África en Arará. LP Maype 180
- La música del maestro Gilberto Valdés – Con su orquesta LP Panart 3101

== See also ==
- Afrocubanismo
- Eliseo Grenet
