= Ellen Diggs =

American anthropologist

Ellen Irene Diggs
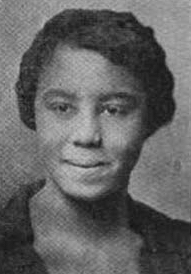
- Ellen Diggs as a high school student, from a 1923 publication.
- Born: 1906; Monmouth, Illinois
- Died: 1998 (aged 91–92)

Academic background
- Education: Monmouth College; University of Minnesota; Atlanta University; University of Havana
- Influences: W. E. B. Du Bois

Academic work
- Discipline: Anthropology, Sociology, and History
- Sub-discipline: Black History and culture, Black studies, African disapora
- Institutions: US, Cuba, Uruguay, and Argentina
- Main interests: African History, African diaspora studies, Black studies
- Notable works: "Black Chronology"

Ellen Irene Diggs (1906–1998) was an American anthropologist, sociologist, and historian. She was the writer of a major contribution to African American history, Black Chronology: From 4,000 B.C. to the Abolition of the Slave Trade. Her academic work aimed to empower and visualize Afro-American chronology as a way to contest the idea that Africans and African Americans had no history and provided no contributions to modern culture. Dr. Irene Diggs (Irene was her preferred name) was the first Black woman to write about race relations and the African diaspora in the Americas. She spent her whole academic career fighting against and researching racism, as well as the cultural and historical contributions of Africans and the African diaspora in the Americas. Alongside her academic mentor W. E. B. Du Bois, she co-founded Phylon: A Review of Race and Culture, and published her scholarly research across multiple journals.

She was also the first Black woman ever to receive a Ph.D. in anthropology from the University of Havana.

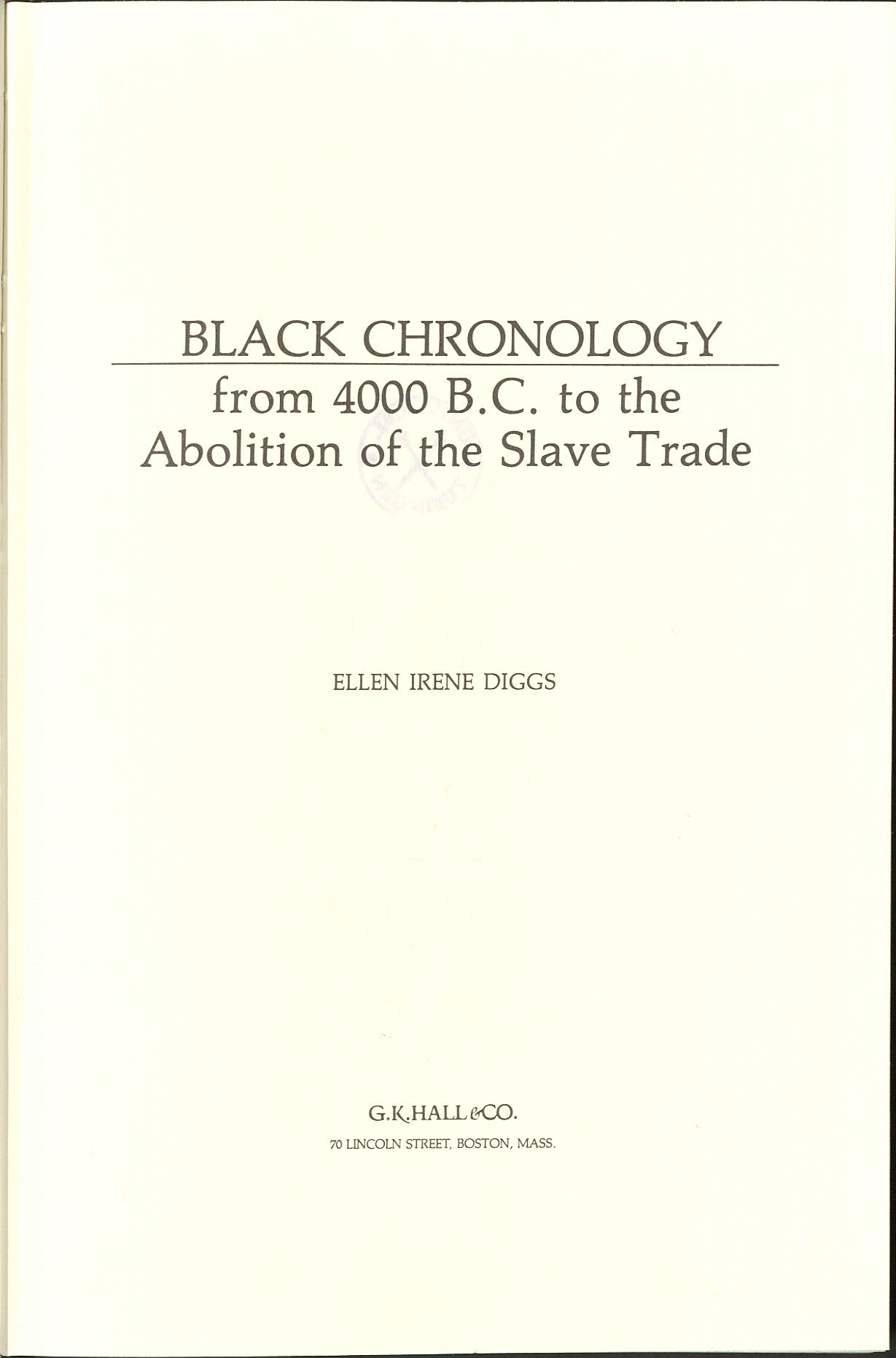
Ellen Irene Diggs Black Chronology 1983

== Biography ==
Diggs was born in Monmouth, Illinois, on April 13, 1906, to a low-income working-class family, which was supportive of her and her academic pursuits. She was exposed to multiple forms of inequality, from poverty to unequal wages in the most marginalized areas of her town. It is this personal experience around inequality that would later on inspire her work on the living conditions of Black people in the US and across the Americas.

Her parents, Henry Charles Diggs and Alice Scott, always encouraged her reading and intellectualism, as well as enforced the value of education. Her outstanding academic achievements in high school that led Diggs to obtain an academic college scholarship. Diggs first enrolled in Monmouth College, and then transferred to the University of Minnesota, where she studied sociology and completed a minor in psychology. She graduated from college in 1928. Afterwards, she enrolled in Atlanta University's MA program in Sociology, having Du Bois as her academic mentor. She later became Du Bois’s research assistant from 1932 to 1942, where she helped him publish multiple research articles and five academic books.

After almost a decade working for Du Bois, she resigned from her position and pursued a doctoral studies in anthropology at the University of Havana, Cuba, earning a Ph.D. in 1945. Later on, she returned to the United States, worked again for a short time with Du Bois, and began extended fieldwork in Latin America.

After returning from her fieldwork, Diggs received her appointment as a professor of Sociology at Morgan State University. She worked from 1947 to 1976. At Morgan State, she encountered wage discrimination; her salary of $5,100 was ineligible for an increase since her doctorate was not granted by an American institution.

== Black Chronology ==
Black Chronology from 4000 B.C. to the Abolition of the Slave Trade was Diggs' major contribution and only single-authored book, and was originally published in 1983. Edited by Charles T. Davis and Henry-Louis Gates Jr., this book traces the chronology of Africans' and Afro-Americans' history, from 4777 B.C., with the first of three Egyptian empires, all the way to 1888, when all enslaved people in Brazil were emancipated. Black Chronology establishes a detailed historical timeline that directly reflects on the slave trade, and the impact on both White and Black people, as well as the inhumane institutions that slavery created, and the struggles against it (page X). This book's main broad aim is to increase “our knowledge and understanding of the Afro-American past” (page X). The project relevance is articulated by Diggs on page XI:

A chronology of Afro-American history is important because there is so widespread belief that Africa and Africans have no history, have not achieved, have made little or no contribution to culture; that Africa is dark, mysterious continent, isolated, and insulated from the rest of the world; that what happened in Africa does not matter. Diggs hopes her historical project tackles the incongruences, distortions, and obscurities of the African past, and also the history of Afro-Americans.

In addition to creating a compilation of Black life, key milestones, and inventions in Africa, Diggs also connects African history all the way to modernity, in particular around slavery and the slave trade. Black Chronology fills in the gap, systematizes, and revisits the history of slavery, paying attention to the particular systems of violence created, and also to the modes of resistance that were enacted against those systems themselves. Regarding slavery and the slave trade, Diggs makes the case that the struggles in the 1950s and 1960s for racial equality and social justice in the US are an accelerated representation of the struggles that began as soon as the first 20 Black people arrived in the Americas (page X). This becomes crucial considering the understanding that slavery and the slave trade system, particularly in the US, were foundational for the development across the globe, as Diggs articulates (page X).

Some examples that illustrate the breadth and depth of Black Chronology include:

- C.3000 B.C “Imhotep, a learned black physician, the earliest known physician and history’s earliest known scientific genius, lived in Egypt. In the course of time, he was deified and became for later generations the special god of medicine” (p. 2)
- C.1 A.D “The skills of metal-working began to be understood and practiced, perhaps beginning with copper in the regions of modern Katanga, and northern Zambia. They soon began working in iron. Population was small. There is evidence of early farming and cultivation of millet.” (p. 10)
- “Sailors from Egypt and Arabia visited the East Coast of Africa for trade, buying African ivory, tortoise shell, and other products. There is increasing evidence that African slaves were being transported to India before and at the beginning of the Christian era.”
- 1511 “First blacks brought to Cuba from Spain” (p. 47)
- 1517 “Bartholome de Las Casas appealed to King Ferdinand of Spain that Africans be sent to America to substitute for Indians in the mines.” (p. 48) 1705 “The Virginia slave code defined slaves as being real state” (p. 90)
- 1710 “There was a widespread slave conspiracy in Brazil (…) Mohammedan blacks revolted repeatedly.” (p. 92)
- 1838 “Abolition of slavery in the dominions of Great Britain” (p. 183)
- 1888 [last year covered by Black Chronology] “Slavery is abolished in Brazil. There were approximately 725,000 slaves in Brazil at this time.” (p. 288)
  - “The total number of slaves imported is not known. It is estimated that nearly 900,000 came to America in the sixteenth century, 2.75 million in the seventeenth century, 7 million in the eighteenth, and over 4 million in the nineteenth—perhaps 15 million in total. Probably every slave imported represented, on the average, five corpses in Africa or on the high seas. The American slave trade, therefore, meant the elimination of at least 60 million Africans from their fatherland. The Mohammedan slave trade meant the expatriation or forcible migration in Africa of nearly as many more. It would be conservative, then, to say that the slave trade cost Africa 100 million people.” (288–289)

There are very limited academic reviews of Black Chronology and that the relevance and reach of this piece might be limited. While the contribution to African and Afro-American History could be considerable, particularly around her documentation of slavery, salve trade, and resistance, there might be some inconsistencies and issues with this publication. G.S.P. Freeman-Grenville, historian and author of Chronology of African History (1973) and The New Atlas of African History (1991) offers a diverse perspective on Black Chronology. Freeman-Greenville argues that Dr Diggs' work provides disconnected information until the 18th century, and omits key information, including the Bantu Expansion. Most critically, he challenges her notion that the belief that Africans have no history is widespread across the world. He asserts that History has become a rigorous subject across African schools, libraries, and academia, and that Africans have been active in the teaching and development of their own histories.

== Work in the US ==
=== Research work ===
Diggs worked with Du Bois while being a graduate student at Atlanta University, and for almost a decade after graduating, amounting to almost 14 years. Her graduate work for her MA in Sociology concluded with a dissertation titled "A Study of Delinquency Among Negro Girls in Atlanta.” As a graduate student research assistant, and afterwards, as a full-time assistant, Diggs supported multiple of Du Bois' publications and major works, including Black Reconstruction in America (1935), Black Folk: Then and Now (1939), and Dusk of Dawn (1940). Part of her contribution to US American scholarship on race and racism was through her support of Du Bois' scholarship, and co-creation of Phylon: The Clark Atlanta University Review of Race and Culture, and The Encyclopedia of the Negro (1945).

She supported and also led major research into the color line in the US and Latin America, becoming a leading expert in both territories on the history and experience of people of African descent and their racialized experience. Some of her most well-known works include "The Biological and Cultural Impact of Blacks on the United States" (1960) and "Colonial Sexual Behavior."

=== Relationship with Du Bois ===
Diggs and Du Bois built a close relationship in their work and academic life. In Diggs’ Black Chronology (page 263), she even put the birth and life of Du Bois as one of the key moments in her chronology of key moments in African and Afro-American History. Du Bois was Digg's academic mentor, and she also had a deep admiration for him. In this new introduction (postmortem of Du Bois), Dr. Diggs highlights the methodological and theoretical importance of this work while also providing critical context about Du Bois's personal, academic, and activist life. The “Introduction To The Transaction Edition” reveals Dr. Diggs and Du Bois' closeness. She reveals, for example, Du Bois’ feelings towards the speech given on his 70th birthday, and how he felt they were reading his eulogy. Most importantly, she texturizes his well-known trajectory as scholar, teacher, and activist, with Du Bois’ values and ideas changing over time. Particularly, Dr. Diggs traces Du Bois’ trajectory with the concept and problem of race, relating first to Black people, and then later on in his life with all non-white people.

However, while they did seem to have a close personal and academic relationship, there is some evidence that shows that Diggs' scholarship lost visibility in part due to sexism, racism, but also due to Du Bois' efforts to invisibilize her work.

== Work In Latin America ==
=== Cuba ===
In 1941, Diggs and Du Bois sailed to Cuba to begin a research project documenting the lives of Afro-Cubans. In Cuba, she was impressed by the way African culture was maintained. In 1943, she returned to Cuba and asked Fernando Ortiz to be her academic mentor, and from 1943 to 1945, she attended the University of Havana, where she became the first African American woman to receive a PhD at the university, and the first to earn a Doctorate in Philosophy and Letters in Anthropology. In the summer of 1943, she attended Ortiz's class and institute to gain fluency in Spanish, and afterwards she enrolled as a full-time graduate student. She became a Franklin D. Roosevelt Fellow from 43 to 45, which allowed her to support her studies as a doctoral student.

Her main focus for her doctoral research was on the survival of West African customs in Cuba. She was interested in particular in how the survival and integration of African culture reduces anti-Black racism. She looked at “African-Survivials.” Her experience in Cuba was foundational for her development as a scholar. It is worth noting that being able to study in Cuba allowed Diggs to forge her own academic path separate from Du Bois, and that most of Du Bois’ perspective in Latin American studies of Black people was indebted to his collaboration with Diggs.

In Havana, she had issues finding housing, encountered multiple forms of discrimination, and differences from white and white US American students at the University of Havana. However, Ortiz, as her mentor, introduced her to a web of academics and other critical people and provided and accompanied her while in her studies.

=== Work In the Rio De La Plata (Uruguay and Argentina) ===
Dr. Diggs became the first Black woman supported by the State Department to study the social conditions and relationships in South America, focusing on the history of African slaves brought to Montevideo by ship. From her research in Uruguay, she asserted that Uruguayans of African descent still maintain their cultural habits and values despite racial amalgamation. Furthermore, she sustained that even though there is a conservation of their African costumes and cultures, Black Uruguayans align themselves with people of their same class, and how in the mid-20th century, those of European descent were equally disenfranchised as Black Uruguayans.

As part of her archival historical work, she studied in depth when, how, and on what conditions African slaves were brought to the Viceroyalty of the Rio De La Plata. Diggs traced more than 300 years of the History of slavery and the slave trade, from the first record of Black people being brought to the Rio De La Plata in 1527 to the end of slavery in 1842 in Uruguay and Argentina. While she provides a general overview of the changing legal, social, and economic status of enslaved Africans and their descendants, she also looks to shed light on the ways they resisted against slavery, as well as their overlooked social and cultural contributions (from language to music and gastronomy).Diggs marks the legal end of slavery in 1842; however, as she also states, slavery continued long after, particularly in rural areas, and in less wealthy families, as “slaves presented their [White or criollo Uruguayans/Argentinian] only fortune.”

In addition to her broader historical work, she also published on specific historical figures. In the 1953 edition of The Crisis, she published about Melitón and Schimu, two salve-gauchos in Argentina. Melitón became a free man by paying his owner, but still wanted to work for him; however, he was kicked out of the farm. Later on, he came back looking to still get the job, and was killed by his ex-owner. She also studied the story of Schimu, another slave-gaucho who became the temporary governor of Santiago Del Estero, and then sold his position for 50 pesos, and got back to his gaucho life.

=== Race Relations and Amalgamation ===
Right in the middle of the 20th century, Dr Diggs was one of the leading experts on the topic of race, race relations, and the color line in Latin America. She also placed a focus on the experience of violence against racialized women.

As part of Diggs' research in South America, she visited Brazil for about a month in 1947. Extending her research agenda to study broadly the ways Afro-Latin Americans lived, integrated, and navigated race differences in their cultural context. Diggs wrote multiple cultural studies, ethnographic, as well as historical pieces. Her article, "Amalgamation and Race Relations," traces race amalgamation and slavery in South America to analyze the differences between problems faced by racialized people in South America versus North America. She argues that it is the racial amalgamation of the Spanish and Portuguese with the Indigenous populations and African slaves that formed a “new species,” (criollos, those of mixed ancestry), who are looking to build a more equal future for all. She compared the context of Black people in South America to segregation in the US, and argued that differences in living conditions might arise from the historic racial amalgamation. Moreover, she argued that amalgamation made independence necessary from colonial metropolises. She provides a post-racial perspective of South America, stating that “All South Americans, regardless of color, are criollos.”

Today, the population of these countries is neither European, colored, nor indigenous—it represents a new species which is well on the road to homogeneity. The new species seems committed to the proposition that all citizens shall be equal, designated as South Americans and distinguished one from another only by their countries. South Americans today are much more proud to be Uruguayans, Argentines, Brazilians, than Spaniards or Portuguese.

Importantly, particularly considering the historical context, Diggs publishes a version of her theory of amalgamation in "Attitudes Towards Color in South America," where she states that race was not a biological fact, rather a social reality, and that the way Black people, and other gender minorities, are treated changes depending on the context. She argued that Black people in the US encountered more violence than Black people in South American countries. This paper was published in Negro History Bulletin, May 1971.

=== Visit to Brazil ===
Some of her work, particularly on race amalgamation, was influenced by her visit to Brazil, which occurred after her extended visit and fieldwork in Argentina and Uruguay. In Brazil, she stated that she experienced a Jim Crow-like experience differently from Uruguay and Argentina. In each country (Uruguay, Argentina, and Brazil), Dr. Diggs not only wrote about general trends in the history of slavery and Afro-Latin American History, but also wrote about particular cultural/historic practices or histories.

She wrote a paper titled "Zumbi and the Republic of Os Palmares" in Phylon (1953). In this paper, she explored the story and history of Zumbi and quilombos in Brazil, particularly in Os Palmares. Zumbi was presented both as a folk hero and an actual historical figure who died fighting for his freedom and as a symbol of the anti-savery movement. Zumbi escaped his owners and fought to be free, landing in one of the biggest quilombos (a place of active anti-slavery resistance where African slaves would reside and organize) in Brazil, where he would later become the main leader. He died on November 20 of 1695, fighting against the Portuguese colonial rule. Diggs argued the quilombo of OS Palmares led by Zumbi was not just a simple isolated revolt but rather marks the beginning of the Independence of Brazil (page 69).

== Visit to Israel ==
During the summer of 1951, Diggs, part of the New York University Workshop on Israel and Culture, visited Israel. This visit inspired her and her scholarship in multiple ways, as she was able to observe the building and development of schools, clinics, and industries. Israel, as a new state-nation, was beginning to develop, which was an opportunity to see how people from different backgrounds created a new country and related to each other. Based on her visit, she created a course at Morgan State College on Israeli life and culture to teach her students about the historical context and socio-economic situation of the then-emerging nation. Diggs stated that her class was able to offer a new perspective to her students, who previously did not have a deep understanding of Jewish life, culture, and history. She expressed that her students learned more empathy for Jewish people, and some Black and other minority students could better understand their problems and context through this class. (105–106)

In a paper titled "Israel", Diggs begins to explore the question of cultural and identity amalgamation in the formation of the country of Israel. She was interested in how, through understanding the cultural relationships development in Israel, she could better understand those in the US. Diggs analyzed what type of artistic, scientific, and socio-economic organizational practices people who were coming to Israel, from across cultures, were inventing or reproducing from their country of origin. Music development, for example, is mentioned to have been in an early stage, and that it might be future generations, those born in Israel, and not migrants, who might be best equipped to develop it. In terms of the political economy, Diggs argues that they had chosen mutual aid and an equitable distribution of services and goods. (422–426)

== Bibliography ==
- Gacs, Ute; McIntyre, Jerrie (1988). Women Anthropologists: Selected Biographies. University of Illinois Press. ISBN 978-0-252-06084-7.
- Harvey, Joy; Ogilvie, Marilyn (2000). The Biographical Dictionary of Women in Science: Pioneering Lives from Ancient Times to the Mid-Twentieth Century. Taylor & Francis. ISBN 978-0-415-92038-4.
- Oakes, Elizabeth H. (2007). Encyclopedia of World Scientists. Infobase Publishing. ISBN 978-1-4381-1882-6.

== Referenced Works ==
- Black chronology from 4000 B.C. to the abolition of the slave trade, G.K. Hall, 1983, ISBN 9780816185436
