= Cajón de rumba =

Cuban wood box percussion instrument

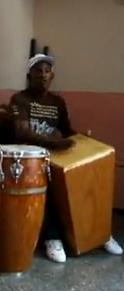
Cajón de rumba

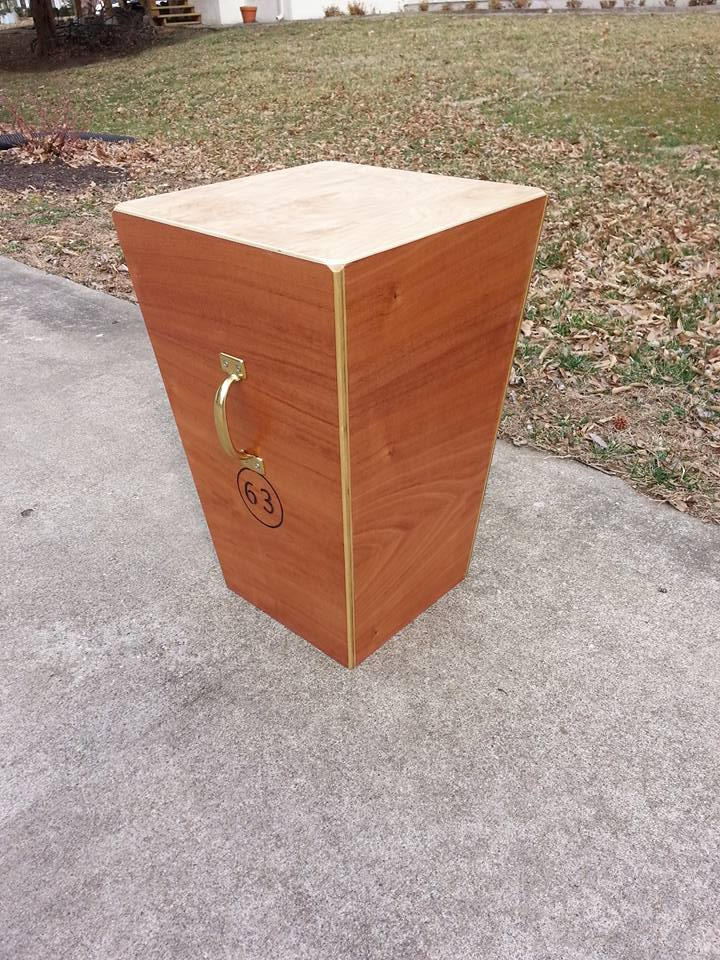
Mahogany Supertumba by 63rd Street Percussion

The cajones de rumba are wooden boxes used as rhythmic percussion instruments in some styles of Cuban rumba. There are different types of cajones, namely the cajón tumbadora, the cajón bajo and the cajita, all of which are hand-struck.

Cajones arrived to the docks of Matanzas and Havana in the 19th century. They were full of imported fish, mainly cod, but quickly repurposed as drums by the Afro-Cuban dockworkers. The big boxes were the precursors of the modern tumbadora and the small ones corresponded to the modern quinto (the smallest, lead conga drum). The equivalent of claves were two wooden spoons. Although cajones were mostly replaced by tumbadoras by the early 20th century, they are played in contemporary styles such as guarapachangueo. In this regard, Pancho Quinto is a notable crafter and player of the instrument. Miguel "Angá" Díaz often played the cajón as well.

== See also ==
- Cajón - Afro-Peruvian instrument similar to the Cuban cajón
- Cajón de tapeo - Mexican version of the cajón
