= Jane Bunnett =

Canadian musician and educator

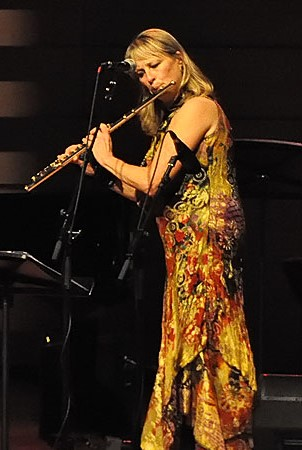
- Jane Bunnett in 2012

Background information
- Born: Mary Jane Bunnett; October 22, 1956 (age 69); Toronto, Ontario
- Genres: Afro-Cuban jazz
- Occupation: Musician
- Instruments: Soprano saxophone, flute, piano

Mary Jane Bunnett, OC (born October 22, 1956) is a Canadian musician and educator. A soprano saxophonist, flautist and bandleader, she is especially known for performing Afro-Cuban jazz. She travels regularly to Cuba to perform with Cuban musicians.

== Early life and education ==
She changed her instruments, from pursuing her career "as a classical pianist...at age 20 to jazz and to flute and soprano saxophone."

== Career ==
Bunnett founded and leads an all-female Afro-Cuban/jazz group, Maqueque. Its other members are: Dánae Olano (vocals, piano), Yissy Garcia (drums), Magdelys Savigne (vocals, batá drums, congas); Elizabeth Rodriguez (vocals, violin), and Celia Jiménez (vocals, bass). The group has won one Juno Award (Best Group Jazz Album of the Year in 2014 for its debut CD) and garnered two Grammy nominations, while Bunnett herself has won four additional Juno Awards.

== Honors and awards ==
In 2004, Bunnett was appointed an Officer of the Order of Canada, the highest civilian honour given in this country, granted to Canadian citizens 'for outstanding achievement and service to the country or to humanity at large.'

== Personal life ==
Bunnett is married to another musician, trumpeter Larry Cramer. They reside in Toronto but have traveled to Cuba for musical collaborations for more than 30 years.

Bunnett is also a social activist.

== Discography ==
Artist	Title	Year	Notes
Jane Bunnett	In Dew Time	1988	with Don Pullen and Dewey Redman; Dark Light LP DL-9001
Jane Bunnett/Don Pullen	New York Duets	1989	
Jane Bunnett Quintet	Live at Sweet Basil	1990	with Don Pullen, Billy Hart, Kieran Overs
Jane Bunnett	Spirits of Havana	1991	with Merceditas Valdés, Gonzalo Rubalcaba, Yoruba Andabo
Jane Bunnett	The Water is Wide	1993	with Don Pullen, Billy Hart, Kieran Overs, Jeanne Lee, and Sheila Jordan
Paul Bley/Jane Bunnett	Double Time	1994	
Jane Bunnett	Rendez-Vous Brazil Cuba	1995	
Jane Bunnett	Jane Bunnett and the Cuban Piano Masters	1996	
Various Artists	Havana Flute Summit	1997	
Jane Bunnett & The Spirits of Havana	Chamalongo	1997	
Jane Bunnett & The Spirits of Havana	Ritmo + Soul	2000	
Jane Bunnett	Alma de Santiago	2001	Juno Award nomination for Best Global recording and Grammy Award nomination for Best Latin Jazz recording
Stanley Cowell and Jane Bunnett	Spirituals and Dedications	2002	
Jane Bunnett	Cuban Odyssey	2002	Juno Award nomination for Best Global recording and Grammy Award nomination for Best Latin Jazz recording
Jane Bunnett	Red Dragonfly (Aka Tombo)	2004	Juno Award nomination for Contemporary Jazz Album of the Year
Jane Bunnett	Radio Guantanamo (Guantanamo Blues Project Vol. 1)	2006	Juno Award winner for Contemporary Jazz Album of the Year
Jane Bunnett	Embracing Voices	2008	
Jane Bunnett & Maqueque	Jane Bunnett & Maqueque	2014	
Jane Bunnett & Maqueque	Oddara	2016	Grammy Award nomination for Best Latin Jazz Album
Jane Bunnett & Maqueque	On Firm Ground/Tierra Firme	2019	
Jane Bunnett & Maqueque	Playing with Fire	2023	
Jane Bunnett & Maqueque	Diez Años	2024	

== List of awards and nominations ==
Year	Award	Category	Title
2009	Juno Award	Contemporary Jazz Album of the Year	Embracing Voices
2006	Juno Award	Contemporary Jazz Album of the Year	Radio Guantanamo Blues Project - Vol. I
2005	Urban Music Award (nomination)	Best Jazz Recording of the Year	Radio Guantanamo Blues Project - Vol. I
2004	Grammy Award (nomination)	Best Latin Jazz Album	Cuban Odyssey
2004	Down Beat Award	USA — Critic's Poll for Rising Star, Flute	
2003	Urban Music Award	Best Global Recording	Cuban Odyssey
2003	American Jazz Writers’ Association Award	Best Latin Jazz Album	Cuban Odyssey
2003	Juno Award (nomination)	Best Global Recording	Cuban Odyssey
2003	Grammy Award (nomination)	Best Latin Jazz Recording	Cuban Odyssey
2003	Jazz Journalists Award	Best Latin Jazz Album of the Year	Cuban Odyssey
2003	Juno Award (nomination)	Best Contemporary Jazz Album	Spirituals & Dedications
2003	Grammy Award (nomination)	Best Latin Jazz Album	Alma De Santiago
2003	Down Beat Award	Staff/Readers Poll for Rising Star, Flute/Saxophone	
2002	Juno Award (nomination)	Best Global Recording	Alma De Santiago
2002	Smithsonian Institution Award		"for contributions and dedication to the development of Latin Jazz"
2002	Grammy Award (nomination)	Best Latin Jazz Recording	Alma De Santiago
2002	Canadian National Jazz Award	Saxophonist of the Year	
2002	Down Beat Award	Critics’ Poll for Deserving of Wider Recognition, Flute	
2002	Jazz Journalists Award	Best Latin Jazz Record	Alma De Santiago
2001	Jazz Journalists Award (nomination)	Best Soprano Saxophonist	
2001	Down Beat Award	Critics’ Poll for Deserving of Wider Recognition, Flute	
1994	Village Voice Award	Best Record of the Year	The Water is Wide
1992	Juno Award	Best Jazz Album	Spirits of Havana
1991	All-Music Guide Award	One of the Top 300 Jazz Discs of All Time	Spirits of Havana
1988	Juno Award (nomination)		In Dew Time
