= Teatro Principal de la Comedia =

The Teatro Principal de la Comedia was a theatre in Havana Cuba with 834 seats which was a major venue from its opening 1921 until demolition in 1956. It was located at calle Ánimas No. 2 between Zulueta and Prado. The theatre's first production on 29 October 1921 was the 1894 play La de San Quintín, by Benito Pérez Galdós, presented by María Palau and Felipe Sassone.
