= Eliseo Grenet =

Cuban pianist, composer and arranger (1893–1950)

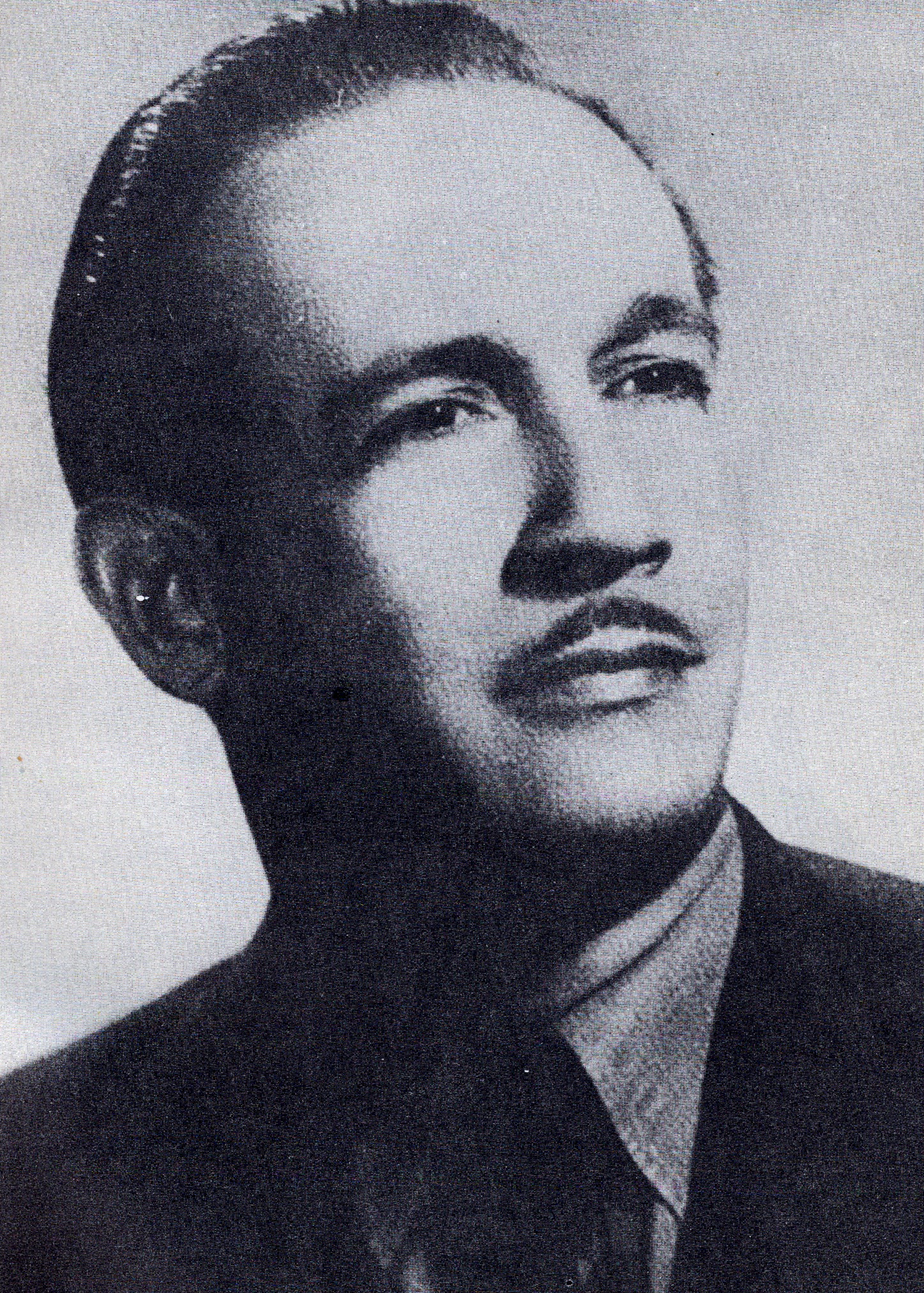
- Born: June 12, 1893; Havana
- Died: December 4, 1950 (aged 57)
- Other name: The Irving Berlin of Cuba

Eliseo Grenet Sánchez (12 June 1893 – 4 December 1950) was a Cuban pianist and a leading composer/arranger of the day. He composed music for stage shows and films, and some famous Cuban dance music. Eliseo was one of three musical brothers, all composers, the others being Emilio ('Neno', 1901–1941) and Ernesto (1908–1981). Emilio went on composing even after having a leg bitten off by a shark in 1930; Ernesto was a drummer who became leader of the Tropicana's orchestra.

== Life & work ==
Grenet was born in Havana. He began piano lessons at the age of five, with his mother as an instructor. He entered Cuba's National Conservatory at the age of ten. Eliseo studied music under Mercedes Valenzuela and Leandro Simón Guergué, the father of Moisés Simons. In 1905 he played piano in the silent film theatre La Caricatura, and in 1909, he directed the orchestra of the Politeama Habanero theatre, which mostly showed zarzuelas. Later he joined the company of Regino López at the Teatro Cubano.

In 1925 Grenet founded a jazz band which played in the cabaret Montmartre and the Jockey Club. The line-up included Grenet (piano); Manolo Castro (alto sax); José Ramón Betancourt (tenor sax); Pedro Mercado (trumpet); Jorge Bolet (piano sub); Enrique Santiesteban (percussion and singer). In 1927 came the premiere of the zarzuela La Niña Rita, o La Habana de 1830 at the Teatro Regina, with music by Grenet and Ernesto Lecuona. In this zarzuela, Grenet's number, the tango-congo Ay, Mamá Inéz, became a huge hit, and remains popular today and is often heard at wedding receptions. Its origins lie in a comparsa number of 1868, and in its new guise became one of the signature numbers for the vedette Rita Montaner. In 1930 he set a number of Nicolas Guillén's poems Motivos del son to music.

Grenet left Cuba for Barcelona, Spain in 1932 after falling foul of some of Gerardo Machado's henchmen, for the lyric of his Lamento cubano, which had the line:

Ay Cuba hermosa, primorosa, por qué sufres hoy tantos quebrantos? (Beautiful Cuba, why do you suffer such troubles [disruption] today?)

He returned after Machado was forced out of office. Whilst abroad in Spain he directed the orchestra for the operetta La virgen morena, in Barcelona. Next, in Paris, he directed the same work. In Paris, too, he played piano at La Cueva, the nightclub he partly owned, in the resident band of Julio Cueva. There he joined his brother Ernesto, who played percussion. It was here that playing La comparsa de los congos, that he realized the potential of this carnival rhythm. It has been said that he introduced the conga to America, and this may or may not be true. The Lecuona Cuban Boys, a touring band, were writing and playing congas at the same time.

In 1936 he founded the night-club El Yumurí, on Broadway and 52nd St, New York City. This which featured a local Puerto Rican group led by Pedro Flores, and a cabaret. In 1938 Grenet presented the review La Conga in his club, and later put on a spectacular at the Teatro Hispano in New York, with the leading Cuban singer Panchito Riset (Havana, 21 October 1911–New York, 8 August 1988).

=== Summary of main compositions ===
Grenet wrote, arranged and sometimes directed music for a number of musical stage shows and films, and recorded for Columbia Records and Brunswick Records. Overall, his style and influence was part of the afrocubanismo movement between the two world wars.

==== Film music ====
He wrote film music for La Princesa Tam-tam, starring Josephine Baker (Paris); Escándalo de estrellas, Conga bar and Estampas coloniales featuring Miguelito Valdés, (México City); Milonga de arrabal, (Buenos Aires); Noches cubanas, (New York); and Susana tiene un secreto, (Barcelona).

==== Lyric theatre ====
Music for the following zarzuelas and other musical theatre: La toma de Veracruz, premiered in 1914 in the Teatro Alhambra (Havana), Bohemia, Como las golondrinas, El mendigo, El santo del hacendado, El submarino cubano, El tabaquero (libretto: Arquimedes Pous), La camagüeyana (premiered in Barcelona 1935), La virgen morena, Mi peregrina maldita, La Niña Rita, o La Habana en 1830, music co-authored with Ernesto Lecuona.

==== Recorded pieces ====
Grenet wrote, amongst many other numbers, Las perlas de tu boca, El sitierito, Lamento esclavo, Tabaco verde, La comparsa de los congos, La mora, México, La princesa tam-tam, Papá Montero, Rica pulpa, Mi vida es cantar, Lamento cubano, Negro bembón, Tu no sabe inglé, Sóngoro cosongo, Ay! Mamá Inés (aka "Mama Inez") .
