= Afrocubanismo =

Cuban social and cultural movement

Afrocubanismo was an artistic and social movement in black-themed Cuban culture with origins in the 1920s, as in works by the cultural anthropologist Fernando Ortiz. The Afrocubanismo movement focused on establishing the legitimacy of black identity in Cuban society, culture, and art. The movement developed in the interwar period when white intellectuals in Cuba acknowledged openly the significance of African culture in Cuba. Afro-Cuban artistic expressions helped integrate the marginalized black community into mainstream Cuban society and art. Since its inception, Afro-Cuban Humanities has emerged as a major area of collegiate studies, and Afrocubanismo's influences can be seen in Cuban literature, painting, music, theater, and sculpture.

== Background ==
Racial dynamics between black and white Cubans had been tense in the decades leading up to the movement's inception in the early 20th century. Slavery in Cuba was abolished in October 1886. Prior to the movement, the Afro-Cuban population struggled with fragmentation and an unbalanced social hierarchy. The Afro-Cuban population consisted of working slaves, freed slaves, and a small number of black middle-class elites and intellectuals. The disparities within the black community were exacerbated by the systematic mistreatment and racist policies inflicted upon them by White Cubans.

In the 1912 Race War (guerrita del doce), civil war erupted between Afro-Cuban farmers and protesters versus Cuban armed forces and White militias. Conflict broke out after Afro-Cuban protesters attempted to stage uprisings out of frustration due to failed protests to stop a law prohibiting black political parties. The end result was the death of an estimated 2,000 to 6,000 Afro-Cuban farmers and workers.

Even after abolition, Afro-Cubans were barred from higher education, white-collar professions, government positions, bars, restaurants, clubs, and given restricted access to public spaces like parks and recreation areas. Afro-Cuban frustration was further worsened by the fact that many had anticipated inclusion and progressive change after Cuba’s War of Independence against Spain, where the majority of Cuba’s armed forces consisted of black and mixed-race soldiers, many of whom were slaves and former slaves. In spite of their efforts in the War of Independence, Afro-Cubans were outraged at the failure of Cuban legislature to enact policies that would benefit the black population. It wasn't until the establishment of universal male suffrage that White Cubans had to acknowledge the value of the Afro-Cuban citizen, since the black population now made up 30 percent of Cuba’s total voting population.

In addition to the political and economic hostilities between the two racial groups, White Cuban attitudes towards Black and African culture were bitter and hostile. Many White Cuban authors held contempt for African customs and traditions. Fernando Ortiz, the founder and advocate of Afro-Cuban studies, described African art and cultural practices in his earlier writings as “infantile,” “barbaric,” “primitive,” “savage,” and “repugnant.” White Cuban nationalists described African expression as an infection that was invading Cuban culture.

== Origin of Afrocubanismo ==
Although thought of mainly as a black phenomenon, the roots of Afrocubanismo originated from White Cuban interests. Afrocubanismo was first developed by formally trained White Cuban elites, not Afro-Cubans. White Afrocubanista art typically depicted black subjects using highly stylized forms. White Cubans appropriated the aesthetics of African art and altered them using Euro-centric techniques and philosophies of aesthetic beauty. White Afrocubanistas were not concerned with accurately portraying Afro-Cuban life or customs. Rather, these Euro-Cubans sought to make traditional elements of African art more palatable for mainstream Cuban society. In an essay entitled "Uniting Blacks in a raceless nation," author Arnedo-Gomez describes this cultural appropriation by White Cubans explaining, “...the movement accommodated and folklorised Afro-Cuban... forms in order to make them acceptable within the dominant European-derived tradition...”

Afro-Cuban responses to White Afrocubanista art were conflicted and ranging. Some members of the black middle class opposed the white portrayals of black identity and culture, finding them racist and derogatory. Some members of the black middle class found merit in the Euro-centric interpretations of African culture. In fact, many Afro-Cuban intellectuals embraced some of the more problematic and questionable elements of the underlying white nationalist beliefs brought to Afrocubanismo by White elitists. Still other Afro-Cubans found that Afrocubanista art, in spite of racist depictions, opened opportunities for Black Cuban art forms to become part of the Cuban cultural sphere. All of these factors contributed to what Arnedo-Gomez calls the “reformulation” of Afrocubanismo. According to Gomez, Afro-Cubans repurposed Afrocubanista art to move away from the stereotypical portrayals that White Afrocubanista artists depicted. Black middle class and working class Afro-Cubans contributed their own influences. “Afrocubanismo was... 'an ideological and cultural product that was neither stable, nor coherent' and... open to divergent interpretations.”

== Major Themes ==
While rooted in White ideologies and problematic conceptualizations of African culture, the Afro-Cuban perspective on the themes of the movement were more concerned with social justice, equality, and questioning of the status quo. The purposes behind Afrocubanismo’s various expressions were different. For some White Cubans, the significance of Afro-Cubanismo was the revalorization of African art as an expression of Cuban identity. Some scholars, like Fernando Ortiz, advocated that Afrocubanismo and African derived art forms were important for the anthropological pursuit of acknowledging the history behind Cuban identity in all forms. These White Afrocubanistas idealized the concept of a "raceless" Cuba where all its citizens shared a single national identity. The problem for Afro-Cubans with this idealized view of Afrocubanismo and race was that it trivialized the experiences of blacks in Cuba and ignored the serious systemic racial issues underpinning Cuban interracial relations. “...Ortiz can be cited from the mid-1930s onwards referring to Afrocuban arts as "an abandoned [cultural] treasure," something of value to be carefully studied and protected, and is in vocal in his support of the analysis of all forms of Afrocuban music and literature.” Even in his notably racist earlier works that attack African customs, Ortiz inadvertently captured the depth, complexity, and richness of African cultural practices and expression. “...Ortiz even in this earliest study provide[d] detailed descriptions of African-derived deities, their personalities, their iconic representations, the altars and shrines devoted to them, the religious ritual associated with their worship, and the songs and dances incorporated into such worship. Indeed, the majority of Ortiz's study mutely testifies to the complexity and poetic cohesiveness of the religious beliefs which he condemns as savage and dangerous.”

Black Afrocubanistas were less focused on describing and idealizing African art and more concerned with capturing the reality of African life. The poetry of Nicholás Guillén, an Afro-Cuban poet, celebrates black street culture and music. Afro-Cuban literature of the 1930s was often political and served as a form of protest and criticism of the dominant White nationalism of Cuba. Afro-Cuban visual arts too served as a statement against the homogeneity of White Cuban culture. Many black Afrocubanista artists used their art to counter the ideals of equality and the perceived unity among blacks and whites that White Cubans claimed existed. Afro-Cuban art served to question the ideologies of White Cubans. "…Guillen’s poetry celebrated black street culture and Arozarena and Pedroso ‘chant to workers and the dispossessed and criticise what Arozarena described as the bourgeois conception of Afro-Cuban culture’.

Some Afro-Cuban poets and artists actually rejected the term “Afro-Cuban” and its use as a classifying term for African-derived art. Nicholas Guillen and Arredondo, two black Afrocubanismo authors, rejected the term because it felt constructed, it separated between categories of black Cuban and white Cuban, and it made the goal of a single unified mulatto Cuban identity impossible. In this sense, themes of Afrocubanismo also include this type of anti-Afro-Cuban perspectives held by some black intellectuals. Afro-Cuban literature was often written to express criticism over the prevalent racism and glossing over of social issues of racial inequality.

== Major artists ==
- Fernando Ortiz: A White Cuban author and advocate of Afrocuban studies.
- Nicholas Guillen: an Afro-Cuban poet
- Alberto Pena: Afrocuban painter
- Teodoro Ramos Blanco: Afro-Cuban sculptor
- Andres Alvarez Naranjo: Afro-Cuban sculptor
- Angel Pinto: Afro-Cuban author and critic
