= Fernando Ortiz Fernández =

Cuban scholar of Afro-Cuban culture (1881–1969)

Fernando Ortiz Fernández (16 July 1881 – 10 April 1969) was a Cuban lawyer, essayist, anthropologist, ethnomusicologist and scholar of Afro-Cuban culture. Ortiz was a prolific polymath dedicated to exploring, recording, and understanding all aspects of indigenous Cuban culture. Ortiz has been called the "third discoverer of Cuba", after Christopher Columbus and Alexander von Humboldt. A title first given to him by his secretary Rubén Martínez Villena and later echoed and published by Juan Marinello. Ortiz is widely recognized as a pioneering figure in postcolonial Latin American thought, as well as a foundational voice in African American anthropology. One of Ortiz's most influential contributions is his coining of the term "transculturation," which describes the complex process of cultural convergence and exchange.

== Early life and education ==
Ortiz was born in Havana. He was son of Don Rosendo Ortiz y Zorrilla and Doña Josefa Fernández y González del Real.

When he was two years old he moved with her mother to Menorca where he spent most of his youth. He completed his primary and secondary studies and obtained his high school diploma in 1895. That year, he relocated to Havana where he began studying law. Four years later, in 1899, he returned to Spain, where he completed his studies and earned a law degree at the University of Barcelona in 1900. In 1901 he received his title of Doctor of Law at the Central University of Madrid with a thesis on penal law that was later published in the journal Derecho y Sociología. In 1902 he returned to Habana and received the title of Doctor of Civil Law and Doctor of Public Law.

== Career ==
Disillusioned with politics in the early period of Cuban history and having been a member of President Gerardo Machado's Liberal Party, and a Liberal member of its House of Representatives from 1917 to 1922, he became active in the early nationalist civic revival movement.

Throughout his life Ortiz was involved in the foundation of institutions dedicated to the study of Cuban culture. In 1907 he became member of Sociedad Económica de Amigos del País de Cuba (Economic Societies of Friends of the Country), the he eventually led in 1923. He was the cofounder of the Cuban Academy of the Language in 1926 and the cofounder of the Sociedad de Folklore Cubano (1928). In 1937 he founded the Sociedad de Estudios Afrocubanos (Society of Afro-Cuban Studies) and the journal Estudios Afrocubanos (Afro-Cuban Studies). He was president of the History Academia of Cuba and the Cuban-Soviet Institute (1945).

He was also the founder and director of the Instituto Internacional de Estudios Afroamericanos (International Institute for the Study of Afroamericans), an institute dedicated to promoting scientific research on Afro-descended populations in the Americas, focusing on their biological and cultural aspects. The institute organized conferences, conducted studies, and served as a hub for the dissemination of research and collaboration among scholars and institutions. He later invited American anthropologist and sociologist W.E.B. Du Bois to join the institute, along with other renowned anthropologists like Melville Herskovits.

Ortiz also dedicated a significant part of his life to founding, editing, and contributing to academic journals. He resumed the publication of Revista Bimestre Cubana in 1910, serving as its director until 1959, the year the Cuban Revolution began. He also edited Revista de administración teórica y práctica del Estado, la provincia y el municipio (1912) and Boletín de Legislación (1929). In 1924, he founded Revista Archivos del Folklore Cubano. Additionally, he was the founder and editor of Surco (1930–1931) and Ultra (1936–1947), both journals that provided commentary on international publications.

Ortiz was professor of African American anthropologist Irene Diggs when she was doing her PhD in anthropology at University of Havana.

Ortiz published articles in several prominent journals, including The Hispanic American Historical Review, Revista Científica Internacional, Revista de Administración, Revista de Arqueología y Etnología, and Revista de La Habana. He also helped establish important journals such as Revista Bimestre Cubana, Archivos del Folklore Cubano, and Estudios Afrocubanos.

Ortiz also developed a theory of activism within Cuba's political system. He said that Afro-Cubans had been characterized negatively based on their African descent, and traits said to be "primitive." He wanted to show the true nature of their culture: its language, music and other arts.

His books, La Africania de la Musica Folklorica de Cuba (1950), and Los Instrumentos de la Musica Afrocubana (1952 - 1955) are still regarded as key references in the study of Afro-Cuban music.

In his second marriage, Fernando Ortiz married María Herrera (1942), who remained by his side for the rest of his life. María was a close collaborator in Ortiz's work.

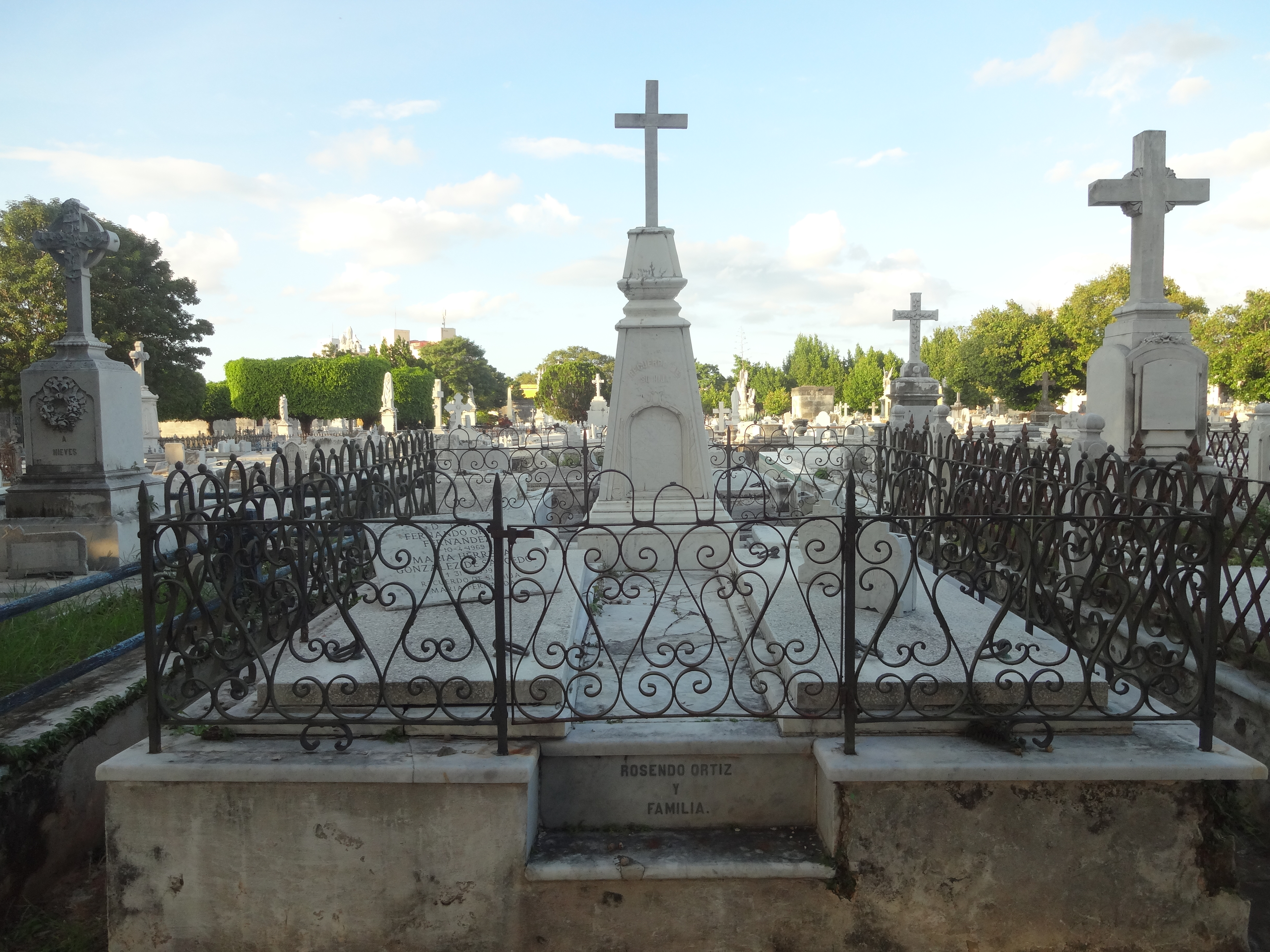
Ortíz's grave at the Cementerio de Cristóbal Colón in Havana, Cuba

Fernando Ortiz died in Havana in 1969 and was interred there in the Colon Cemetery.

== Cuban Counterpoints and the concept of Transculturation ==
Fernando Ortiz's most known and read book was Cuban Counterpoint: Tobacco and Sugar originally published in 1940 in Spanish and translated to English in 1995. In his book he draws comparisons between sugar and tobacco the most relevant products form Cuba that have entered the daily life of Cubans.

In this work, he proposes the concept of transculturation as a phenomenon that is more appropriate than acculturation to describe how cultures converge and merge, without removing some of the original aspects of the original cultures. The concept provided a more appropriate way to explain the merging of cultures in Cuba, from Spanish colonialism to Indigenous communities and Afro-Cubans, resulting in a new culture that incorporates elements from each. In the introduction of the book the Polish anthropologist Bronisław Malinowski (1884–1942) wrote the introduction supporting Ortiz's concept His correspondence with Bronisław Malinowski shows they had numerous debates around the concept of transculturation and how it was being received within American anthropology. This led to disputes between Oritz and Melville Herskovits the American anthropologist that coined the term acculturation. The concept of transculturation that Ortiz developed resonates with the principles of British functionalism, which Malinowski himself helped pioneer.

Malinowski was not only a personal friend but also an admirer of Ortiz's work. The letters published between Malinowski and Ortiz as part of a 2002 edition of Cuban Counterpoints, by Enrico Mario Santí, show that Malinowski commented the structure of the book, proposed ideas and concepts that influenced the book.

== Legacy and honors ==
After Ortiz's death the government established the Fernando Ortiz Foundation, in September 1995. Its main objectives are the study and dissemination of the life and work of Fernando Ortiz, as well as the development of academic research on Cuban cultural identity. It has also published images, documents and reprints of Ortiz's work and devoted itself to studies of ethnology, sociology and Cuba's popular traditions. Since 1995 it has been led by one of his prominent students, Miguel Barnet, known for his development of the testimonial style in ethnographic studies. The Foundation has fostered scholarly discussions around many cultural issues, including the survival of elements of racism and racial prejudice, and development of measures to deal with such problems.

== Bibliography ==
- Los negros brujos (1906)
- La inmigración desde el punto de vista criminológico (1906)
- Los mambises italianos (1909)
- Las rebeliones de los afrocubanos (1910)
- Seamos hoy como fueron ayer (1914)
- Los negros esclavos (1916)
- Los cabildos afrocubanos (1921)
- Un catauro de cubanismos: Apuntes lexicográficos (1923)
- Glosario de afronegrismos (1924)
- El cocorícamo y otros conceptos teoplásmicos del folklore afrocubano (1930)
- De la música afrocubana; un estímulo para su estudio (1934)
- Contrapunteo cubano del tabaco y el azúcar (1940; trans. Cuban Counterpoint: Tobacco and Sugar, 1995)
- Las cuatro culturas indias de Cuba (1943)
- El engaño de la razas (The deceit of races), (1946)
- La Africania de la musica folklorica de Cuba (1950); “The Africanness of Folkloric Cuban Music”)
- Los bailes y el teatro de los negros en el folklore de Cuba (1951; “The Dances and Theatre of Blacks in Cuban Folklore”).
- Los instrumentos de la musica afrocubana (1952–1955)
- Ni racismo ni xenofobia (1955)
- Historia de una pelea cubana contra los demonios (1959); “History of A Cuban Struggle Against the Demons” (1959)
- Nuevo catauro de cubanismos (1985) (posthumous)
- Los negros curros (1986) (posthumous)
