= Afro-Cubans =

Ethnic minority in Cuba

Afro-Cubans Black Cubans
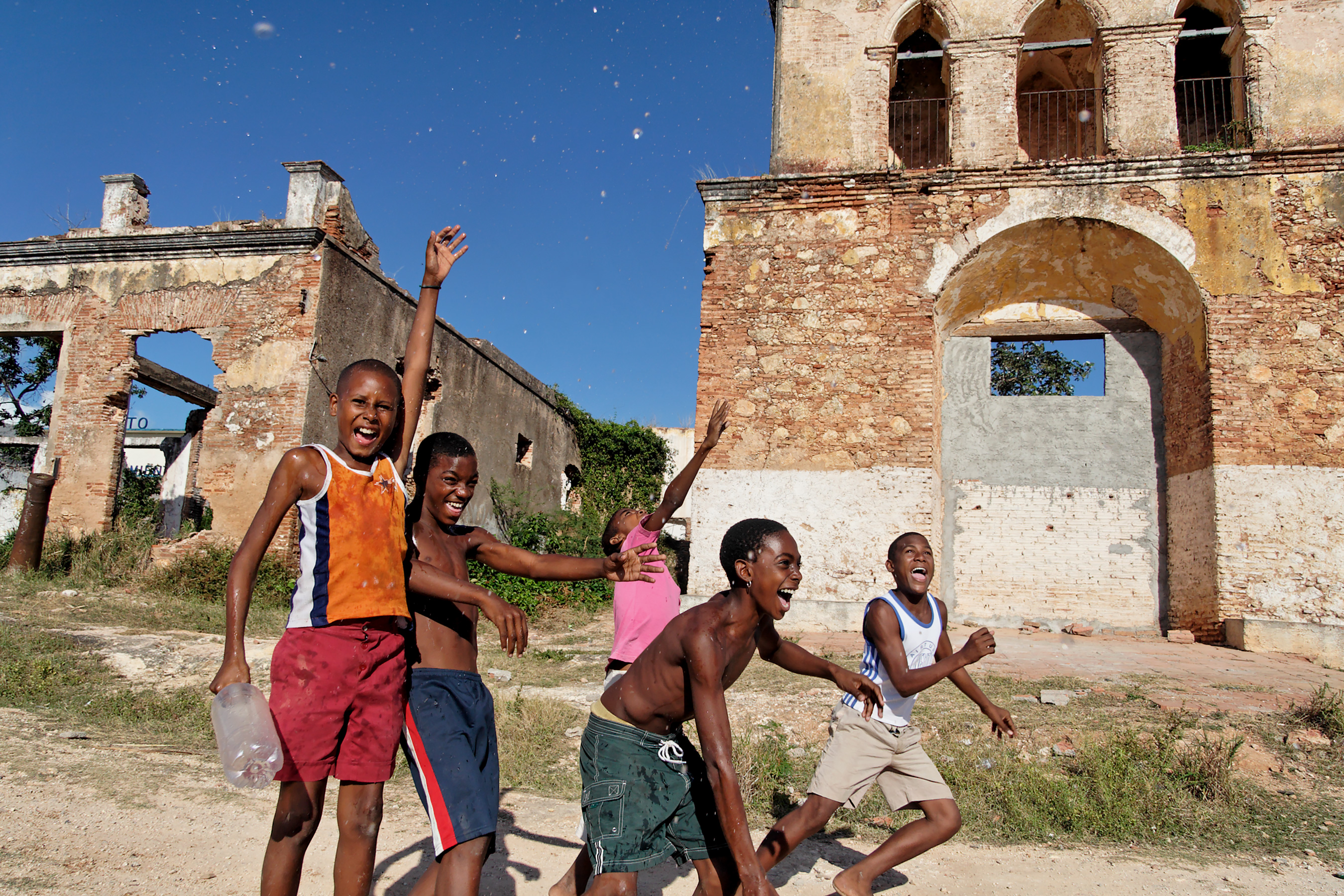
- Afro-Cuban children

Total population
- ▼1,034,044 (9.26% of the Cuban Population) (2012)

Regions with significant populations
- Havana, Eastern Cuba

Languages
- Spanish, Lucumí, Habla Congo, English, Portuguese, French, Haitian Creole, Cuban Sign Language

Religion
- Afro-Cuban religions Abakuá, Arará religion, Cuban Vodú, Palo, Santería; Popular religions Predominantly Roman Catholic with Protestant minorities

Related ethnic groups
- Yoruba people, Arará, Fang people, Bubi people, Cape Verdean Cuban, Ganga-Longoba, Afro-Haitians, Haitian Cuban, Africans, Afro-Dominicans, Afro–Puerto Ricans, Bakongo people, Mandinka people

Afro-Cubans (Spanish: Afrocubano) or Black Cubans are citizens of Cuba who have ancestry from any of the Black racial groups originating from Africa. The term Afro-Cuban can also refer to historical or cultural elements in Cuba associated with this community, and the combining of native African and other cultural elements found in Cuban society, such as race, religion, music, language, the arts and class culture.

== African origins ==
The ethnogenesis of Afro-Cubans began with the transatlantic slave trade, when enslaved Africans were trafficked to the island by European slave traders. Following the Spanish conquest of Cuba in the early 16th century, the Spaniards had begun to rely on the native Tainos for slave labour by the mid-1500s. However, the Taino population was unsuitable for this, due to the declining numbers. Thus, the Spaniards began importing enslaved Africans onto the island to work on plantations. This started Cuba's involvement in the Atlantic Slave Trade.

The enslaved Africans brought to Cuba were mainly from West Africa, with a lesser but significant amount also coming from Central Africa. This includes all the territory from modern-day Senegal to modern-day Angola. Many of these enslaved people were obtained from wars and conflicts between and within African states. Others were criminals and debtors condemned to slavery. Between 702,000 and 1 million enslaved African people were brought to Cuba during this period.

Over 20 distinct African ethnic groups were brought to Cuba during the history of slavery on the island. Of these 20, the main 6 were the: Lucumi (Yoruba), Mandingo, Ganga (Sierra Leone), Arará (Gbe speaking people of Dahomey and Allada), Karabali (the peoples of and around Calabar, in eastern Nigeria), and Congo (mainly Bakongo).

These ethnic groups were brought to Cuba in large numbers at different periods, due to the political and civil conditions of their societies. Between 1760 and 1790, the Bakongo were the largest African ethnicity, making up 30% of the (African-born) slave population. Between 1665 and 1760, the Kingdom of Kongo experienced a series of civil wars, due to succession disputes between two rival dynasties, which made many Bakongo vulnerable to the slave trade. The Arará slaves arrived as war prisoners from Dahomey, captured by the Oyo during the war between the Oyo Empire and the Kingdom of Dahomey in the 18th century. Meanwhile, the significant Yoruba population in Cuba started to arrive in the mid-1700s, due to the increased warfare in the Oyo Empire, which led to its decline and eventual collapse. They were the largest imported ethnic group after 1850, making up 34.5% of all incoming slaves. The Carabali consisted of many ethnic groups from eastern Nigiera, which embarked from the Bight of Biafra. They included ethnic groups such as the Efik, Ekoi, and Igbo, etc.

Between 1790 and 1880, 6917 enslaved Africans were brought to Cuba up until the abolition of slavery on the island in 1886.

Of the enslaved African population brought to Cuba during this 90 year period, the Congo people were the most numerous with a population of 1901. The second most populous ethnicity were the Karabali, with 1873 people. Then the Ganga at 1118, the Lucumi at 640, the Mandingo at 663, and 712 unknown ethnicities.

Some of the African ethnicities of Cuba retained their own cultural identity and syncretised it with the Catholic religion of the Spanish. This led to the formation of Santeria (a Yoruba-derived religion), Palo (a Kongo-derived religion), Abakuá (an Efik-derived religion), and Arará (a Dahomey-derived religion).

== Demographics ==
Black Cubans 1953–2011
Year	Population	% of Cuba
1774	50,249	29.28%
1792	94,380	▲34.45%
1817	221,766	▲40.10%
1841	490,305	▲48.66%
1899	234,738	▼14.92%
1907	274,272	▼13.39%
1919	323,117	▼11.18%
1931	437,769	▼11.05%
1943	463,227	▼9.69%
1953	725,311	▲12.44%
1981	1,168,695	▼12.02%
2002	1,126,894	▼10.08%
2012	1,034,044	▼9.26%
Source: Cuba census.

According to the 2002 national census that surveyed 11.2 million Cubans, 1 million or 11% of Cubans identified as Afro-Cuban or Black. Some 3 million identified as "mulatto" or "mestizo", meaning of mixed race, primarily a combination of African and European. Thus more than 40% of the population on the island affirm some African ancestry.

There has been much scholarly discussion about the demographic composition of the island. A study by the Institute for Cuban and Cuban-American Studies at the University of Miami estimated the proportion of people as having some black ancestry is more likely about 62%. They note that complex attitudes toward racial identification, and the de facto racial hierarchy that has existed on the island, have influenced the lower figures of self-identification as black.

In Cuba, there are many terms to classify Afro-Cubans of varying portions of African descent, related to the historic Spanish casta system. In addition, in current society, classification may simply be made based on visible attributes; thus, a person who looks white is likely classified as white, especially if educated and middle class.

By contrast, in the contemporary United States, a 2010 Harvard study showed that the practice of hypodescent classification persists. That is, biracial persons are typically classified by others as belonging to the race or ethnicity with lower social status, even if their ancestry is majority European. They found that persons with up to 69% European ancestry and the remainder African or African-American were still being classified as 'black'.

A DNA study in 2014 estimated the genetic admixture of the population of Cuba to be 72% European, 20% African and 8% Native American.

Although Afro-Cubans can be found throughout Cuba, they comprise a higher proportion of the population in Oriente Province in Eastern Cuba than in other parts of the island. As the biggest city, Havana has the largest population of Afro-Cubans of any city in Cuba.

In the 21st century, many native African immigrants have been going to Cuba, especially from Angola. Also, immigrants from Jamaica and Haiti have been settling in Cuba. Most of them settle in the eastern part of the island, due to its proximity to their home countries, and further contributing to the already high percentage of ethnic blacks on that side of the island.

The percentage of Afro-Cubans on the island increased after the 1959 Cuban revolution led by Fidel Castro, because there was mass migration from the island of the largely white (or ethnic European) Cuban professional class, who were subject to violence, takeovers and losing their businesses and property.

A small percentage of Afro-Cubans left Cuba, mostly for the United States (particularly Florida). They and their U.S.-born children are known variously as Afro-Cuban Americans, Cuban Americans, Hispanic Americans, and African Americans. Relatively few Afro-Cubans resided in the nearby Spanish-speaking country of Dominican Republic and the U.S. territory of Puerto Rico.

The Minority Rights Group International says that "An objective assessment of the situation of Afro-Cubans remains problematic due to scant records and a paucity of systematic studies both pre- and post-revolution".

=== Afro-Cuban descendants in Africa ===
During the 17th century, ex-slaves from Cuba and Brazil were transported to Africa to work for colonists as indentured servants or workers. They were taken largely to present-day Nigeria, the home of the Yoruba cultures, and Spanish Guinea (present-day Equatorial Guinea) home of the Fang and Bubi cultures.

In the 19th century, the former slaves were taken to Africa under the Royal Orders of September 13, 1845 (by way of voluntary arrangement). When there were an insufficient number of volunteers, the colonial government arranged a June 20, 1861, deportation from Cuba. In Spanish Guinea, the indentured servants became part of the Emancipados. In the area of present-day Nigeria, they were called Amaros.

Although the indentured workers were nominally free to return to Cuba when their tenure was over, most settled in these countries, marrying into the local African indigenous tribes.

Angola has had more recent immigrant communities of Afro-Cubans, known as Amparos. They are descendants of Afro-Cuban soldiers who were transported to serve as military in the country in 1975 as a result of Cuban involvement in the Cold War. Cuba's Prime Minister, Fidel Castro, deployed thousands of troops to the country during the Angolan Civil War to support a faction of society. As a result of this era, a small Spanish-speaking community formed in Angola of Afro-Cubans; they number about 100,000 persons.

=== Haitian-Cubans ===
Haitian Creole language and culture first entered Cuba with the arrival of immigrants from Saint-Domingue at the start of the 19th century. This was a French colony on the island of Hispaniola. The violence associated with the final years of the 1791–1804 Haitian Revolution resulted in a wave of ethnic French settlers fleeing to Cuba, and often taking numerous African slaves with them. These refugees settled mainly in the east, and especially Guantánamo. There the French later introduced sugar cane cultivation, and constructed sugar refineries. They also developed coffee plantations for another important commodity crop.

By 1804, some 30,000 Frenchmen were living in Baracoa and Maisí, the furthest eastern municipalities of the province. Later, Afro-Haitians continued to emigrate to Cuba to work as braceros (Spanish for "manual laborers") cutting cane in the fields and processing it during harvest. Their living and working conditions were not much better than under slavery. Although many workers had planned to return to Haiti, most stayed on in Cuba.

For years, many Haitians and their descendants in Cuba did not identify as such or speak Creole, which is based in French and African languages. In the eastern part of the island, many Haitians suffered discrimination among the majority Spanish speakers.

In the 21st century, classes in Haitian Creole are offered in Guantanamo, Matanzas and the City of Havana, in an effort to preserve the traditional language of the Afro-Haitians. There is also a Creole-language radio program.

== Religion ==
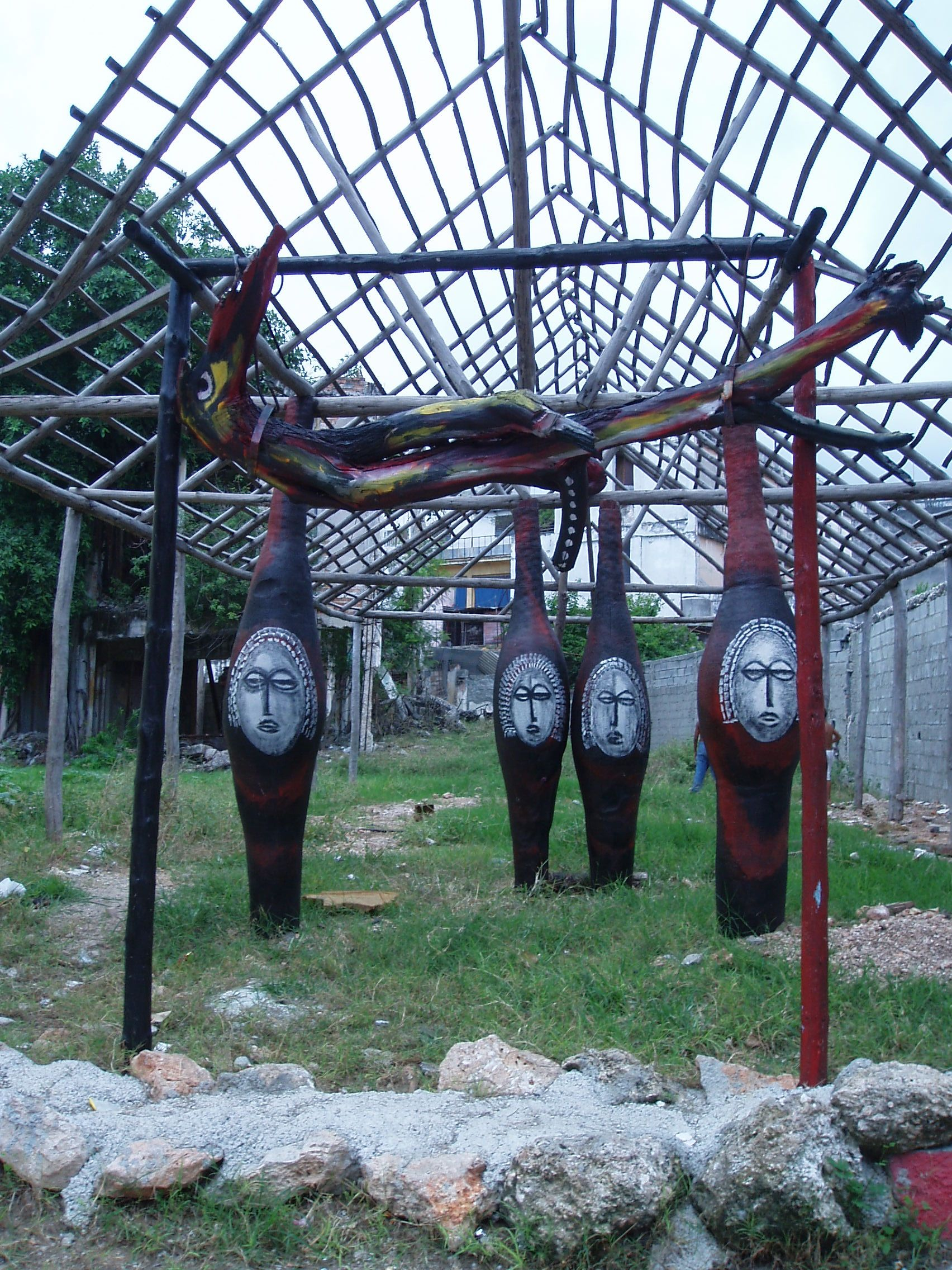
Santería icons at an open place of worship in Havana. Santería is a syncretism practiced by many Afro-Cubans

Afro-Cubans are predominantly Roman Catholic, with Protestant minorities. Afro-Cuban religion can be broken down into three main currents: Santería, Palo Monte and include individuals of all origins. Santería is syncretized with Roman Catholicism.

== Music ==
Since the mid-19th century, innovations within Cuban music have been attributed to the Afro-Cuban community. Genres such as son, conga, mambo and chachachá combined European influences with sub-Saharan African elements. Cuban music evolved markedly away from the traditional European model towards improvisational African traditions. Afro-Cuban musicians have taken pre-existing genres such as trova, country and rap and added their own realities of life in a socialist country and as black persons. Genres like Nueva Trova are seen as live representations of the revolution and have been affected by Afro-Cuban musicians like Pablo Milanes who included African spirituals in his early repertory. Music in Cuba is encouraged both as a scholarly exercise and a popular enjoyment. To Cubans, music and study of it are integral parts of the revolution. Audiences are proud of mixed ethnicity that makes up the music from the Afro-Cuban community, despite there being a boundary of distrust and uncertainty between Cubans and Afro-Cuban culture.

African music and Afro-Cuban music mutually exchanged rhythmic patterns, melodies, and cultural elements, creating a dynamic musical interchange. African artists, particularly those from the Democratic Republic of Congo and Angola fused Afro-Cuban musical influences with their traditions, crafting distinct sounds. The result was an array of genres popular in West and Central Africa namely Congolese rumba, soukous, mbalax, semba, kizomba, and highlife.

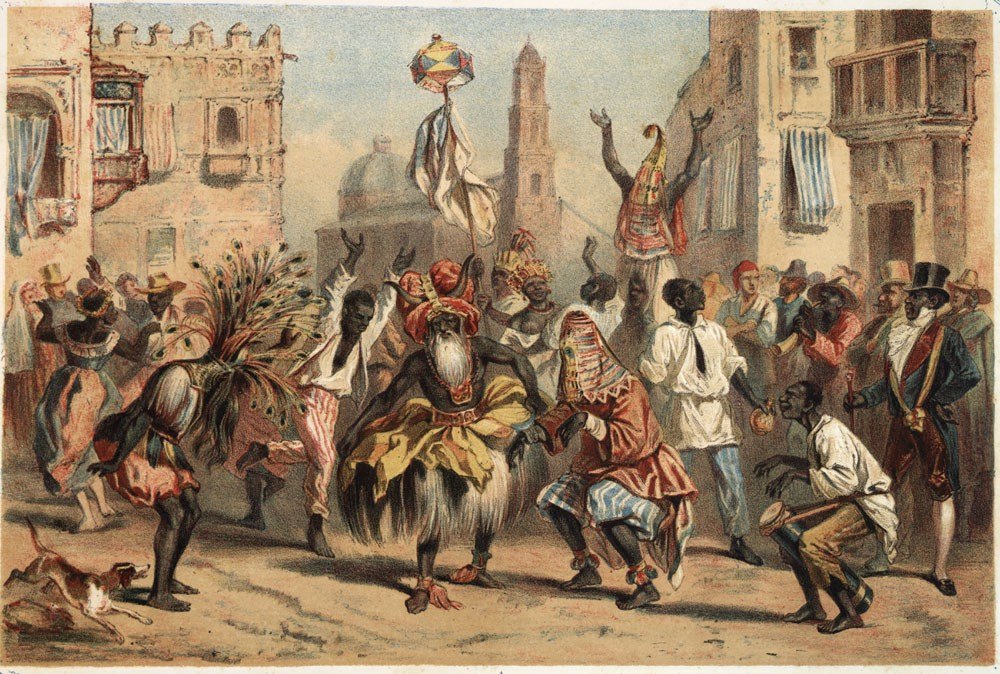
Afro-Cubans celebrating Carnival while incorporating preserved African cultural practices. (1850)

Afro-Cuban music can be divided into religious and profane. Religious music includes the chants, rhythms and instruments used in rituals of the religious currents mentioned above. Profane music includes rumba, guaguancó, comparsa (carnival music) and lesser styles such as the tumba francesa. Virtually all Cuban music is influenced by African rhythms. Cuban popular music, and much of the art music, combines influences from Spain and Africa in ways unique to Cuba. For example son combines African instruments and playing styles with the meter and rhythm of Spanish poetic forms. While much of the music is performed in cut-time, artists typically use an array of time signatures like 6/8 for drumming beats. On the other hand, clave uses a polymetric 7/8 + 5/8 time signature.

Afro-Cuban arts emerged in the early 1960s with musicians spearheading an amateur movement bringing African-influenced drumming to the forefront of Cuban music. For example, Enrique Bonne's drumming ensembles took inspiration from Cuban folklore, traditional trova, dance music, and American Jazz. Pello de Afrokan created a new dance rhythm called Mozambique that increased in popularity after his predominantly afro-Cuban folklore troupe performed in 1964. Afro-Cuban artists Mario Bauzá and Frank Grillo, known as Machito, were influential figures in shaping the Afro-Cuban community and its music. Bauzá, a trumpeter and composer, pioneered the fusion of Afro-Cuban rhythms with jazz, giving rise to the Afro-Cuban jazz movement which gained considerable popularity in the United States, Europe, and the Caribbean in the mid 20th century.

Before the revolution, authorities considered Afro-Cuban religious music a lesser culture; religious drummers were persecuted and instruments were confiscated. After the revolution, Afro-Cuban music could be practiced more openly, but authorities were suspicious due to its relation to Afro-Cuban religions. The first revolutionary institution created for the performing "national folklore" (Afro-Cuban artistic traditions) was Conjunto Folklórico Nacional. Despite official institutional support from the Castro's regime, Afro-Cuban music was treated mostly with ambivalence throughout the second half of the 20th century. Audiences looked down on traditional and religious Afro-Cuban music as primitive and anti-revolutionary, music educators continued pre-revolutionary indifference toward afro-Cuban folklore, and the religious nature of Afro-Cuban music led to criticisms of the government's whitening and de-Africanization of the music. Religious concerts declined, musical instruments related to Santería were confiscated and destroyed, afro-Cuban celebrations were banned outright, and strict limits were placed on the quantity of religious music heard on the radio and television. These attitudes softened in the 1970s and 1980s as the afro-Cuban community began to fuse religious elements into their music. In the 1990s, Afro-Cuban music became a mainstay of Cuba's tourism economy. Members of religious groups earned their living by performing and teaching ritual drumming, song, and dance, to tourists visiting the country.

Rap was adopted in 1999 and solidified with the rise of hip-hop group Orishas. Cuban hip-hop focused on criticism of the Cuban state and the global economic order, including racism, colonialism, imperialism, and global capitalism.

== Language ==
Other cultural elements considered to be Afro-Cuban can be found in language (including syntax, vocabulary, and style of speech).

The Afro-Cuban religions all maintain some degree of use of African languages. Santería and Abakuá both have large parts of their liturgy in African languages (Lucumí and Ñañigo, respectively) while Palo uses a mixture of Spanish and Kikongo, known as Habla Congo.

== Racial consciousness ==
According to anthropologists dispatched by the European Union, racism is entrenched in Cuba. Afro-Cubans are systematically excluded from positions in tourism-related jobs, where they could earn tips in hard currencies. According to the EU study, Afro-Cubans are relegated to poor housing, and African Cubans are excluded from managerial positions.

Enrique Patterson, an Afro-Cuban journalist and former University of Havana professor of Marxist philosophy, describes race as a "social bomb" and says that "If the Cuban government were to permit black Cubans to organize and raise their problems before [authorities] ... totalitarianism would fall". Esteban Morales Domínguez, a professor at the University of Havana, says that "The absence of the debate on the racial problem already threatens ... the revolution's social project". Carlos Moore, who has written extensively on the issue, says: "There is an unstated threat, blacks in Cuba know that whenever you raise race in Cuba, you go to jail. Therefore the struggle in Cuba is different. There cannot be a civil rights movement. You will have instantly 10,000 black people dead. [...] The government is frightened to the extent to which it does not understand black Cubans today. You have a new generation of black Cubans who are looking at politics in another way." Barack Obama's victory has raised disturbing questions about the institutional racism in Cuba. The Economist noted: "The danger starts with his example: after all, a young, black, progressive politician has no chance of reaching the highest office in Cuba, although a majority of the island's people are black."

In the years between the triumph of the revolution and the victory at Playa Girón the Cuban government was one of the world's most proactive regimes in the fight against discrimination. It achieved significant gains in racial equality through a series of egalitarian reforms early in the 1960s. Fidel Castro's first public address on racism after his rise to power was on March 23, 1959, at a labor rally in Havana, less than three months after he defeated Fulgencio Batista. He is quoted as saying: "One of the most just battles that must be fought, a battle that must be emphasized more and more, which I might call the fourth battle – the battle to end racial discrimination at work centers. I repeat: the battle to end racial discrimination at work centers. Of all the forms of racial discrimination the worst is the one that limits the colored Cuban's access to jobs. " Castro pointed to the distinction between social segregation and employment, while placing great emphasis on correcting the latter. In response to the large amount of racism that existed in the job market, Castro issued anti-discrimination laws. In addition, he attempted to close the class gap between wealthy white Cubans and Afro-Cubans with a massive literacy campaign among other egalitarian reforms in the early and mid-1960s. Two years after his 1959 speech at the Havana Labor Rally, Castro declared that the age of racism and discrimination was over. In a speech given at the Confederation of Cuban Workers in observance of May Day, Castro declared that the "just laws of the revolution ended unemployment, put an end to villages without hospitals and schools, enacted laws which ended discrimination, control by monopolies, humiliation, and the suffering of the people." Although inspiring, many would consider the claim to be premature."

Research conducted by Yesilernis Peña, Jim Sidanius and Mark Sawyer in 2003, suggests that social discrimination is still prevalent, despite the low levels of economic discrimination. After considering the issue solved, the Cuban government moved beyond the issue of racism. His message marked a shift in Cuban society's perception of racism that was triggered by the change in government focus." The government's announcement easily allowed the Cuban public to deny discrimination without first correcting the stereotypes that remained in the minds of those who grew up in a Cuba that was racially and economically divided. Many who argue that racism does not exist in Cuba base their claims on the idea of Latin American Exceptionalism. According to the argument of Latin American Exceptionality, a social history of intermarriage and mixing of the races is unique to Latina America. The large mestizo populations that result from high levels of interracial union common to Latin America are often linked to racial democracy. For many Cubans this translates into an argument of "racial harmony", often referred to as racial democracy. In the case of Cuba, ideas of Latin American Exceptionalism have delayed the progress of true racial harmony.

In spite of all the promises and speeches by government leaders, racial discrimination against Afro-Cubans continues to be a major Human Rights issue for the Cuban government, even resulting in riots in Central Havana, a mostly black neighborhood in the capital.

Most of the Latin population of Tampa in the 1950s was working class and lived in restricted areas, ethnic enclaves in the vicinity of Tampa's hundreds of cigar factories. African Cubans were tolerated to an extent in the Latin quarter (where most neighborhoods and cigar factories were integrated). Ybor City and its counterpart, West Tampa, were areas that bordered on other restricted sections-areas for U.S. blacks or whites only. In this Latin quarter, there existed racial discrimination despite its subtleness.

== Afrocubanismo ==
During the 1920s and 1930s Cuba experienced a movement geared towards Afro-Cuban culture called Afrocubanismo. The movement had a large impact on Cuban literature, poetry, painting, music, and sculpture. It was the first artistic campaign in Cuba that focused on one particular theme: African culture. Specifically it highlighted the struggle for independence from Spain, African slavery, and building a purely Cuban national identity. Its goal was to incorporate African folklore and rhythm into traditional modes of art.

=== History of the movement ===
The movement evolved from an interest in the rediscovery of African heritage. It developed in two very different and parallel stages. One stage stemmed from European artists and intellectuals who were interested in African art and musical folk forms. This stage paralleled the Harlem Renaissance in New York, Négritude in the French Caribbean, and coincided with stylistic European Vanguard (like Cubism and its representation of African masks). It was characterized by the participation of white intellectuals such as Cubans Alejo Carpentier, Rómulo Lachatañeré, Fortunato Vizcarrondo, Fernando Ortiz and Lydia Cabrera, Puerto Rican Luis Palés Matos and Spaniards Pablo Picasso and Roger de Lauria. The African-inspired art tended to represent Afro-Cubans with cliché images such as a black man sitting beneath a palm tree with a cigar.

Poems and essays by Afro-Cuban writers began to be published in the 1930s in newspapers, magazines and books, where they discussed their own personal heritage. Afro-Cuban and Afro-Cuban heritage artists such as Nicolás Guillén, Alberto Arredondo and Emilio Ballagas brought light to the once-marginalized African race and culture. It became a symbol of empowerment and individuality for Afro-Cubans within the established Western culture of the Americas.

This empowerment became a catalyst for the second stage to be characterized by Afro-Cuban artists making art that truly reflected what it meant to be Afro-Cuban. Beginning in the 1930s this stage depicted a more serious view of black culture like African religions and the struggles associated with slavery. The main protagonist during this stage of the movement was Nicolás Guillén.

=== Results of the movement ===
The lasting reputation of the Afrocubanismo movement was the establishment of a New World art form that used aesthetics from both European and African culture. Although the actual movement of Afrocubanismo faded by the early 1940s, Afro-Cuban culture continues to play a vital role in the identity of Cuba. It has been the Cuban Revolution that opened up a space for extended research of African ethnic roots in Cuba. The rhetoric of the Revolution incorporates black history and its contribution as an important stratum of Cuban identity. The Revolution has funded many projects that restore the work of Afro-Cubans in an effort to accommodate an African-driven identity within the new anti-racist Cuban society.

== Notable Afro-Cubans ==
=== Arts and entertainment ===
- Carlos Acosta – dancer
- Laz Alonso – actor
- Pastor Argudín Pedroso – painter
- Renny Arozarena – actor
- Gastón Baquero – poet
- Celia Cruz – singer
- Sammy Davis Jr – singer, dancer, actor
- Ángel Escobar – poet
- Lola Falana – actress, singer and dancer
- Rome Flynn – actor
- Sara Gómez – filmmaker
- Herizen F. Guardiola – actress
- Nicolás Guillén – poet
- Nestor Hernández – photographer
- Georgina Herrera – poet
- Faizon Love – actor
- Otmara Marrero – actress
- Mellow Man Ace – rapper
- Christina Milian – actress
- Nancy Morejón – poet
- Luis Moro – actor and filmmaker
- Teodoro Ramos Blanco – sculptor
- Gina Torres – actress
- Alexis Valdés – artist and comedian

=== Music ===
- Afro-Cuban All Stars
- Francisco Aguabella – percussionist
- Federico A. "Tata Güines" Soto Alejo – percussionist and bandleader
- X-Alfonso – singer
- Alfredo "Chocolate" Armenteros – trumpeter and bandleader; cousin of Benny Moré
- Guillermo Barreto – percussionist with Israel "Cachao" López
- Abelardo Barroso – singer and bandleader
- Mario Bauzá – musician and songwriter; brother-in-law of Machito
- Ignacio Berroa – percussionist
- Angela Bofill- singer
- Descemer Bueno – singer, composer and record producer
- Christina Milian – singer-songwriter, actress
- Cándido Camero – percussionist
- Humberto Cané – tres player and singer with Sonora Matancera; son of Valentín Cané
- "Changuito" – percussionist and former member of Los Van Van
- Félix Chappottín – trumpeter and bandleader; when Arsenio Rodríguez left Cuba never to return he handed over to him leadership of his group
- Julito Collazo – percussionist and singer
- Celia Cruz – singer
- Sammy Davis Jr. – singer
- Anga Díaz – percussionist and former member of Irakere
- Barbarito Diez – singer
- Addys D'Mercedes – singer
- Richard Egües – flute player, a member of Orquesta Aragón
- Ibrahim Ferrer – singer (Buena Vista Social Club)
- Juan de Marcos González – musical director of the Buena Vista Social Club
- Rubén González – pianist (Conjunto de Arsenio Rodríguez and Buena Vista Social Club)
- Graciela – singer; stepsister of Machito
- Francisco Raúl "Machito" Gutiérrez Grillo – singer, musician, and bandleader
- Marcelino "Rapindey" Guerra – singer and composer
- Orlando "Cascarita" Guerra – singer
- Amaury Gutiérrez – singer
- Óscar Hernández – songwriter; known for his lyrics "Ella y yo" and "La rosa roja;" cousin of Alberto Arredondo's mother
- Generoso "Tojo" Jiménez – trombonist
- Enrique Jorrín – violinist, composer, and inventor of the cha-cha-chá rhythm
- Pedro Knight – trumpeter with Sonora Matancera, second husband, manager after 1967, and eventual widower of Celia Cruz
- Xiomara Laugart – singer
- Calixto Leicea – trumpeter, songwriter, and arranger with Sonora Matancera
- Pío Leyva – singer-songwriter (Buena Vista Social Club)
- Olivia Longott – singer
- Israel "Cachao" López – bassist, composer, and bandleader, creator of the mambo and the first to record Cuban jam sessions (descargas)
- Orestes "Macho" López – pianist and songwriter; brother of Cachao
- Orlando "Cachaíto" López – bassist (Buena Vista Social Club); nephew of Cachao and Macho
- Antonio Machín – singer and bandleader
- Rita Marley – singer, humanitarian, and widow of Bob Marley
- Cheo Marquetti – singer and bandleader
- Luis Marquetti – composer; cousin of Cheo Marquetti
- Ray Martínez – American dance music icon
- Mellow Man Ace – rapper
- Celeste Mendoza – singer
- Pablo Milanés – singer
- Rita Montaner – singer, pianist and actress
- Benny Moré – singer and bandleader; cousin of Alfredo "Chocolate" Armenteros
- Fats Navarro – jazz musician
- Nayobe – singer
- Bola de Nieve – singer and pianist
- Faustino Oramas – singer, guitarist and composer
- Armando Peraza – percussionist
- Ignacio Piñeiro – musician, bandleader, and composer
- Omara Portuondo – singer (Buena Vista Social Club)
- Luciano "Chano" Pozo – Afro-Cuban/jazz percussionist, composer, and bandleader
- Dámaso Pérez Prado – "the king of mambo," composer, and the creator of the bachata rhythm, a variant of the guaracha
- Francisco "Compay Segundo" Repilado – singer (Dúo Los Compadres, Grupo de Compay Segundo, and Buena Vista Social Club), composer and bandleader
- Orlando "Puntilla" Ríos – percussionist, singer, and bandleader
- Arsenio Rodríguez – musician, bandleader, and songwriter
- Yotuel Romero – singer
- Lázaro Ros – singer
- Gonzalo Rubalcaba – jazz pianist
- Ramón "Mongo" Santamaría – musician, songwriter, and bandleader
- Ramón "Monguito el Único" Sardiñas Quián – singer
- Jon Secada – singer
- Sen Dog – rapper and member of Cypress Hill
- SpaceGhostPurrp – record producer and rapper, founder of Raider Klan
- Gustavo Tamayo – güiro player with the groundbreaking band of Israel "Cachao" López
- Bebo Valdés – pianist
- Carlos "Patato" Valdes – conga player and composer
- Chucho Valdés – pianist and leader of Irakere, son of Bebo Valdés
- Merceditas Valdés - singer
- Ezequiel "Lino" Frías Gómez - songwriter, arranger, and pianist with Sonora Matancera for 32 years
- Javier Vázquez – songwriter, arranger, and pianist with Sonora Matancera; son of Pablo "Bubú" Vázquez Gobín (co-founder of Sonora Matancera) and brother of Elpidio Vázquez, he succeeded Ezequiel "Lino" Frías Gómez on piano as a member of Sonora Matancera
- María Teresa Vera – guitarist, singer and composer
- Lupe Victoria "La Lupe" Yolí Raymond – singer
- Yusa – female bassist

=== Politics ===
- Salvador Valdés Mesa – First Vice President of Cuba, former trade union leader, Political Bureau of the Communist Party of Cuba
- Juan Almeida Bosque – politician and composer
- Víctor Dreke – Cuban revolutionary and second-in-command to Ernesto "Che" Guevara in the Congo
- Juan Gualberto Gómez – 1890s revolutionary leader, close collaborator of José Martí; served as a member of the committee of consultations that drafted and amended the Constitution of 1901 and as a Representative and Senator
- Mariana Grajales – part of the Cuban Independence War; Antonio Maceo's mother
- Evelio Grillo – author and community organizer
- Esteban Lazo Hernández – politician
- Antonio Maceo – 1890s revolutionary leader
- Jorge Luis García Pérez – human rights activist
- Rafael Serra – writer and political journalist
- Harry "Pombo" Villegas – Cuban Communist guerilla
- Enrique Tarrio – far-right activist and leader of the far right Proud Boys movement

=== Science ===
- Arnaldo Tamayo Méndez – cosmonaut; first Latin American and first person of African descent in outer space

=== Sports ===
- Mijaín López – Olympic wrestler; Five-time gold medalist
- Jorge Alayo – Volleyball player
- Gilbert Arenas – NBA
- Hipolito Arenas – baseball player
- Javier Arenas – NFL
- Randy Arozarena – MLB
- Yoel Romero – Olympic wrestler and mixed martial artist
- Héctor Lombard – Olympic Judoka and mixed martial artist
- Alexis Vila – Olympic wrestler
- Bert Campaneris – MLB, cousin of José Cardenal
- José Cardenal – MLB
- Joel Casamayor – boxer; WBC Lightweight Champion
- Aroldis Chapman – MLB
- José Contreras – MLB
- Martín Dihigo – Negro leagues, Baseball Hall of Fame
- Yuniel Dorticos – Boxer:two-time cruiserweight world champion, having held the WBA title from 2017 to 2018 and the IBF title from 2019 to September 2020.
- Juan Carlos Gómez – boxer; former WBC Cruiserweight Champion
- Liván Hernández – MLB, half-brother of El Duque
- Orlando "El Duque" Hernández – MLB
- Yoan Pablo Hernández – professional boxer; he held the unified IBF and Ring magazine cruiserweight titles between 2011 and 2015, as well as the WBA interim cruiserweight title in 2011.
- Kid Chocolate – boxer; former World Featherweight and Junior Lightweight Champion
- Nolsen Díaz – Volleyball player
- Orestes Kindelán – most prolific home run hitter in the history of amateur Cuban baseball
- Minnie Miñoso – MLB
- José Nápoles – boxer; former World Welterweight Champion; also known as "Mantequilla" Nápoles
- Chris Olave – NFL
- Sergio Oliva – only bodybuilder to have ever beaten Arnold Schwarzenegger in a Mr. Olympia competition
- Tony Oliva – MLB, three time batting champion
- Luis Ortiz – professional heavyweight boxer and former WBA Heavyweight Champion
- Brayan Peña – MLB
- Tony Pérez – MLB Hall of Fame
- Anthony Echemendia – amateur wrestler
- Juan Pizarro – MLB
- Yasiel Puig – MLB
- Ana Fidelia Quirot – athlete
- Alexei Ramírez – MLB
- Sugar Ramos – boxer; former WBA Featherweight Champion
- Alexis Rubalcaba – amateur boxer
- Félix Savón – amateur boxer
- Javier Sotomayor – world record holder in high jump
- Teófilo Stevenson – amateur boxer
- Luis Tiant – MLB
- Regla Torres – volleyball player
- Cristóbal Torriente – Negro leagues, Baseball Hall of Fame
- Lola Vice – Professional wrestler and former MMA fighter
- César Munder
- Yénier Márquez
- Katheryn Rodríguez
- Lester Moré
- Odisnel Cooper
- Yordany Álvarez
- Alexis Copello
- Aricheell Hernández
- Pedro Pichardo
- Havana Solaun
- Julio César La Cruz
- Maikel Reyes
- Marcel Hernández

== See also ==
- Afro-Latin Americans – Latin America
- Black Latino Americans – United States
- Cabildo (Cuba)
- Emancipados
- Haitian Cuban
- MPLA
- Angolan Civil War
- Afro-Cuban jazz
- Racism in Cuba
- Slavery in Cuba
