= Haitian Vodou in Cuba =

Religion indigenous to Cuba

The religion of Haitian Vodou (Spanish: Vodú Haitiano) has been present in Cuba since at least the 18th century. It was transmitted to the island by Haitian migrants, the numbers of whom grew rapidly in the early 20th century, and is principally practised by their descendants. It is distributed primarily in eastern parts of the island, especially in Oriente. In Cuba, some practitioners of Haitian Vodou have also become involved in the related Afro-Cuban religion of Santería.

== History ==
=== Background ===
Around 35 miles separate the republic of Haiti from the eastern end of Cuba. From the 16th century onward, West European colonists transported large numbers of enslaved West and Central Africans to the two Caribbean colonies, where the African traditional religions they brought with them developed into new African diasporic traditions. In Haiti, this took the form of Haitian Vodou. This religion was primarily influenced by the traditional religions of the Fon and Bakongo peoples, but also absorbed the iconography of European-derived traditions such as Roman Catholicism and Freemasonry. These elements combined into the form of Vodou around the mid-18th century.

The transportation of enslaved West and Central Africans to Cuba similarly resulted in the formation of various Afro-Cuban traditions. The best known of these was Santería, formed largely from Yoruba religion as it interacted with Roman Catholicism and Spiritism. Also present was Palo, informed predominantly by Kongo religion but which also absorbed Roman Catholic and Spiritist ideas. A third Afro-Cuban tradition is Abakuá, which has its origins among the secret male societies practiced among the Efik-Ibibio. Before the end of the 18th century, Ewé Fon/Adja people had also arrived in Cuba, where their traditions produced Arará, a religion found predominantly in western and central parts of the island. Although its origins are not Yoruba, Arará is sometimes considered a branch of Santería rather than a separate system.

=== Arrival in Cuba ===
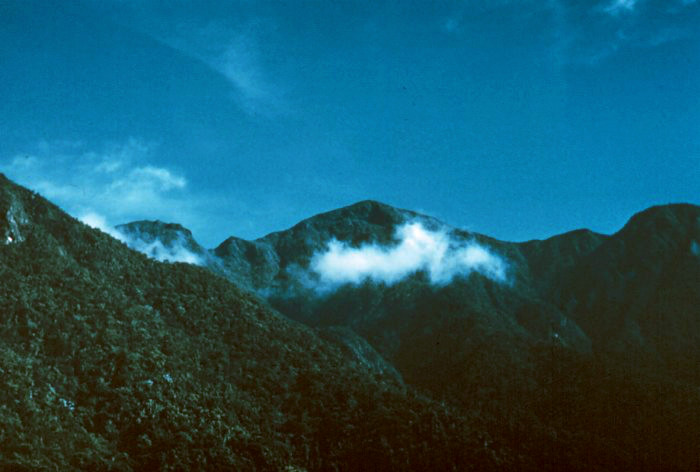
From the 18th century, Haitian migrants began settling around Cuba's Sierra Maestra (pictured)

Vodou was brought to Cuba by Haitian migrants. During the 18th century, small numbers of enslaved Africans escaped the French colony of Saint-Domingue—which later became Haiti—and fled to eastern Cuba, where they settled in forested areas around the Sierra Maestra. Later, amid the turmoil of the Haitian Revolution that overthrew French colonial rule, larger numbers of Haitians migrated to Cuba.

The social similarities between the two plantation colonies would have facilitated the adjustment of these Haitian migrants. They would have found that the Cuban cabildos were similar to the Haitian societés, both forming social groups for people of African descent. Haitian migrants established their own such groups in eastern Cuba, referred to as Tumba Francesas or Tajones, and it was within these groups that they could retain their own distinctive songs, dances, and drumming styles.

Haitian migrants would have recognised various aspects of Cuban religion from their earlier experiences, including the Roman Catholicism officially dominant on both islands as well as surviving influences from Kongo religion. The use of spirits contained in bottles and other vessels, for example, could be found in both Haitian Vodou and Cuban Palo, reflecting a common origin in Kongo practices.

The Haitian population of eastern Cuba would be continually replenished over the course of the 19th century and beyond, as Haitian migrants seeking better economic opportunities migrated there. This grew dramatically in the early 20th century; between 1912 and 1916, annual migration of Haitians to Cuba rose from 8,784 to 79,274. Most of these migrants brought with them a familiarity, if not the actual practice, of Haitian Vodou.

== Belief, practice, and organization ==
As recorded in the early 21st century, Haitian Vodou as practiced in Oriente contained various elements familiar from Haiti, including the veneration of lwa spirits who can be divided into various nanchon (nations), namely the Rada and the Petwo. The scholar of religion Jualynne E. Dodson noted that the veneration of the lwa Damballah was "absolutely fundamental" to Vodou in Oriente. Dodson also found that devotion to a family of warrior lwa was also "predominant" in the region. The historian Jeffrey E. Anderson stated that the Guedé spirit Jan Zombi is given much greater recognition by Cuban Vodouists than by their counterparts in Haiti.

In Oriente, Vodou is organized along a kin-based, family structure. Dodson for example found that every practitioner they encountered had a "genealogical spiritual relationship to the group leader". Isolated rural spaces in the Sierra Maestra were often favored for the practice of Vodou rituals, but places were also active in the cities of Santiago, Guantánamo, and Las Tunas. Dodson believed that engaging in the construction of Vodou sacred spaces and rituals helped "to maintain consciousness of a distinct Haitian cultural identity" in Cuba. They thus considered these to be a "memory device", even for those of Haitian ancestry who were born and raised on Cuba.

Some individuals have practised both Haitian Vodou and also Santería.

== Distribution ==
In Cuba, Haitian Vodou is primarily practised in eastern parts of the island, especially in the mountain communities of the Sierra Maestra. Although associated largely with Oriente province, it is also found outside this area, for instance among communities of Haitian descent in Ciego de Avila.

== See also ==
- Candomblé Jejé
- Dominican Vudu
- Louisiana Voodoo
