= Juan Boria =

Puerto Rican poet reciter

Juan Boria Romero
- Born: February 17, 1905; Dorado, Puerto Rico
- Died: May 29, 1995 (aged 90); Río Piedras, Puerto Rico
- Occupations: Poet reciter, industrial arts educator, carpenter & English teacher
- Spouses: Emerita Rodriguez (2nd partner, only wife) (m. 1941)
- Children: Cruz Boria, Zayda Boria, Norma Boria (3)
- Writing career
- Pen name: Negro Verse Pharaoh
- Genre: Poetry (Declamation/Performance poetry)
- Subjects: Negrista/Negroid Poems, Afro-Caribbean
- Movement: Negrista poetry movement

Juan Boria Romero (February 17, 1905 – May 29, 1995) also known as the Negro Verse Pharaoh, was a Puerto Rican poet reciter of Afro-Caribbean poetry.

== Family background and early years ==
Juan Boria Romero was born on February 17, 1905, in Dorado, Puerto Rico, to Juan Boria Osorio and Anselma Romero Semprit. He was the family’s firstborn child and grew up in a household of skilled tradespeople.

His father, Juan Boria Osorio, worked as a mechanical engineer specializing in the maintenance and operation of sugar mills (*centrales azucareras*) along Puerto Rico’s northern coast. His family worked in agriculture, construction, and other manual trades in Dorado, Toa Baja, and Vega Baja.

His mother, Anselma Romero Semprit, came from a family of craftsmen and builders in Dorado.

Juan Boria Romero was born on February 17, 1905, in Dorado, Puerto Rico, to Juan Boria Osorio and Anselma Romero Semprit. He was the family’s firstborn child and grew up in a household defined by skilled manual trades and mixed ethnic roots.

Both parents lived to advanced ages—his father to 108 and his mother to 99. Boria was affectionately nicknamed “Juanitillo” by his father and regularly helped him with craftsmanship tasks. He completed elementary school in Dorado. Because no secondary school existed locally, he continued his studies in neighboring Toa Baja, supporting himself by working weekends as a carpenter and mason. He graduated from Central High School in Santurce in 1923.

In 1935, he had his eldest daughter, Cruz Amanda Boria, with his first partner, but was not legally married to her. In 1941 he married Emérita Rodríguez, a native of San Germán. The couple settled in Cupey, Río Piedras, and had two daughters: Norma Boria, who pursued a career in accounting, and Zayda Boria, who entered the medical field of neurology.

== Education and entry into teaching ==
After high school the family moved to Cataño. Boria traveled daily to the University of Puerto Rico in Río Piedras, where he earned a bachelor’s degree as a teacher of industrial arts, drawing, and carpentry. He worked in commercial workshops for several years before joining the public school system in 1937. His first assignment was a rural school in San Germán; he was later transferred to the Segunda Unidad of Campo Rico in Canóvanas.

== Artistic discovery and professional beginnings (1938–1941) ==
In 1938, at a school cultural evening in Canóvanas, Boria heard colleague Pablito Rivera recite the negrista poem “La negra curandera.” Deeply moved, he memorized the piece and began performing it at informal gatherings. Friends urged him to audition for the Sunday radio program Industrias nativas on WKAQ. The broadcast was heard by poet Fortunato Vizcarrondo, who visited Boria at home, identified himself as the author, and gave him manuscripts of several of his best-known works, including “Y tu abuela, ¿a ónde está?”, “Baile cangrejero”, “El negro borracho”, and “Loíza Aldea.” The meeting began a lifelong creative partnership.

In 1941, while performing in Medianía Alta, Loíza, Boria was discovered by comedian Ramón Rivero (“Diplo”) and director José Luis Torregrosa of the theater company La farándula bohemia. They brought him into the troupe, marking his professional stage debut.

== Rise to prominence and international career (1940s–1950s) ==
In 1943 Rivero formally conferred on him the title “El Faraón del Verso Negro.” Boria toured Puerto Rico’s major theaters as both a dramatic declamador and a comic actor. In 1944 the government sent him with the company to entertain American troops stationed in the Panama Canal Zone. From 1947 he appeared regularly on the popular radio comedy El tremendo hotel.

In 1950, with endorsements from Rivero and poet Luis Palés Matos, he traveled to Havana, Cuba. Booked for two weeks, the positive reception extended his stay to two months; during this period he collaborated with Cuban national poet Nicolás Guillén. He subsequently performed in the Dominican Republic, Colombia, Venezuela, Spain, Portugal, and New York City.

== Television, cinema, and later recognition ==
Boria made his television debut in 1954 on the first televised version of Rafael Quiñones Vidal’s Tribuna del arte (Telemundo Canal 2). He became a regular comic performer on variety shows such as La taberna India. In 1964 he appeared in the Mexican-Puerto Rican film Mientras Puerto Rico duerme, directed by Julián Soler, and also starred in educational short films produced by the Division of Community Education (DIVEDCO).

From 1965 he presented open-air recitals and cultural lectures under the sponsorship of the Institute of Puerto Rican Culture. In 1979 he took part in three “mano a mano” recitals with Cuban master Luis Carbonell during the Cultural Olympics held in conjunction with the 9th Pan American Games in San Juan. Over his lifetime he received more than 200 civic and artistic honors. In 1984 the municipality of Dorado renovated the historic Juana de Arco theater and renamed it the Teatro Juan Boria in his honor.

== Retirement and death ==
After 37 years of teaching, Boria retired from public education in 1974. He continued working from home as a bookbinder and restorer until his death on May 29, 1995, in Río Piedras.

== Influences ==
Although he identified with the works of Vizcarrondo, Palés Matos and Nicolás Guillén, his repertoire included poems from:

- Emilio Ballagas
- Félix B. Caignet
- Gonzalo Castañón
- Marcelino Arozamena
- Lorenzo Coballés
- Alfonso Camín
- Pablo Motito
- Gilberto Hernández Santana
- Enrique Montijo
- María Teresa Vallés
- Luis Manuel Ruiz
- Rubén Suro

== Discography ==
- ¡Qué negrota! (Mar-Vela, MVLP-107)

== See also ==
- List of Puerto Ricans
- List of Puerto Ricans of African descent
