= Oscar Hernandez =

Oscar Hernandez may refer to:

== Arts and Entertainment ==
- Oscar Hernández Falcón (1891–1967), Cuban guitarist and composer of La Rosa Roja
- Oscar Hernández (musician) (born 1954), Puerto Rican musician
- Óscar Hernández (actor) (born 1947), Chilean actor

== Politics ==
- Oscar Hernandez (politician), former mayor of Bell, California
- Oscar Ramiro Ortega-Hernandez, suspect in shooting at the White House in 2011

== Sportspeople ==
- Óscar Hernández (footballer, born 1950), Honduran football forward
- Óscar Hernández (footballer, born 1976), Spanish football manager and former midfielder
- Óscar Hernández (tennis) (born 1978), Spanish tennis player
- Oscar Hernández (baseball) (born 1993), Venezuelan baseball player
- Óscar Hernández (footballer, born 1993), Chilean football midfielder

== See also ==
- Oscar Isaac (born 1969), actor and musician, full name Oscar Isaac Hernandez
- Teoscar Hernández (born 1992), Dominican baseball player
