= Maraca =

Percussion instrument

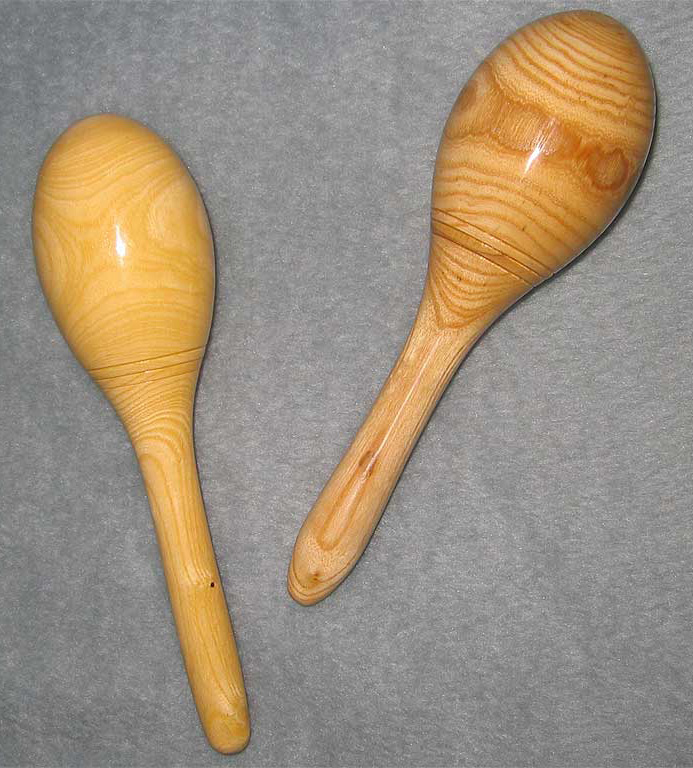

Percussion instrument
- Classification: Percussion
- Hornbostel–Sachs classification: 112.1 (Shaken idiophones or rattles)

Related instruments
- Shekere

Musicians
- Machito, Monguito

Builders
- LP Percussion

Sound sample

A maraca (/məˈrækə/ mə-RAK-ə, US also /məˈrɑːkə/ mə-RAH-kə, Brazilian Portuguese: [maˈɾakɐ]), sometimes called shaker or chac-chac, is a rattle which appears in many genres of Caribbean and Latin music, as well as rock music on occasion. It is shaken by a handle and usually played as part of a pair. A maraca player in the Spanish language is called a maraquero.

== Etymology ==
The term maraca is believed to originate from the Guarani word mbaraka. Other authors, for their part, believe that it is a corruption of the Arabic-origin word mitraqah, used in African countries with a dual meaning of bell and hammer. However, some authors have questioned the Arabic origin, since mitraqah apparently derives from the Spanish word matraca.

The instrument is known by various names across Latin America and the Caribbean, including maracá (Brazil), chac-chac or shak-shak (Eastern Caribbean), and higuera (Puerto Rico, referencing the calabash tree). In Brazil, numerous regional variants exist, such as adjá, canzá, ganzá, and xeque.

== History ==
The maraca is of pre-Columbian origin and is believed to have been used by the indigenous people of parts of South America and the Caribbean for ceremonial and communicative purposes. Ethnographic accounts attribute its invention to groups such as the Arawak and Taíno peoples. In the 18th century, Jesuit missionary José Gumilla noted the use of marakas among the Arawak-speaking people in the Orinoco basin. Maracas were rattles of divination, an oracle of the Brazilian Tupinamba people, found also with other Indigenous ethnic groups, such as the Guarani, Orinoco in Florida, United States.

Rattles made from Lagenaria gourds are being shaken by the natural grip, while the round Crescentia calabash fruits are fitted to a handle. Modern maraca balls are made of leather, wood or plastic with a wooden stick inserted through a hole in the shell to serve as a handle. Human hair is sometimes fastened on the top, and a slit is cut in it to represent a mouth, through which their shamans (payes) made it utter its responses. A few pebbles are inserted to make it rattle and it is crowned with the red feathers of guarás (scarlet ibises). It was used at their dances and to heal the sick. The design may vary by region; for example, in Puerto Rico, maracas are fashioned from the higuera fruit, while in other areas they are made of tin, wood, leather, or synthetic materials. The contents and materials affect the instrument's timbre and volume. Andean curanderos (healers) use maracas in their healing rites.

== Performance ==
The maraca produces sound through the shaking motion, which causes the internal elements to strike against the container's interior. It plays a primarily rhythmic role, accentuating the beat in various musical styles. In Latin American popular music, the maraca is particularly associated with genres such as son cubano, guaracha, danzón, salsa, bomba, mambo, samba, cumbia, and calypso. In some styles, one maraca may be used (as in bomba), while others require a pair played simultaneously.. The maraca exhibited a frequency response between 3000 Hz and 10,000 Hz, as measured using a microphone connected to an oscilloscope and analyzed through "SCOPE" software.

In many indigenous and Afro-Brazilian spiritual traditions, the maraca may also serve as a sacred function. Among the Tabajara people of Brazil, the maraca is considered a "sacred object" used during the Toré ritual. It represents a conduit between the human and spiritual realms, facilitating communication with ancestral spirits known as Encantados. Decorative elements such as feathers and symbolic paintings enhance its spiritual potency.

In pajelança (an Afro-Indigenous healing practice in northern Brazil), the maraca is used to summon spiritual entities during therapeutic and trance rituals. The instrument marks the rhythm of sacred songs (doutrinas), and its sound is believed to activate healing forces. Pajés (healers) often differentiate between the traditional gourd maraca and metallic variants (xeque) used in syncretic rituals.

== Gallery ==
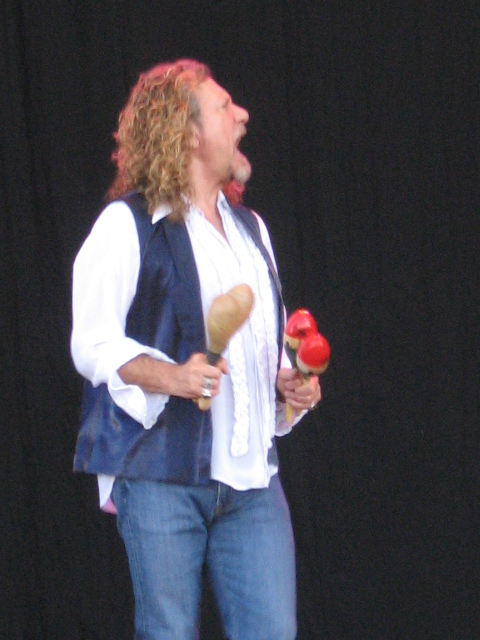
Robert Plant playing two pairs of maracas

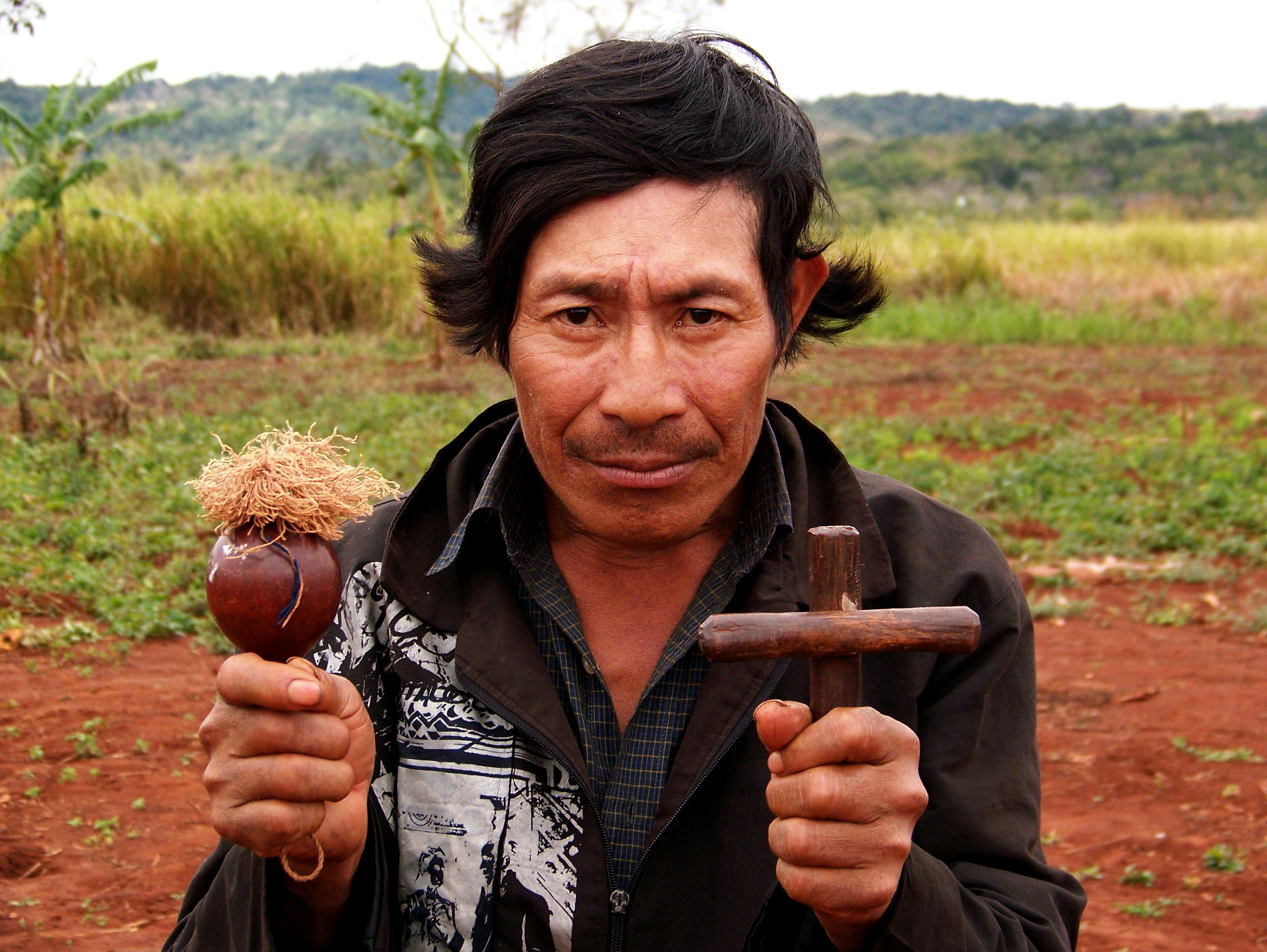
Guarani shaman holding cross and maraca

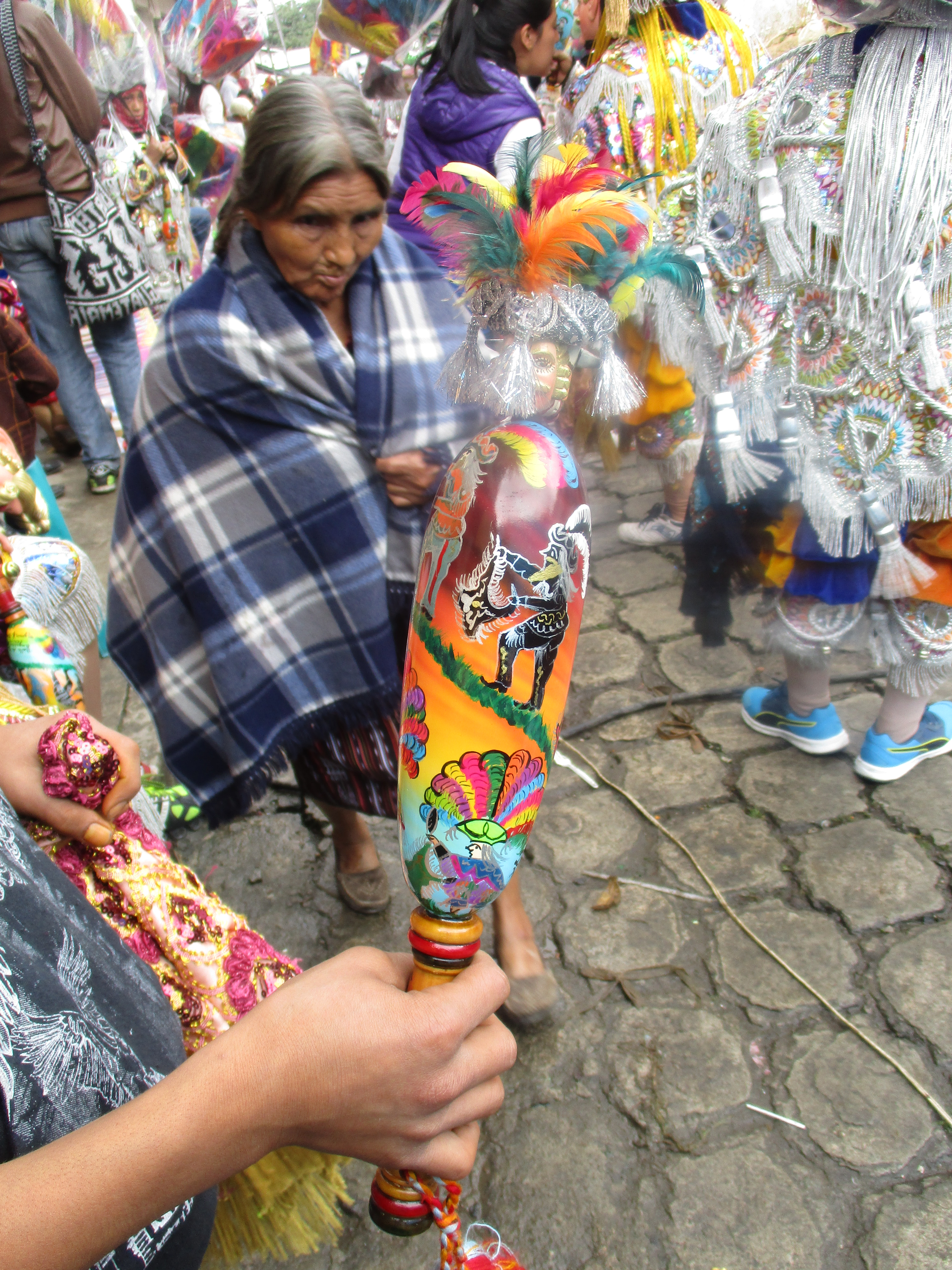
A maraca used by the knights of Toritos de Chichicastenango, danced for the feast of Saint Thomas, around 21 December. Each maraca is unique and made specially for each year
