= Haitian Vodoun Culture Language =

Collection of loanwords

- Langay, Langaj
- Native to: Haiti
- Native speakers: None (liturgical language)
- Language family: None

Language codes
- ISO 639-3: hvc
- Glottolog: hait1241

Haitian Vodoun Culture Language (known as Langay and Langaj; literally "language") is a specialized vocabulary used in Haiti for religion, song, and dance purposes. It appears to not be an actual language, but rather an assortment of words, songs, and incantations – some secret – from various languages once used in Haitian Vodoun ceremonies.

== See also ==
- Haitian Vodou
- Lucumí language
