= Lucumí language =

Ritual lexicon of Cuban Orisa devotees

Lucumí
- Native to: Used in Spanish Caribbean and the Diaspora
- Ethnicity: Black Cubans
- Native speakers: None (liturgical language)
- Language family: Niger–Congo?: Atlantic–Congo; Volta–Congo; Benue–Congo; Defoid; Yoruboid; Edekiri; Lucumi-Yoruba; Lucumí

Official status
- Recognised minority language in: Cuba

Language codes
- ISO 639-3: luq
- Glottolog: lucu1238

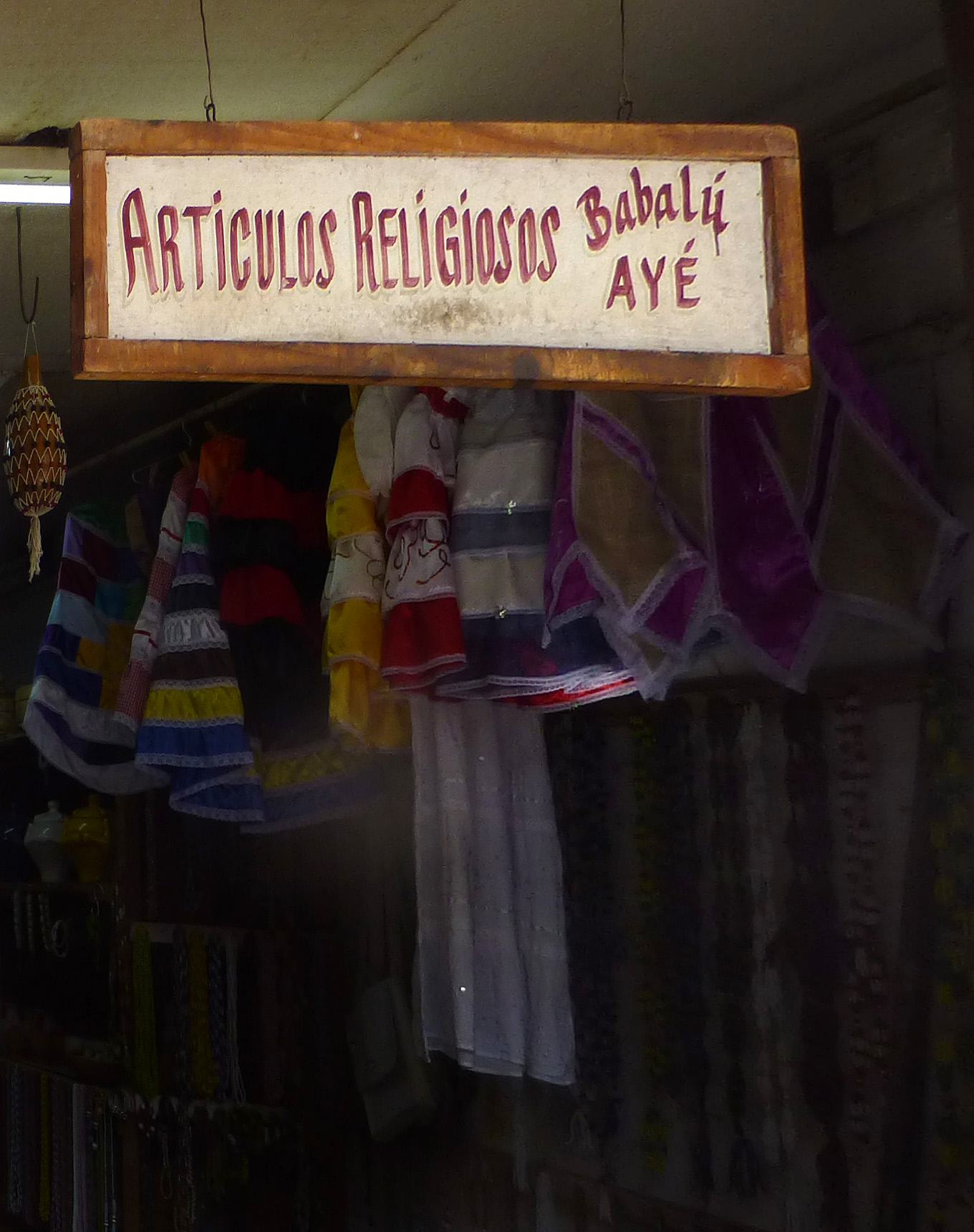
Store sign in La Havana, Cuba with the Lucumí name of the orisha Babalú-Ayé.

Lucumí is a ritual lexicon that consists of a vocabulary of words and short phrases derived from Yoruba and used for ritual purposes in Cuba and the Cuban diaspora. It originated from Yoruba people enslaved in Spanish America, towards the end of the Atlantic Slave Trade. It is used as the liturgical language of Santería in the Spanish Caribbean and other communities that practice the religion of Santería, also called Lucumí, Orisa/Orisha/Oricha or Regla de Ocha.

The Yorùbá language has not been a vernacular among Yoruba descendants in the Americas since the time of the trans-Atlantic slave trade; devotees of the Orisa religion as it formed in the Spanish Caribbean use a liturgical language that developed from its remains. Lucumí has also been influenced by the phonetics and pronunciation of Spanish. The essential and non-negotiable tonal aspect of Yorùbá has also been lost in the Lucumí lexicon of Cuban Orisa tradition. Lucumí vocabulary is often combined with Spanish to be able to fill in linguistic gaps in a type of creolization, akin to an older Spanish-bases creole known as "Español bozal" supposedly spoken by first generation africans in Cuba. Scholars have found some minimal influence from Bantu languages and Fongbe, some of which were spoken by other enslaved Africans who lived in close proximity to Yorùbá speakers in the Americas. This mixture of Spanish, Yorùbá-derived words that went through language attrition, and remnants of Bantu-derived words and Fongbe derived words is also what the oricha of Afro-Cuban Regla de Ocha religion (known alternately as Santería or Lucumí religion or simply "La Ocha") use to communicate messages to their devotees during trance-possession that occurs during drumming ceremonies.

== See also ==
- Diaspora language
- Afro-Cubans
- Santería
- Habla Congo, a similar liturgical language based on Kongo
- Haitian Vodoun Culture Language
