= Cape Verdeans in Cuba =

Cubans whose ancestry originated in Cape Verde

Cape Verdean Cuban are Cuban citizens or residents whose ancestry originated in Cape Verde.

Cape Verde and Cuba have had a long history. The first people from Cape Verde to Cuba came involuntarily. In 1526, the "first known shipment of slaves intended for sale in Cuba carries 145 Africans from Cabo Verde to the island." More slaves from Cape Verde would follow. This would include the ancestor of Roel Caboverde Llacer, a famous Cuban artist.

Cuba and Cape Verde established diplomatic relations in September 1975, a few months after Cape Verdean independence. "Since 1976, over 1,000 Cuban collaborators, mostly physicians and health technicians, have been working in that African nation, and nearly 1,000 Cape Verdean scholarship students have completed pre-university and university studies in Cuba." As of 2007, however, there are no estimates for the number of people of Cape Verdean descent living in Cuba.

In 2005, Germano Almeida's Two Brothers was translated into Spanish and included in an Arts and Literature anthology. In the same year, Fidel Castro presented Pedro Rodrigues Pires with the Jose Marti Order, Cuba's highest decoration.
