= ¿Y Tu Abuela Donde Esta? =

Poem by Puerto Rican poet Fortunato Vizcarrondo

¿Y Tu Abuela Donde Esta? (¿Y tu agüela, aonde ejtá? in the Puerto Rican dialect) is a poem by Puerto Rican poet Fortunato Vizcarrondo (1899 – 1977), which has been recorded both as songs and as poetry by many Latin American artists, most notably the puerto rican artist Juan Boria. The phrase, translated from the Spanish means "and where is your grandmother?", but the poem is recited in a Puerto Rican dialect as if spoken by an Afro-Puerto Rican.

== The Poem ==
Ayé me dijite negro
Y hoy te boy a contejtá:
Mi mai se sienta en la sala.
¿Y tu agüela, aonde ejtá?

Yo tengo el pelo'e caíyo:
El tuyo ej seda namá;
Tu pai lo tiene bien lasio,
¿Y tu agüela, aonde ejtá?

Tu coló te salió blanco
Y la mejiya rosá;
Loj lábioj loj tiénej finoj . . .
¿Y tu agüela, aonde ejtá?

¿Disej que mi bemba ej grande
Y mi pasa colorá?
Pero dijme, por la vijne,
¿Y tu agüela, aonde ejtá?

Como tu nena ej blanquita
La sacaj mucho a pasiá . . .
Y yo con ganae gritate
¿Y tu agüela, aonde ejtá?

A ti te gujta el fojtrote,
Y a mi brujca maniguá.
Tú te laj tiraj de blanco
¿Y tu agüela, aonde ejtá?

Erej blanquito enchapao
Que dentraj en sosiedá,
Temiendo que se conojca
La mamá de tu mamá.

Aquí el que no tiene dinga
Tiene mandinga . . ¡ja, ja!
Por eso yo te pregunto
¿Y tu agüela, aonde ejtá?

Ayé me dijite negro
Queriéndome abochoná.
Mi agüela sale a la sala,
Y la tuya oculta ajtá.

La pobre se ejtá muriendo
Al belse tan maltratá.
Que hajta tu perro le ladra
Si acaso a la sala bá.

¡Y bien que yo la conojco!
Se ñama Siña Tatá . . .
Tu la ejconde en la cosina,

Po'que ej prieta de a beldá.

== Meaning ==
The poem tells the story of a black Puerto Rican who "answers" a white-skinned Puerto Rican after the latter calls the Afro-Puerto Rican "black" and "big lipped." In his answer, the black man describes both his own African attributes while also describing the European attributes of the white Puerto Rican as well as that person's light-skinned daughter. All the while the black man keeps asking in nearly every stanza, "... and where is your grandmother?"

The meaning of the question is made clear as the poem develops; the black man notes that his own grandmother "sits in the living room, but yours is kept hidden." The reason for that is revealed in the last stanza, when the black man tells the world that the "white" Puerto Rican keeps the grandmother hidden in the kitchen because she is so dark-skinned; we also learn that her name is Siña Tatá.

The poem is widely interpreted as an elegant way to identify the racism faced by Puerto Ricans of clear African ancestry from their own people of Caucasian features, but who may have an African ancestor themselves.
