= Monguito =

Monguito El Único
- Also known as: Ramón Sardiñas
- Born: Ramón Quián; Manguito, Matanzas, Cuba
- Died: May 26, 2006 New York City, US
- Genres: Son cubano, salsa
- Occupation(s): Musician, bandleader, producer, composer
- Instrument(s): Vocals, maracas
- Labels: Fania Oro Disco, SAR, Sacodis.

Ramón Quián (died May 26, 2006), better known as Monguito "El Único", was a Cuban vocalist, bandleader, producer and composer. An Afro-Cuban sonero, he had a simple improvising style.

== Career ==
Monguito el Único was a member of Johnny Pacheco's conjunto in the mid-1960s, alternating lead vocals with the Puerto Rican singer Chivirico Dávila.

Much like Ismael Rivera, Monguito el Único embodies an earthy, pragmatic aesthetic in the tradition of the son montuno, forged in the streets of Cuba.

He was also uncle to Laurita Rodriguez, a prominent defense attorney in New York City.

== Discography ==
- Pacheco te invita a bailar (with Johnny Pacheco) (1965)
- Bajándote (with Orchestra Harlow) (1966)
- Viva África (with Johnny Pacheco) (1966)
- Latin Mann (with Herbie Mann) (1966)
- Pacheco Presents Monguito (with Johnny Pacheco) (1967)
- Fania All-Stars - Live at the Red Garter - Vol. 1 (1968)
- El Único (1968)
- De Todo Un Poco (1969)
- Escúchame (Listen To Me) (1971)
- Yo No Soy Mentiroso (1979)
- Sabrosura (with Johnny Pacheco) (1980)
- La Crema (with Johnny Pacheco) (1980)
- In Curaçao (1980)
- Monguito El Internacional (1982)
- Monguito "Miren Que Suerte" SAR (1982)
- "Soy La Meta" "Caiman" (1994)
- "Sazonando" Monguito SAR (1985)
