= Rafael Serra =

Cuban intellectual (1858–1909)

José Rafael Simón Agapito Serra y Montalvo
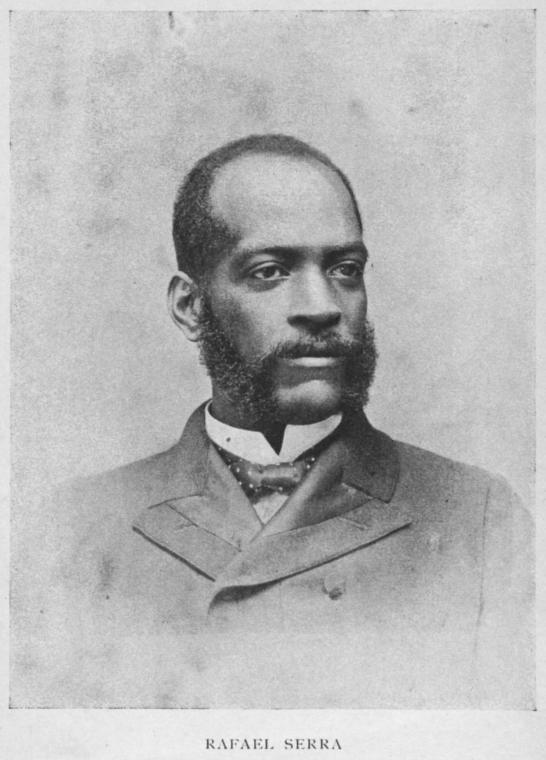
- Born: March 24, 1858
- Died: October 24, 1909 (aged 51)
- Occupations: Writer, political journalist
- Spouse: Gertrudis Heredia
- Children: Consuelo Serra Heredia

José Rafael Simón Agapito Serra y Montalvo (March 24, 1858 – October 24, 1909) was an Afro-Cuban intellectual who played a large role in supporting the Cuban War of Independence. He worked as a writer and editor for Spanish-language newspapers in the United States. He advocated for working class Cubans of color. He was a key figure in New York City, contributing to a larger movement for Cuban Independence happening across the United States.

== Early life ==
Rafael Serra was born José Rafael Simón Agapito in the Monserrate neighborhood of Havana, Cuba on March 24, 1858. His surnames were Serra and Montalvo. He was born while slavery continued in Cuba. At age thirteen, his father died and he was forced to abandon his studies to help support his family. He found employment as a cigar factory apprentice. He later married María Gertrudis Heredia in 1878, and they had four children, including a daughter, Consuelo.

A short time later he moved from his hometown to Matanzas. At the age of 21 he established the Harmony Society for Instruction and Leisure, where he taught classes to children in the day and day laborers at night. The school offered, among other activities, free classes to 48 black and white children.

== Career ==
Rafael Serra played a prominent role in raising awareness and support for the efforts that led to the Cuban War of Independence during the 1880s and 1890s. Working alongside José Martí and other Cuban Americans in New York City, Serra was a political journalist who wrote for and edited several newspapers in the United States, including La Doctrina de Martí.

On August 5, 1883, an organization called El Club de los Independientes was formed by several Afro-Cuban migrants. Rafael Serra served on the Board of Trustees along with pro-independence and pro-labor revolutionaries Justo Lanigua, Martín Morúa Delgado, and Vicente Diascosmas. They organized themselves so that they could aid in the efforts toward Cuban Independence, hoping to use their experiences to inform Cubans about the harsh realities of life in the United States.

Racial inequality persisted while Serra lived in New York City. Afro-Cubans experienced harsh discrimination and segregation and were often left to work difficult, labor-intensive jobs at restaurants and cigar factories. Serra once wrote that, "through no fault of their own, Afro Cubans remained the poorest and most uneducated element of Cuban society." Devoted to promoting the interests of black Cubans, Serra emphasized the importance of education founding educational institutions such as La Liga de Instruccion.

== Life Work ==
=== La Liga de Instruccion ===
La Liga de Instruccion was an educational institution founded by Rafael Serra, designed to "elevate the character of men of color born in Cuba and Puerto Rico". La Liga held its first official meeting on January 22, 1890. Black Cuban and Puerto Rican men living in New York City came to study, where they learned how to fight for social justice, equality and labor rights. Serra's goal was to provide black Cuban men with the proper tools to defend themselves.

=== La Doctrina de Marti ===
Serra founded La Doctrina de Marti, inspired by his friend José Martí. The first volume issue was published on July 25, 1896. The newspaper circulated throughout Mexico, Central America, and the Caribbean. It was noted as "an important newspaper for all Cubans" by José A Malberti, the president of El Club Político Cubano Bartolome Masó, based in Mexico. The paper had a central focus on educating the working class on political and cultural justice issues.

== Selected works ==
- 1886 – Ideas y Pensamientos
- 1886 – Album Poético, Político y Literario
- 1892 – Ensayos Políticos
- 1895 – La Doctrina de Martí: La República con Todo y Para Todos
- 1895 – La Verdad

== See also ==
- Cuban War of Independence
- José Martí
- List of Spanish-language newspapers published in the United States
