= Sacred language =

Language that is cultivated for religious reasons

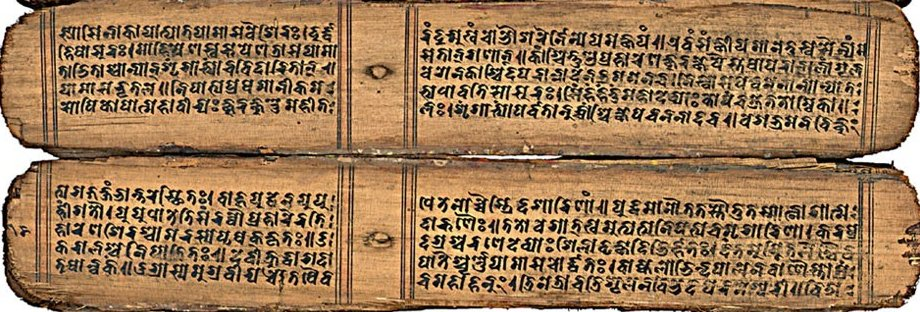
The oldest surviving manuscript in the sacred Sanskrit language: Devi Māhātmya, on palm-leaf, in the Nepalese Bhujimol script 11th century.

A sacred language, liturgical language, lingua sacra, or holy language is a language that is cultivated and used primarily for religious reasons (like church service) by people who speak another, primary language in their daily lives.

Some religions, or parts of them, regard the language of their sacred texts as in itself sacred. These include Ecclesiastical Latin in Roman Catholicism, Hebrew in Judaism, Arabic in Islam, Avestan in Zoroastrianism, Sanskrit and Tamil in Hinduism, and Meitei in Sanamahism. By contrast Buddhism and Christian denominations outside of Catholicism do not generally regard their sacred languages as sacred in themselves.

== Concept ==
A sacred language is often the language which was spoken and written in the society in which a religion's sacred texts were first set down; these texts thereafter become fixed and holy, remaining frozen and immune to later linguistic developments. (An exception to this is Lucumí, a ritual lexicon of the Cuban strain of the Santería religion, with no standardized form.)

Once a language becomes associated with religious worship, its believers may ascribe virtues to the language of worship that they would not give to their native tongues. In the case of sacred texts, there is a fear of losing authenticity and accuracy by a translation or re-translation, and difficulties in achieving acceptance for a new version of a text. A sacred language is typically vested with a solemnity and dignity that the vernacular lacks. Consequently, the training of clergy in the use of a sacred language becomes an important cultural investment, and their use of the tongue is perceived to give them access to a body of knowledge that untrained laypeople cannot (or should not) access.

Because sacred languages are ascribed with virtues that the vernacular is not seen to have, these typically preserve characteristics lost in the course of language development. In some cases, the sacred language is a dead language, while in others, it may simply reflect archaic forms of a living language. For instance, 17th-century elements of the English language remain current in Protestant Christian worship through the use of the King James Bible from 1611, or older versions of the Anglican Book of Common Prayer. In more extreme cases, the language has changed so much from the language of the sacred texts that the liturgy is barely comprehensible without special training. For example, the liturgy of the Roman Catholic Church remained in Latin after the Council of Tours in 813 ordered preaching in local Romance or German, because Latin was no longer understood. Similarly, Old Church Slavonic is incomprehensible to speakers of modern Slavic languages, unless they study it.

Sacred languages are distinct from divine languages, which are languages ascribed to the divine (i.e. God or gods) and may not necessarily be natural languages. The concept, as expressed by the name of a script, for example in Dēvanāgarī, is the name of a script that roughly means "[script] of the city of gods", and is used to write many Indian languages.

== Buddhism ==
When the Buddha's sutras were first written down, probably in Pali, there were around 20 schools, each with their own version derived from the original. The present Pāli Canon originates from the Tamrashatiya school. The Chinese and Tibetan canons mainly derive from the Sarvastivada, originally written in Sanskrit, of which fragments remain. The texts were translated into Chinese and Tibetan.

Theravada Buddhism uses Pali as its main liturgical language and prefers that scripture be studied in the original Pali. Pali is derived from Sanskrit. In Thailand Pali is transliterated into the Thai alphabet, resulting in a Thai pronunciation of the Pali language. Something similar also happened in Myanmar, where Pali is also transliterated into the Burmese alphabet, resulting in a Burmese pronunciation of Pali.

Mahayana Buddhism, now only followed by a small minority in South Asia, makes little use of its original language, Sanskrit, mostly using versions of the local language. In East Asia, Classical Chinese is mainly used. In Japan, texts are written in Chinese characters and read out or recited with the Japanese pronunciations of their constituent characters.

In Vajrayana Buddhism, Tibetan Buddhism is the main surviving school, and Classical Tibetan is the main language used for study, although the Tibetan Buddhist canon was also translated into other languages, such as Mongolian and Manchu. Many items of Sanskrit Buddhist literature have been preserved because they were exported to Tibet, with copies of unknown ancient Sanskrit texts surfacing in Tibet as recently as 2003. Sanskrit was valued in Tibet as the elegant language of the gods. Although in Tibetan Buddhist deity yoga the rest of the sadhana is generally recited in Tibetan, the mantra portion of the practice is usually retained in its original Sanskrit. Whatever language is used, Judith Simmer-Brown explains that a tantric Vajrayana text is often written in an obscure twilight language so that it cannot be understood by anyone without the verbal explanation of a qualified teacher.

In Nepal, the use of Sanskrit as a sacred language survives in the Newar Buddhism, and arguably the vast majority of Sanskrit Buddhist manuscripts have been preserved by this tradition. The Newar Buddhist tradition most prominently employs Sanskrit for all ritual and study purposes, and as such is the only living Buddhist Sanskrit tradition. It is distinct for its emphasis on preserving the Sanskrit originals of many Mahayana and Vajrayana scriptures, which have otherwise been lost in India and survived only in translations in regions like Tibet and China. The Newar Buddhists have continued to copy Sanskrit manuscripts up to the present day. The Newar Buddhist form of Vajrayana is a storehouse of ancient Sanskrit Buddhist texts, many of which are now only extant in Nepal.

Old Tamil was used for Sangam epics of Buddhist and Jain philosophy.

== Christianity ==
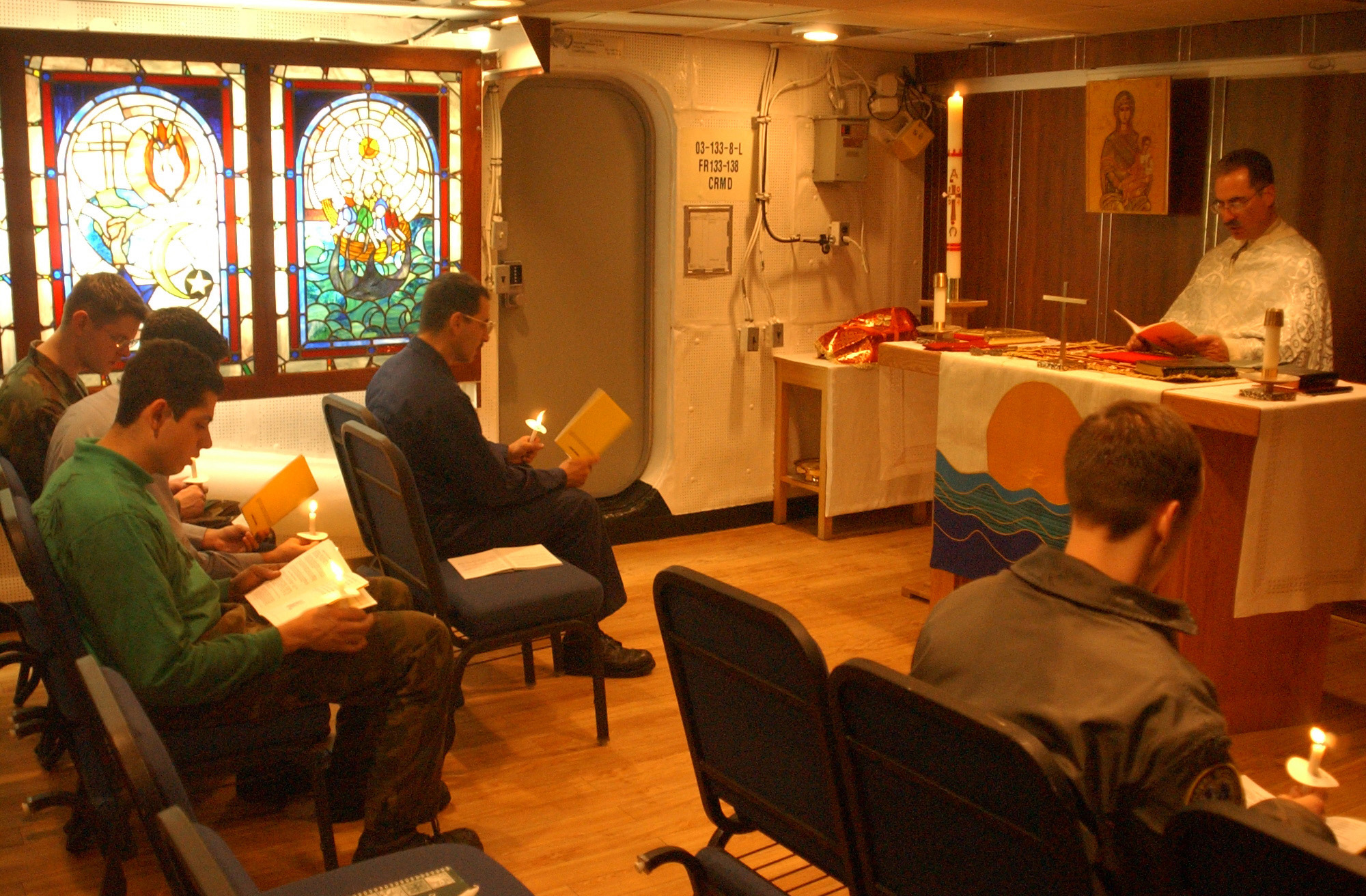
Eastern Orthodox liturgy in the USA

Christian rites, rituals, and ceremonies are not celebrated in one single sacred language. Most churches which trace their origin to the Apostles continue to use the standard languages of the first few centuries AD. Many Christian churches make a distinction between a sacred language, a liturgical language, and a vernacular language. The three most important languages in the early Christian era were Latin, Greek, and Syriac (a dialect of Aramaic).

The Gospel of John notes that the phrase "Jesus, King of the Jews" was inscribed upon the cross of Christ in three different languages, thereby sanctifying them as the first languages to proclaim his divinity. These are:

- Greek, the original language of the New Testament, as well as the Septuagint (a pre-Christian translation of the Hebrew Bible). This was the lingua franca of much of the contemporary Levant.
- Hebrew, the dominant language of the Old Testament (Hebrew Bible). This was the language commonly used among most Jews in the area.
- Latin, the language of the Roman Empire, which soon became an important language of the Christian Church, especially in the western provinces of the Roman Empire as well as being the language of the "First Among Equals", the Pope, in the Christian Pentarchy.

Liturgical languages are those which hold precedence within liturgy due to tradition and dispensation. Many of these languages have evolved from languages which were at one point vernacular, while some are intentional constructions by ecclesial authorities. These include:

- Ecclesiastical Latin in the Latin liturgical rites of the Catholic Church.
- (Old) Church Slavonic in several of the autocephalous Eastern Orthodox Churches and sui iuris Eastern Catholic Churches
- Koine Greek as well as the liturgical language of the Greek Orthodox Church and the Greek Catholic Church.
- Old Georgian in the Georgian Orthodox Church and the Georgian Byzantine-Rite Catholic Church.
- Classical Armenian in the Armenian Apostolic Church and the Armenian Catholic Church.
- Coptic in the Coptic Orthodox Church of Alexandria and Coptic Catholic Church.
- Geʽez in the Ethiopian Orthodox Church, Eritrean Orthodox Church, Ethiopian Catholic Church and Eritrean Catholic Church.
- Syriac in Syriac Christianity represented by the Syriac Orthodox Church, Church of the East, Chaldean Catholic Church, Syriac Catholic Church, Maronite Church and Saint Thomas Christian Churches.

The extensive use of Greek in the Roman Liturgy has continued, in theory; it was used extensively on a regular basis during the Papal Mass, which has not been celebrated for some time. By the reign of Pope Damasus I, the continuous use of Greek in the Roman Liturgy had come to be replaced in part by Latin. Gradually, the Roman Liturgy took on more and more Latin until, generally, only a few words of Hebrew (e.g. Dominus Deus sabaoth) and Greek (e.g. Kyrie eleison) remained. The adoption of Latin was further fostered when the Vetus Latina (old Latin) version of the Bible was edited and parts retranslated from the original Hebrew and Greek by Saint Jerome in his Vulgate. Latin continued as the western Church's language of liturgy and communication.

In the mid-16th century the Council of Trent rejected a proposal to introduce national languages as this was seen, among other reasons, as potentially divisive to Catholic unity.

During the Reformation in England, when the Protestant reformers dissuaded against the use of Latin liturgy, various schools obtained a dispensation to continue to use Latin, for educational purposes. The Act of Uniformity in 1662 formally prohibited use of any language for church services apart from English and Welsh, but college chapels in Oxford and Cambridge Universities were exempted and permitted to use Latin, inasmuch as the highly educated members of the universities were assumed to be familiar with the language. Though the legislation has never been overturned, Latin has been reintroduced as a liturgical language in some English churches, cathedrals and collegiate chapels influenced by the Anglo-Catholic movement.

From the end of the 16th century, in coastal Croatia, the local vernacular language began to replace Church Slavonic as the liturgical language. This change occurred because Church Slavonic, which had been used in the Glagolitic liturgical books published in Rome, was becoming increasingly difficult to understand. This difficulty arose from linguistic reforms that adapted the Church Slavonic of Croatian recension used in Croatia to the norms of Church Slavonic used in Russia. For example, the vernacular was used to ask the bride and groom if they accepted their marriage vows.

Jesuit missionaries to China initially obtained permission to translate the Roman Missal into Classical Chinese, a scholarly form of the language. However, this permission was later revoked amid the Chinese Rites controversy. In contrast, among the Algonquin and Iroquois peoples, missionaries were allowed to translate certain parts of the Mass into their native languages.

In the 20th century, Pope Pius XII granted permission for a few vernaculars to be used in a few rites, rituals, and ceremonies. This did not include the Roman Liturgy of the Mass.

The Catholic Church, long before the Second Vatican Council (Vatican II), had accepted and promoted the use of the non-vernacular liturgical languages listed above; while vernacular (i.e. modern or native) languages were also used liturgically throughout history; usually as a special concession given to religious orders conducting missionary activity.

However, the Council also set out to protect the use of Latin as a liturgical language in the Latin Church. To a large degree, its prescription was disregarded and the vernacular not only became standard, but was generally used exclusively in the liturgy. Latin remains the chief language of the Latin liturgical rites and of Catholic canon law, but the use of liturgical Latin is now discouraged. The use of vernacular language in liturgical practice after 1964 created controversy, and opposition to liturgical vernacular is a major tenet of the Catholic Traditionalist movement. Meanwhile, the numerous Eastern Catholic Churches in union with Rome each have their own respective parent-language, and the Council ruled that in regard to the training of clergy, "the study of the liturgical language proper to each rite should be considered necessary".

Eastern Orthodox churches vary in their use of liturgical languages. Koine Greek and Church Slavonic are the main sacred languages used in communion. Other languages are also permitted for liturgical worship, and each country often has the liturgical services in their own language. This has led to a wide variety of languages used for liturgical worship, but there is still uniformity in the liturgical worship itself.

Languages used in the Eastern Orthodox Church include (but are not limited to): Koine Greek, Church Slavonic, Romanian, Georgian, Arabic, Ukrainian, Belarusian, Bulgarian, Macedonian, Serbian, Montenegrin, English, German, Spanish, French, Polish, Portuguese, Italian, Albanian, Finnish, Swedish, Chinese, Estonian, Latvian, Korean, Japanese, and multiple African languages.

Oriental Orthodox churches outside their ancestral lands regularly pray in the local vernacular, but some clergymen and communities prefer to retain their traditional language or use a combination of languages.

Many Anabaptist groups, such as the Amish, use High German in their worship despite not speaking it amongst themselves.

== Hinduism ==
Hinduism is traditionally considered to have Sanskrit as its primary liturgical language for Vedic hinduism and Tamil as its secondary liturgical language especially for Shaivism and Dravidian Folk Hinduism

=== Sanskrit ===
Sanskrit is the language of the Vedas, Bhagavad Gita, Puranas like the Bhagavatam, the Upanishads, the epics like Ramayana and Mahabharata, and various other liturgical texts such as the Sahasranama, Chamakam, and Rudram.

Sanskrit is also the tongue of Hindu rituals. It also has secular literature along with its religious canon. Most Hindu theologians of later centuries continued to prefer to write in Sanskrit even when it was no longer spoken as a day-to-day language. Sanskrit remains as the only liturgical link language which connects the different strains of Hinduism that are present across India. The de facto position that Sanskrit enjoyed, as the principal language of Hinduism, enabled its survival not only in India, but also in other areas, where Hinduism thrived like Southeast Asia.

=== Old Tamil ===
Old Tamil is the language of the Shaiva (Devaram) and Vaishnava (Divya Prabhandham) scriptures.

=== Classical Telugu ===
Most of Carnatic Music is in Telugu.

Many Hindu epics were also composed in Telugu. Some examples are the Amukthamalayada, Basava Purana, Andhra Mahabharatam, and the Ranganatha Ramayanamu.

=== Others ===
Apart from Sanskrit, several Hindu spiritual works were composed in the various regional languages of India such as Hindi, Assamese, Awadhi, Bhojpuri, Bengali, Odia, Maithili, Punjabi, Gujarati, Kannada, Malayalam, Marathi, Tulu, as well as Old Javanese, and Balinese of Southeast Asia.

== Islam ==
Salah, including Quran recitation must be conducted in Classical Arabic (Qur'anic Arabic), which is the original language of the Qur'an. Muslims believe the Qur'an as divine revelation, and as such it is believed to be the direct word of God. Thus Muslims hold that the Qur'an is only truly the Qur'an if it is precisely as it was revealed—i.e., in Classical Arabic. Translations of the Qur'an into other languages are therefore not treated as the Qur'an itself; rather, they are seen as interpretive texts, which attempt to communicate a translation of the Qur'an's message.

A number of sources require khutbah, the formal Friday sermon, to be delivered completely in classical Arabic. Other sources state that there is no objection if the sermon is conducted in the language understood by most attendees.

== Judaism ==
=== Hebrew ===
The core of the Hebrew Bible is written in Biblical Hebrew, referred to by some Jews as Lashon Hakodesh (לשון הקודש, "Holy Tongue"), as are most prayers in the Siddur. Sifrei Torah, mezuzot, and tefillin are written (and heard, in the case the Sefer Torah) in Hebrew using the Assyrian script. Likewise, during Purim, the Book of Esther may be read and heard in Hebrew.

=== Aramaic ===
Much of the Gemara is written in Aramaic. Aramaic also remains the language of important liturgical and religious texts, including the Kaddish and several classical translations of the Torah and the Hebrew Bibile. According to halakhic sources, during Purim, the Book of Esther may be read from a translation in another language and heard in that language, including Aramaic.

=== Greek ===
According to halakhic sources, Greek is the only language other than Hebrew in which a Sifrei Torah, mezuzot, and tefillin may be written (and heard, in the case the Sefer Torah). The Book of Esther may likewise be read and heard in Greek.

Some halakhic authorities, however, distinguish between the Ancient Greek referred to in rabbinic sources and later forms of the language, including Medieval Greek and Modern Greek; leading to discussion regarding the practical applicability of these rulings.

=== Ladino ===
Among the Sephardim, Ladino was used for translations such as the Ferrara Bible. It was also used during the Sephardi liturgy. Ladino is also often referred to as Judeo-Spanish, as it is a dialect of Castilian used by Sephardim as an everyday language until the 20th century.

== List ==
- Akkadian was a long used liturgical language.
- Aramaic, used in some later books of the Tanakh, some Jewish prayers, and the Talmud.
- Avestan, the language of the Avesta, the sacred texts of Zoroastrianism.
- Bahasa tanah, a sacred language used in special traditional ceremonies of the Alfur people in Maluku and is generally written using the Alifuru script. It literally means 'language of the land'.
- Balaibalan was invented in the context of Sufi devotion, although it was only briefly used.
- Christian Bengali, the language of Christian worship and Bengali Christian literature restricted to the Anglo-Bengali Christian community
- Classical Arabic, the language of the Quran; it differs from the various forms of contemporary spoken Arabic in lexical and grammatical areas.
- Classical Chinese, the language of older Chinese literature and the Confucian, Taoist, and in East Asia also of the Mahayana Buddhist sacred texts. The current pronunciation of Chinese characters is based on local pronunciation, for example Japanese Buddhists read Buddhist texts in Japanese Kanji pronunciation.
- Coptic, a form of ancient Egyptian, is used by the Coptic Orthodox Church of Alexandria and the Coptic Catholic Church.
- Old Czech is used by the Moravian Church.
- Damin, an initiation language of the Lardil people in Australia.
- Early Modern Dutch is the language of the Statenvertaling, still in use among orthodox Calvinist denominations in the Netherlands.
- Early Modern English is used in some parts of the Anglican Communion and by the Continuing Anglican movement, as well as by a variety of English-speaking Protestants.
- Eskayan in the Philippines.
- Etruscan, cultivated for religious and magical purposes in the Roman Empire.
- Geʽez, the predecessor of many Ethiopian Semitic languages (e.g. Amharic, Tigrinya, Tigre) used as a liturgical language by Ethiopian Jews and by Ethiopian and Eritrean Christians (in the Ethiopian Orthodox Tewahedo Church, the Eritrean Orthodox Tewahedo Church, and the Roman Catholic Church).
- Early New High German is used in Amish communities for Bible readings and sermons.
- Gothic, the sole East Germanic language which is attested by significant texts, is usually considered to have been preserved by the Arian churches, while the Goths themselves spoke vulgar Latin dialects of their areas.
- Koine Greek, the language of early Pauline Christianity and all of its New Testament books. It is today the liturgical language of Greek Orthodox Christianity and several other directly Greek connected Eastern Orthodox Churches. It differs markedly from Modern Greek but remains comprehensible for Modern Greek speakers.
- Habla Congo (or Habla Bantu) is a Kongo-based liturgical language of the Palo religion with origins in Cuba, later spreading to other countries in the Caribbean Basin.
- Hattic was used by the Hittites who spoke an unrelated language.
- Biblical Hebrew – the languages in which the Hebrew Bible has been written over time; these differ from today's spoken Hebrew in lexical and grammatical areas.
- Jamaican Maroon Spirit Possession Language, spoken by Jamaican Maroons, the descendants of runaway slaves in the mountains of Jamaica, during their "Kromanti Play", a ceremony in which the participants are said to be possessed by their ancestors and to speak as their ancestors did centuries ago.
- Early Middle Japanese is chanted in Shinto rituals.
- Old Javanese is utilized in Kejawèn, the polytheistic ethnic religion of the Javanese people.
- Kallawaya, a secret medicinal language used in the Andes.
- Ecclesiastical Latin is the liturgical language of the Latin Church's Latin liturgical rites of the Catholic Church. It is based on the Italian pronunciation.
- Old Latin was used in various prayers in Roman paganism, such as the Carmen Arvale and Carmen Saliare. These texts were unintelligible to classical Latin speakers and remain somewhat obscure to scholars even today.
- Manchu was the language used in Manchu shamanic rituals.
- Mandaic, an Aramaic language, in Mandaeanism.
- Classical Meitei, the holy language of Sanamahism (Meitei religion).
- Classical Mongolian was used alongside Classical Tibetan as sacred languages of Tibetan Buddhism in Mongolia.
- Old Norse, used in some Heathenry groups as a religious language
- Palaic and Luwian, cultivated as a religious language by the Hittites.
- Pali, the original language of Theravada Buddhism.
- Some Portuguese and Latin prayers are retained by the Kakure Kirishitan (Hidden Christians) of Japan, who recite it without understanding the language.
- Sant Bhasha, a mélange of archaic Punjabi and several other languages, is the language of the Sikh holy scripture Guru Granth Sahib. It is different from the various dialects of Punjabi that exist today.
- Vedic & Classical Sanskrit, the dialects of the Vedas and other sacred texts of Hinduism as well as the original language of several sects of early Buddhism and a language of Jainism.
- Old Church Slavonic, also called Old Bulgarian, the liturgical language of the Slavic Eastern Orthodoxy
- Church Slavonic is the current liturgical language of the Russian Orthodox Church, Serbian Orthodox Church, Bulgarian Orthodox Church and the Macedonian Orthodox Church and certain Byzantine (Ruthenian) Eastern Catholic churches.
- Sumerian, cultivated and preserved in Assyria and Babylon long after its extinction as an everyday language.
- Syriac, a dialect of Aramaic, is used as a liturgical language by Syriac Christians who belong to the Chaldean Catholic Church, Assyrian Church of the East, Syriac Orthodox Church, Syriac Catholic Church, Syro Malabar Catholic Church and Maronite Church.
- Old Tamil is the language of the Shaiva (Devaram) and Vaishnava (Divya Prabhandham) scriptures.
- Classical Tibetan, known as Chhokey in Bhutan, the sacred language of Tibetan Buddhism.
- Yoruba (known as Lucumi in Cuba), the language of the Yoruba people, brought to the New World by enslaved Africans, and preserved in Santería, Candomblé, and other African diasporic religions. The Yoruba descendants in these communities, as well as non-descendants that have adopted one of the Yoruba-based religions in the diaspora, no longer speak any of the Yoruba dialects with any level of fluency, and the liturgical usage also reflects the compromise of the language whereby there does not exist an understanding of correct grammar nor proper intonation. Spirit possession by the Yoruba deities in Cuba shows that the deity manifested in the devotee at a Cuban orisa ceremony delivers messages to the faithful in Bozal, a type of Spanish-based creole with some words of Yoruba language as well as those of Bantu origin with an inflection similar to the way Africans would speak as they were learning Spanish during enslavement.
