= Humberto Cané =

Cuban musician (1918–2000)

Humberto Cané (1918-2000) was a Cuban musician who played an influential role in the Latin American music scene in Havana, Mexico City and Los Angeles. He was born in Matanzas, Cuba in 1918. His father was Valentin Cané, the founder of the well-known musical group Sonora Matancera, with whom Humberto played the tres guitar. He later played with other groups such as Conjunto Azul and Conjunto Camacho. In 1945-1946, he moved to Mexico City which was then a key centre for Latin American music and cinema and thus attracted talent from around the Hispanic world. Humberto Cané was a sought-after bassist, arranger and bandleader; his band was called Conjunto Humberto Cané. The legendary Cuban singer Benny Moré sang and recorded with Cané's band at the beginning of his solo career.

Later on, Humberto played bass for Trío Los Panchos and toured with the black Mexican singer Toña La Negra. Returning to Mexico, he formed another highly successful group with Yeyo Estrada called Conjunto Yeyo y Cané. In the early 1960s, he relocated to Los Angeles where he remained until his death. He played with the Rene Bloch Orchestra and other Cuban music groups in and around the Los Angeles region.
