= Manguito =

Brazilian footballer

Personal information
- Full name: Alberto Gonçalves
- Date of birth: 28 August 1953
- Place of birth: Rio de Janeiro, Brazil
- Date of death: 16 December 2012 (aged 59)
- Place of death: Rio de Janeiro, Brazil
- Position: Centre-back

Youth career
- Pavunense

Senior career*
Years	Team	Apps	(Gls)
1974–1976	Olaria		
1976	CSA		
1977–1978	Grêmio Maringá		
1978–1981	Flamengo	116	(1)
1981	→ Al Nassr (loan)		
1982	Taubaté		
1983	Vitória-ES		
1984	Rio Branco-ES		
1984	União Rondonópolis		
1987	Ferroviário de Tubarão		
- * Club domestic league appearances and goals as of 1 June 2024

Alberto Gonçalves (28 August 1953 – 16 December 2012), better known as Manguito, was a Brazilian footballer who played as a centre-back.

== Career ==
Revealed by Pavunense FC, Manguito played for Olaria, CSA and Grêmio Maringá before arriving at Flamengo, where he was Brazilian champion in 1980, and played 116 matches for the club. He also worked for Al Nassr, Taubaté, Vitória-ES, Rio Branco-ES, União Rondonópolis and Ferroviário de Tubarão.

== Honours ==
Grêmio Maringá

- Campeonato Paranaense: 1977

Flamengo

- Campeonato Brasileiro: 1980
- Campeonato Carioca: 1978, 1979, 1979 (Extra)
- Taça Guanabara: 1979, 1980, 1981
- Ramón de Carranza Trophy: 1979, 1980

== Death ==
Manguito suffered cerebral ischemia while walking near the Lapa arches, in Rio de Janeiro. He died a few days later on 16 December 2012.
