= Cabildo (Cuba) =

African cultural cofraternities in Colonial Cuba

Cabildos de nación were African ethnic associations created in Cuba in the late 16th century based on the Spanish cofradías (guilds or fraternities) that were organized in Seville for the first time around the 14th century. The Sevillian cofradías had the tutelage of a Catholic saint and were held in the saint’s chapel.

"One of the earliest known Cabildos de nación in Cuba was Mandinga Zape (1568)" The first cabildo on Compostela street in Havana was built in a lot purchased in 1691 by the Arará family. The same lot is still known as el solar de los Arará (the Arará’s lot). At the time the African population in Cuba was not as significant as it was after the 19th century with the sugar boom. Cabildos were organized by slaves belonging to the same ethnic group and became very popular in the urban areas.

== Benefits brought by the cabildos ==
Spanish legislation supported the cabildos as means of entertainment for the slave population, and as social control alleviating the tensions between the masters and the slaves. Slaves were allowed to gather on holidays so that they could dance according to the customs of their African nations.

For the slaves, the cabildo had many uses. They were able to collect money or pool resources to assist members in times of illness or death. Cabildos also had a religious purpose, they were the place where slaves could consult their deities and ancestors. For those slaves who clung to the religious traditions of Africa, a cabildo was one of the few means of succor at their disposal. The cabildo represented Africa in foreign territory that would help slaves keep alive their faith. Cabildos were institutions that made possible the conservation of the idiosyncrasy, religion and culture of the African nations in Cuba. The songs, dances, and drum rhythms that were played for African deities in a land that was so hostile to the Africans slaves were the mechanism by which slaves were able to keep alive their Africanness and resist Spanish cultural hegemony.

== Tensions caused by the cabildos ==
White Spanish and Cuban criollos saw cabildos as a necessary evil. By the 18th century, these spaces of cultural autonomy and support began to worry slaves' white masters. Articles of the 1792 Bando de Buen Gobierno y Policia address the necessity of controlling the cabildos and their members. Neighbors often complained about the unpleasant noises made by the slaves as they sang and played African instruments. By the 19th century, cabildos were re-located outside the walls of the city of Havana so that whites would not have to see or hear their African celebrations. For the Afro-Cubans, this expulsion added a degree of privacy that they had previously lacked.

== The decline of the cabildos ==
By the early 19th century cabildos were practically extinct after failed rebellions by the African slaves. There was a revival in their number in the mid-19th century, when they were no longer limited to slaves but welcomed free Afro-Cubans of all walks of life. In 1884, the Cuban government outlawed the Epiphany, a celebration cabildos practiced for more than a century on 6 January, which included parading as comparsas down the streets of Havana. In 1887, new laws required cabildos to obtain prior official recognition and licenses. Since slavery had by then been abolished, the authorities sought new means of controlling the free Afro-Cuban population. In 1888 the government forced cabildos to organize as mutual-aid societies following the established laws for white Cuban societies.

== Names and origins of Cabildos ==
Slaves were differentiated by their white owners according to their place of origin, with a variety of different names that identified distinct ethnicities from Africa. The names were corruptions of traditional tribal names devised by the slave owners, but they were soon used by the slaves themselves.

Name of Cabildo	African region of origin	Ethnic group of origin
Abakuá	Nigeria/Cameroon	Ekpe
Mandinga	Sierra Leone	Malinké
Ganga	Sierra Leone	Sherbro
Mina	Ghana	Akan
Lucumi	Benin and Nigeria	Yoruba
Carabalis	Nigeria	Igbo - Efik
Macauas	Mozambique	Makua
Congo	Angola and Congo	Bantu

== See also ==
- Afro-Cuban
- Santería
- Palenques in Mexico
