= Habla Congo =

Kongo-based liturgical language of Cuba

- Habla Bantu
- lengua
- Native to: Cuba
- Native speakers: None (liturgical language)
- Language family: Kongo–Spanish

Language codes
- ISO 639-3: –
- Glottolog: None
- Guthrie code: H.10C

Habla Congo or Habla Bantú is a Kongo-based liturgical language of the Palo religion with origins in Cuba, later spreading to other countries in the Caribbean Basin. It originated from Bakongo people enslaved in Spanish America, during the Atlantic Slave Trade. The language may be called lengua conga or lengua congo but is generally referred to simply as lengua, meaning "language" in Spanish. It involves code-switching between Kongo-derived words and phrases; Bozal Spanish, the archaic Spanish creole of the Caribbean slave plantations, or at least an imitation of it; and colloquial Caribbean Spanish.

A palero (Palo priest) would say that he habla congo (or habla conga) "speaks Kongo," habla en congo, or habla palero. It is not secret, but it is intended to be impenetrable to the uninitiated.

== See also ==
- Lucumí, a similar liturgical language based on Yoruba
