= Ray Martínez =

American dance music icon (born 1950)

Ray Martínez is an American dance music musician, songwriter, and singer in the late 1970s and 1980s, and later became a record producer, engineer, and record label owner/executive. He helped originate what became known as the "Miami Sound", created out of an independent record label of that era, TK Records. He created Paris International Records, his own independently owned label, which released multiple dance hits during the era.

== Early years ==
Martínez was born in Cuba to an American father and a Cuban mother. Although he and his family commuted between the United States and Cuba, Martínez permanently moved to Miami, Florida, at the age of ten. Having studied piano since the age of five, he graduated from Miami Dade Community College, and continued his higher education at Florida Atlantic University, majoring in Music and Business. He also pursued post-graduate courses.

At the age of sixteen, Martinez first became involved with music by playing in local bands. In 1973, while playing at The Seven Seas Lounge, a Miami night club, he was asked to join the band, Frankie Valli and the Four Seasons.

== Career ==
In 1975, Martínez returned to Miami and went to work at T.K. Records, where he learned his craft from Henry Stone. Starting out as a studio musician, Martinez stayed after hours, watching and learning. He became a recording engineer, later advancing to chief engineer, eventually producing most of the artists at T.K. He went on to produce hits for several small and large music labels worldwide.

At T.K., Martínez experimented with "Afro-Cuban" percussion, and mixed it with the R & B sound that T.K. was known for to originate the "Miami Sound".

In 1978, he formed the studio group, Amant, which had disco hits with the tracks "If There Is Love" and "Hazy Shades of Love". Both tracks peaked at number five on the disco chart. As an engineer/producer/artist, he was involved in many Billboard nationally charted records, several gold records worldwide, a Grammy nominee, and several Billboard Awards. In 2006, he was inducted into one of Europe's "Dance Music Halls Of Fame".

== Executive career ==
At T.K., Martínez was influential in introducing the concept of the 12-inch record for promotional purposes. He founded and served as operating president of Paris International, an independent label. Martínez taught seminars at the University of Miami in music business and production, and established many new promotion and distribution concepts that later became industry standards.

After retirement in the early 1990s, Martínez continued working as a consultant for several music companies and entertainment attorneys. He also ran a family-owned real estate acquisition/investment company.

=== Paris Music Group ===
In 2006, Martínez decided to come out of retirement, and opened Paris Music Group.
