= Gustavo Tamayo =

Colombian ophthalmologist

Gustavo E. Tamayo is a Colombian ophthalmologist known for developing a refractive surgery method known as Contoured Ablation Patterns (CAP), which enables doctors to make surgeries faster and at an easier rate. Tamayo has also developed and patented a procedure to treat presbyopia, which is at the moment being tested by AMO (Abbott Medical Optics) in order to massively apply this procedure in a global manner once approved by the FDA. He also has other patents dealing with cataract removal through laser application. Tamayo was designated subdirector of the Subspecialty Refractive Surgery Day at American Academy of Ophthalmology meeting in 2008 which took place in Atlanta and was appointed director for the same meeting in its 2009 edition. He is the president and founder of a surgical eye clinic in the north of Bogotá founded in 2001 called Bogota Laser Ocular Surgery Center. Tamayo also serves as a Member of the Medical Advisory Board at AMO, Presbia, Keramet and currently serves as the medical director for Latin America of Avedro. Tamayo is a member of various medical associations, including the American Academy of Ophthalmology, The Cornea Society, and both the American and European Societies of Cataract & Refractive Surgery.
