= Arará =

Cuban religion formed in the 1800s

Arará is an African diasporic religion that developed in Cuba during the late 19th century. It is sometimes regarded as a distinct religion of its own, and at other times as a variant of Santería.

Its origins come from people descended from the Dahomey kingdom of West Africa, and retaining an identity, religion, and culture separate from those of other Afro-Cubans peoples. Although, historically, the Arará people have been staunch defenders of their separate heritage and religion, this distinct identity - while it still persists - has, over time, become increasingly blurred and harder to maintain.

== Definitions ==
Arará is a religion of Dahomean origins. The ethnomusicologist María Teresa Vélez noted that Arará was "closely related" to Santería; although its origins are not Yoruba, it is sometimes considered a branch of Santería rather than a separate system.

The religion is centred in Matanzas although has followers in Las Villas and Oriente. By the start of the 21st century, it was reported to not have any presence in Havana. Arará exists in at least three subgroups: Arará Magino (Machino or Marino), Arará Savalú (Sabalú), and Arará Dajomé (Dahomey).

== Beliefs ==
The spirits of Arará are referred to as vodú or foddún. These are believed to communicate with their followers via divination and possession. They are also identified with the orichas of Santería.

== Practices ==
Music is a key part of Arará rituals. Although different names have been used for the ritual drums over the years, at the close of the 20th century they were commonly called caja, mula, and cachimbo. At the end of the 20th century, Arará music ensembles typically used two to four drums, an iron bell, and a metal rattle, although historical accounts suggest that older ensembles used four to five drums. These drums are regarded as sacred after they have undergone a particular ceremony.

== History ==
The Arará were originally enslaved as prisoners-of-war in the invasions of Dahomey by the Oyo Empire. Later, they were transported to Cuba. Years later, Yoruba slaves descended from the Oyo Empire began to be taken to Cuba, too. Due to the pre-existing tensions in West Africa these two groups remained socially distant and developed separate cultures and identities. Despite close similarities in their religious practices, both groups retained separate priesthoods. In the 1890s to early 1900s that Arará and Yoruba Cubans became comfortable enough in each other's company to begin to mix culturally, resulting in the Arará adoption of Santeria customs in guidance of ceremonies. Today, many practitioners of Arara use Yoruba terminology to explain their practices, but continue to use unique ceremonial dances. Some of these dances are similar to dances in Haitian Vodou because of their shared heritage, but the dances remain different. Many Arará traditions have mixed with other Afro-Cuban traditions and retention of a solid Arará identity in heritage and culture has become difficult as over time various differing traditions and peoples have melded in a growing sense of Afro-Cuban cultural exchange, especially in religious practices.

== See also ==
- Haitian Vodou drumming
