= Roel Caboverde Llacer =

Cuban graphic artist, painter and teacher (born 1947)

- Born: November 20, 1947 (age 78); Baracoa, Cuba
- Education: School of Fine Arts, Guantánamo (graduated 1987)
- Known for: Painting; graphic arts; visual arts instruction

Roel Caboverde Llacer (born 20 November 1947, Baracoa) is a Cuban graphic artist, painter, and teacher, whose great-grandmother was a slave from Cape Verde, named Caridad Cabo Verde.

He grew up in the towns of La Poa and Moa and started his painting career as a house painter followed by work painting signs. He even painted murals during his service in the military. After, he the service, he trained as a visual arts instructor in the School of Fine Arts in the provincial capital of Guantánamo, graduating in 1987. His paintings have been exhibited in the Netherlands, France, Italy, Germany, United States, Dominican Republic, Costa Rica and Japan. He currently lives and teaches in Baracoa.
