= Fortunato Vizcarrondo =

Puerto Rican composer

- Born: Fortunato Vizcarrondo Calderon; March 13, 1895; Carolina, Puerto Rico
- Died: November 18, 1977 (aged 82); San Juan, Puerto Rico
- Resting place: Cementerio Municipal de Carolina
- Education: University of Puerto Rico
- Occupation: Poet
- Spouse: Generosa Martínez Y Pérez (1918-1982)
- Children: 8

Fortunato Vizcarrondo Calderon (1895–1977) was an Afro-Puerto Rican composer, professor, and poet. He is best known for his poem "¿Y Tu Abuela Donde Esta?".

== Early life ==
Fortunato Vizcarrondo Calderon was born on March 13, 1895, in Carolina, Puerto Rico, the son of Fortunato Vizcarrondo Y Mongrand and Rosenda Asunción Rodón Y Quiñonez.

== Life and career ==
Studied music at a young age under the tutelage of professor Manuel Barasoaín Julbe. Joined several of orchestras where he played wind instrument. Graduated as an English teacher from the University of Puerto Rico and worked as a teacher in Carolina and Río Grande for 10 years. After that he worked as mailman for the United States Postal Service. At the beginning of the 60s due to the inauguration of the music conservatory in Hato Rey got to learned more about music from that institution. Retired from the Postal Service after 26 years of service and became a music teacher where he taught in Río Grande, Vieques and Carolina where he was the director of the municipal band.

== Personal life ==
He married Generosa Martínez Pérez in 1918, gaining a step-daughter named Iluminada Díaz Y Martínez (1917). The marriage produced seven children:

- Rosa A. (1919)
- Fortunato, III (1920)
- Elmer Americus (1921)
- Aurea Asunción (1922)
- Dolores (1926)
- Mildred (1928)
- Carmen Lydia (1935)

== Death ==
In the last years of Fortunato's life, he suffered from ill health. In December 1977, he had a diabetic shock and slipped into a coma. He spent two weeks at Hospital Presbiteriano, where he died on November 18, 1977, at 82. Fortunato's body was interred in The Municipal Cemetery in Carolina.

== Works ==
- ¿Y Tu Abuela Donde Esta? (1942)
- Dinga y Mandinga (1976)
