= Oscar Hernández Falcón =

Cuban guitarist and composer

Oscar Hernández Falcón (Havana, 15 March 1891 – 3 March 1967) was a Cuban guitarist and composer. His best-known compositions include the bolero "La Rosa Roja".
