= Latin music =

Music from Ibero-America or sung in Spanish or Portuguese

- Native name: Música latina
- Stylistic origins: Music of Latin America Music of Spain Music of Portugal
- Cultural origins: Early 1940s, Ibero-America

Subgenres
- Latin jazz; Latin pop; Latin R&B; Latin rock/rock en español; Latin urban; Regional Mexican; Tropical music

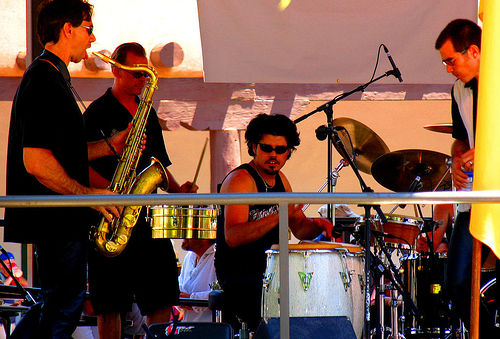
Salsa

Latin music (Portuguese and Spanish: música latina) is a term used by the music industry as a catch-all category for various styles of Spanish- and Portuguese-language music genres from Latin America, Spain, Portugal, and the Latino diaspora in Canada and the United States, as well as music sung in either language. It may also include music from other territories where Spanish- and Portuguese-language music is made.

== Terminology and categorization ==
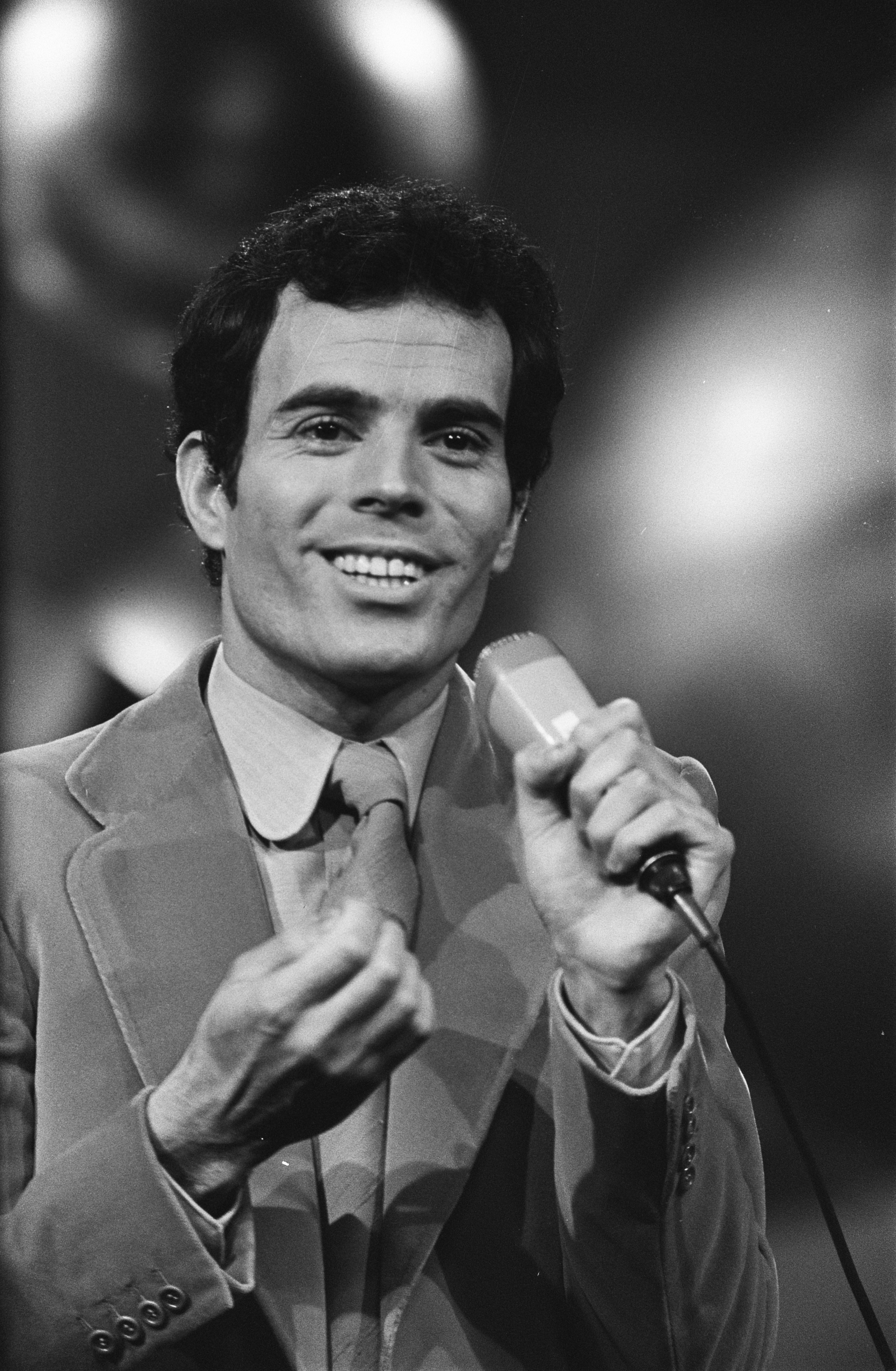
Spanish singer Julio Iglesias was recognized by the Guinness World Records in 2013 as the best-selling male Latin artist of all time.

Because the majority of Latino immigrants living in New York City in the 1950s were of Puerto Rican or Cuban descent, "Latin music" had been stereotyped as music simply originating from the Spanish Caribbean. The popularization of bossa nova and Herb Alpert's Mexican-influenced sounds in the 1960s did little to change the perceived image of Latin music. In 1969, the first international organization which attempted to define Latin music was the Festival Mundial de la Canción Latina which included Spanish, Portuguese, French, and Italian-speaking countries across Latin America and Europe. However, the event only lasted for two years. Since then, the music industry classifies all music sung in Spanish or Portuguese as Latin music, including musics from Spain and Portugal.

Following protests from Latinos in New York, a category for Latin music was created by National Recording Academy (NARAS) for the Grammy Awards titled Best Latin Recording in 1975. Enrique Fernandez wrote in Billboard that the lone category for Latin music meant that all Latin music genres had to compete with each other despite the distinct sounds of the genre. He also noted that the accolade was usually given to performers of tropical music. Eight years later, the organization debuted three new categories for Latin music: Best Latin Pop Performance, Best Mexican/Mexican-American Performance, and Best Tropical Latin Performance. Latin pop is a catch-all for any pop music sung in Spanish, while Mexican/Mexican-American (also to referred to as Regional Mexican) is defined as any musical style originating from Mexico or influences by its immigrants in the United States including Tejano, and tropical music is any music from the Spanish Caribbean.

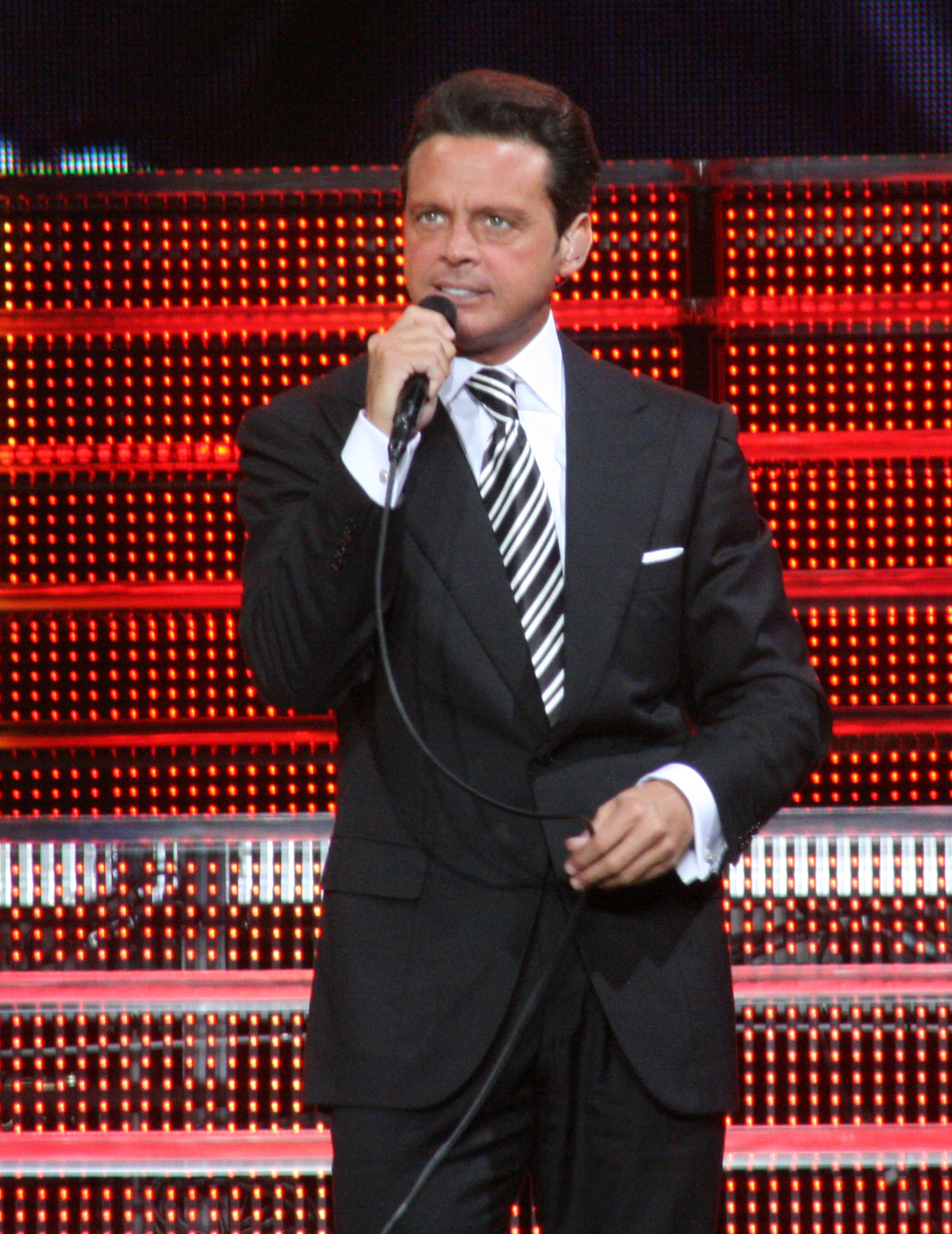
Luis Miguel who has captivated audiences in Latin America and beyond for decades.

In 1997, NARAS established the Latin Recording Academy (LARAS) in an effort to expand its operations in both Latin America and Spain. In September 2000, LARAS launched the Latin Grammy Awards, a separate award ceremony from the Grammy Awards. Its organizers stated that the Latin music universe was too large to fit within the Grammys. Michael Greene, former head of NARAS, said that the process of creating the Latin Grammy Awards was complicated due to the diverse Latin musical styles, noting that the only thing they had in common was language. As a result, the Latin Grammy Awards are presented to records performed in Spanish or Portuguese, while the organization focuses on music from Latin America, Spain, and Portugal.

Since the late 1990s, the United States has seen increasing growth in its population of "Latinos", a term popularized since the 1960s due to confusing the wrong term "Spanish" with the more proper but less popular term "Hispanic". The music industry in the United States began to refer to any kind of music featuring Spanish vocals as "Latin music". Under this definition, Spanish sung in any genre is categorized as "Latin". In turn, this has led to artists from Spain being labelled as "Latin" because they sing in the same language.

The Recording Industry Association of America (RIAA) and Billboard magazine use this definition of Latin music to track sales of Spanish-language records in the United States. Billboard however considers an artist to be "Latin" if they perform in Spanish or Portuguese. The RIAA initiated the "Los Premios de Oro y Platino" ("The Gold and Platinum Awards" in Spanish) in 2000 to certify sales of Latin music albums and singles under a different threshold than its standard certifications. Billboard divides its Latin music charts into three subcategories: Latin pop, Regional Mexican, and tropical. A fourth subcategory was added in the mid 2000s to address the rise of Latin urban music genres such as Latin hip hop and reggaeton.

== History ==
=== 1940s–1950s ===
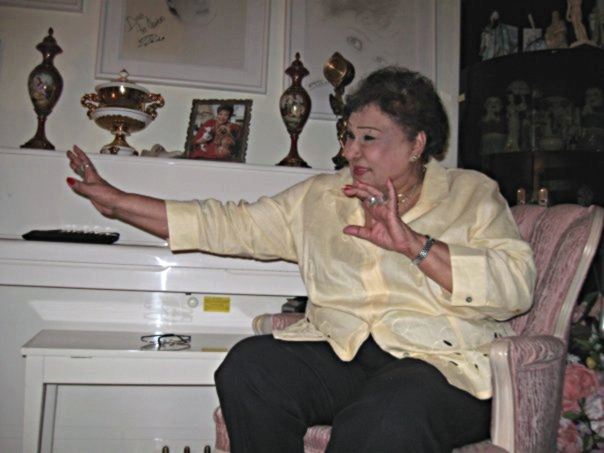
Olga Guillot

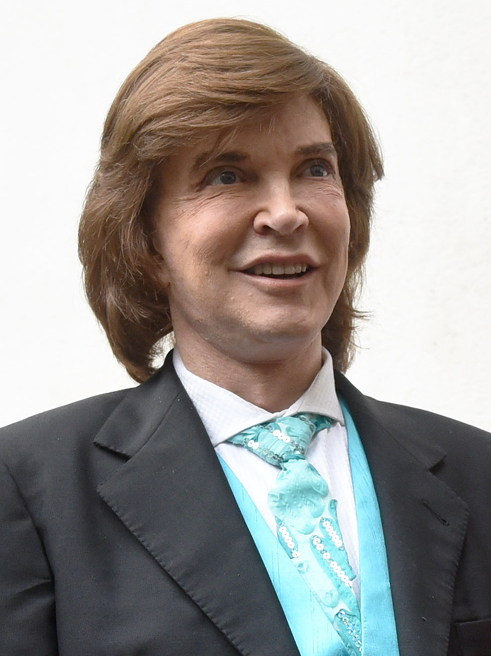
Camilo Sesto in 2017

The term "Latin music" originated from the United States due to the growing influence of Latino Americans in the American music market, including pioneers Xavier Cugat (1940s) and Tito Puente (1950s) and accelerating in later decades. As one author explained the rising popularity from the 1940s: "Latin America, the one part of the world not engulfed in World War II, became a favorite topic for songs and films for Americans who wanted momentarily to forget about the conflagration." Wartime propaganda for America's "Good Neighbor Policy" further enhanced the cultural impact. Pérez Prado composed such famous pieces as "Mambo No. 5" and "Mambo No. 8". At the height of the mambo movement in 1955, Pérez hit number one on the American charts with a cha-cha-chá version of "Cherry Pink and Apple Blossom White". "El manisero", known in English as "The Peanut Vendor", is a Cuban son-pregón composed by Moisés Simons. Together with "Guantanamera", it is arguably the most famous piece of music created by a Cuban musician. "The Peanut Vendor" has been recorded more than 160 times, sold over a million copies of sheet music, and was the first million-selling 78 rpm single of Cuban music.

=== 1960s ===
The Brazilian bossa nova became widespread in Latin America and later became an international trend, led especially by Antônio Carlos Jobim. Rock en español became popular with the younger generation of Latinos in Latin America, for example the Argentine band Almendra. Mexican-American Latin rock guitarist Carlos Santana began decades of popularity. By the late 60s, the boogaloo boom was coming, and boogaloo musicians such as Pérez Prado, Tito Rodríguez and Tito Puente released boogaloo singles and albums. Most of the other groups were young musicians such as Pucho & His Latin Soul Brothers and Joe Bataan.

Early examples of boogaloo were 1966 music by Richie Ray and Bobby Cruz. The biggest boogaloo hit of the '60s was "Bang Bang" by the Joe Cuba Sextet in 1966. Hits by other groups included Johnny Colón's "Boogaloo Blues", Pete Rodríguez's "I Like It like That"(1967).

=== 1970s ===
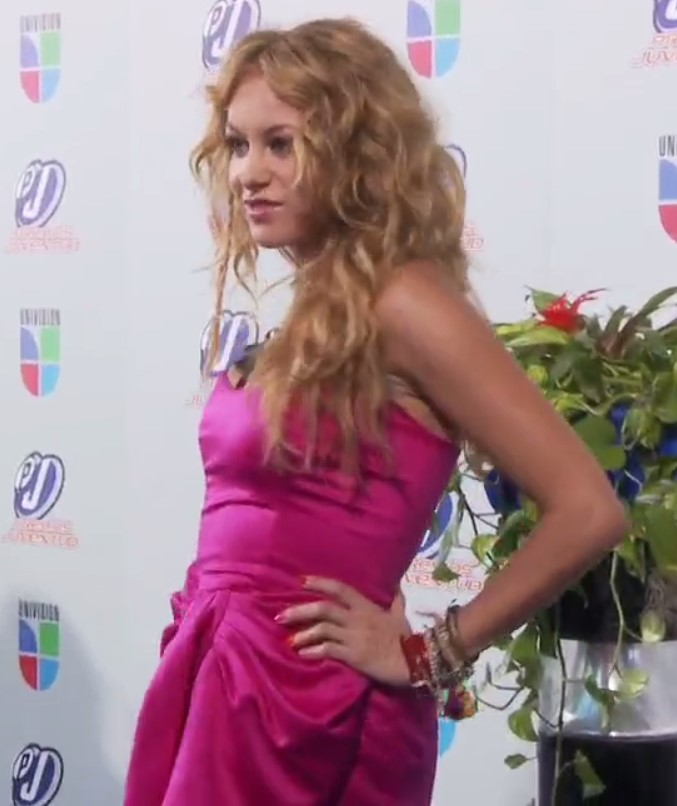
Paulina Rubio at Premios Juventud red carpet in July 2009

Salsa music became the dominant genre of tropical music in the 1970s. Fania Records was credited for popularizing salsa music, with acts such as Rubén Blades, Héctor Lavoe, and Celia Cruz expanding the audience. In the late 1970s, an influx of balladeers from Spain such as Julio Iglesias, Camilo Sesto, and Raphael established their presence on the music charts both in Latin America and the US Latin market. In 1972, OTI Festival was established by the Organización de Telecomunicaciones de Iberoamérica as a songwriting contest to interconnect the Ibero-American countries (Latin America, Spain, and Portugal). Ramiro Burr of Billboard remarked that the contest was considered to be the "largest and most prestigious songwriting festival in the Latin music world".

=== 1980s ===
In the 1980s, the Latin ballad continued to be the main form of Latin pop music, with Juan Gabriel, José José, Julio Iglesias, Roberto Carlos, and José Luis Rodríguez dominating the charts. Salsa music lost some traction, and its rhythm slowed with more emphasis on romantic lyrics. This became known as the salsa romantica era.

=== 1990s ===
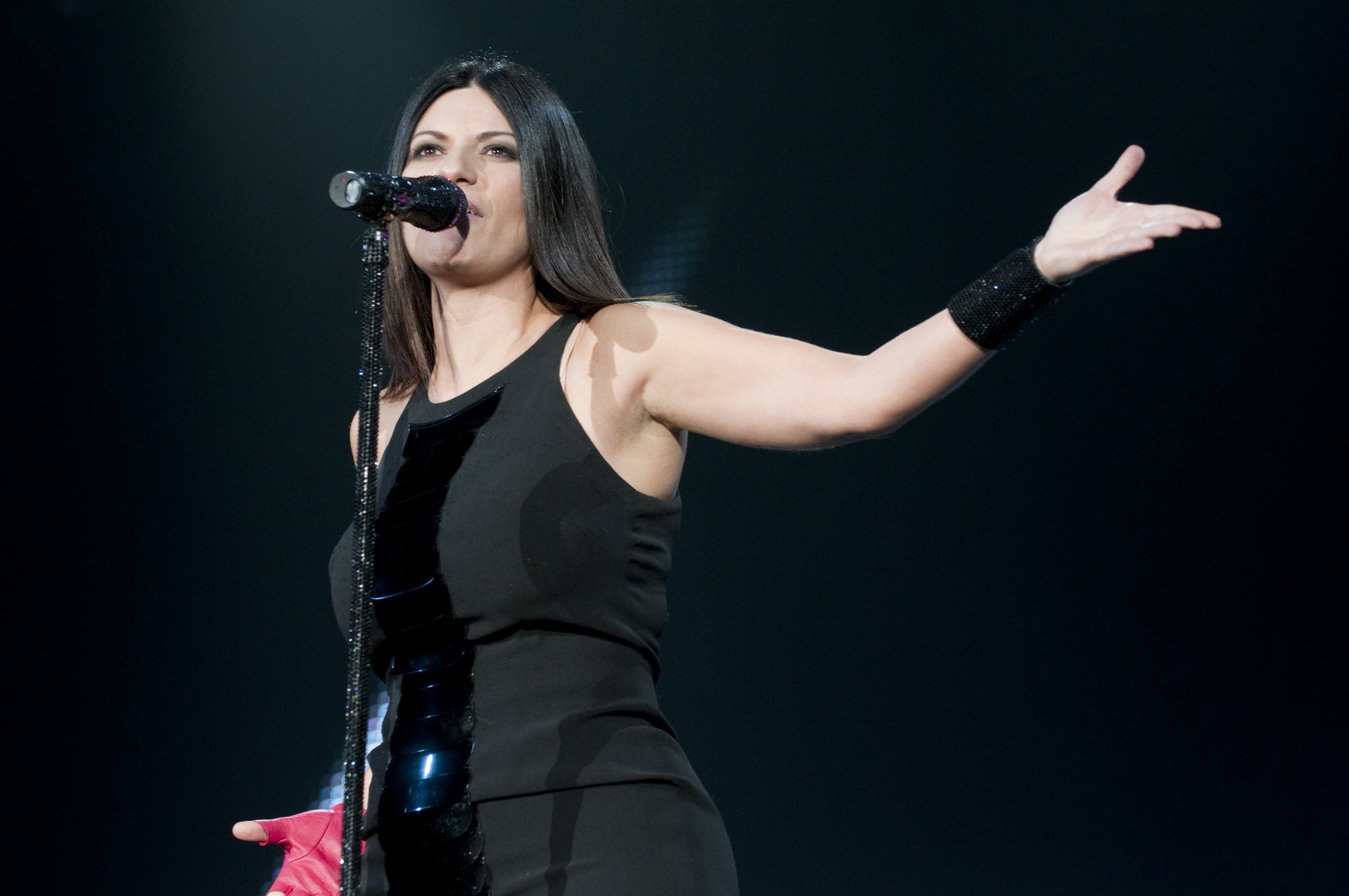
Laura Pausini performing during the World Tour 2009

In the Regional Mexican field, Tejano music became the most prominent genre and one of the fastest-growing music genres in the United States. On January 10, 1990, EMI Latin bought Bob Grever's Cara Records, beginning the golden age of Tejano music. Tejano music's growth exploded, as journalist Ramiro Burr put it "a stubborn brushfire spread over the horizon", the genre converted radio stations to play Tejano music. This garnered the attention of record labels across the United States who were eager to expand their rosters. In 1991, Warner Nashville created Warner Discos specifically for Tejano artists crossing over into country music while Arista Nashville erected Artista Texas with the same objective. Other labels such as PolyGram Latino and WEA Latina began deliberations to exclusively sign Tejano acts, while Fonovisa began signing Tejano musicians. These incentives helped expand performers' fanbases beyond Texas and the southwest. It also brought the genre to territories unfamiliar with the genre. The golden age is generally considered by journalists to have ended on March 31, 1995, when Selena was shot and killed. Tejano music set five consecutive years of sales and concert attendance records from 1990 to 1995. Mario Tarradell of The Dallas Morning News wrote that the singles from Amor Prohibido elevated Selena to success on Latin radio whose promoters had not previously taken the singer seriously. By 1994, Tejano acts were effortless selling 100,000 units of their albums, while La Mafia and Selena were the two most commercially successful Tejano artists. Selena's music led the genre's 1990s revival and made it marketable for the first time. Tejano music is believed by Jose Behar to have hit Mexico "like an atomic bomb" by 1994. While Tejano singer Emilio Navaira decided on a crossover into American country music, preparations began for Selena's crossover into American pop music. The singer was fatally wounded after a confrontation with Yolanda Saldivar, a former friend and manager of the singer's fan club and boutiques. Her unfinished crossover album, Dreaming of You (1995), became the first mostly-Spanish album to debut and peak at number one on the US Billboard 200 chart. Tejano music suffered and its popularity waned following Selena's death, and record labels began abandoning their Tejano artists while radio stations in the United States switched from Tejano to Regional Mexican music.

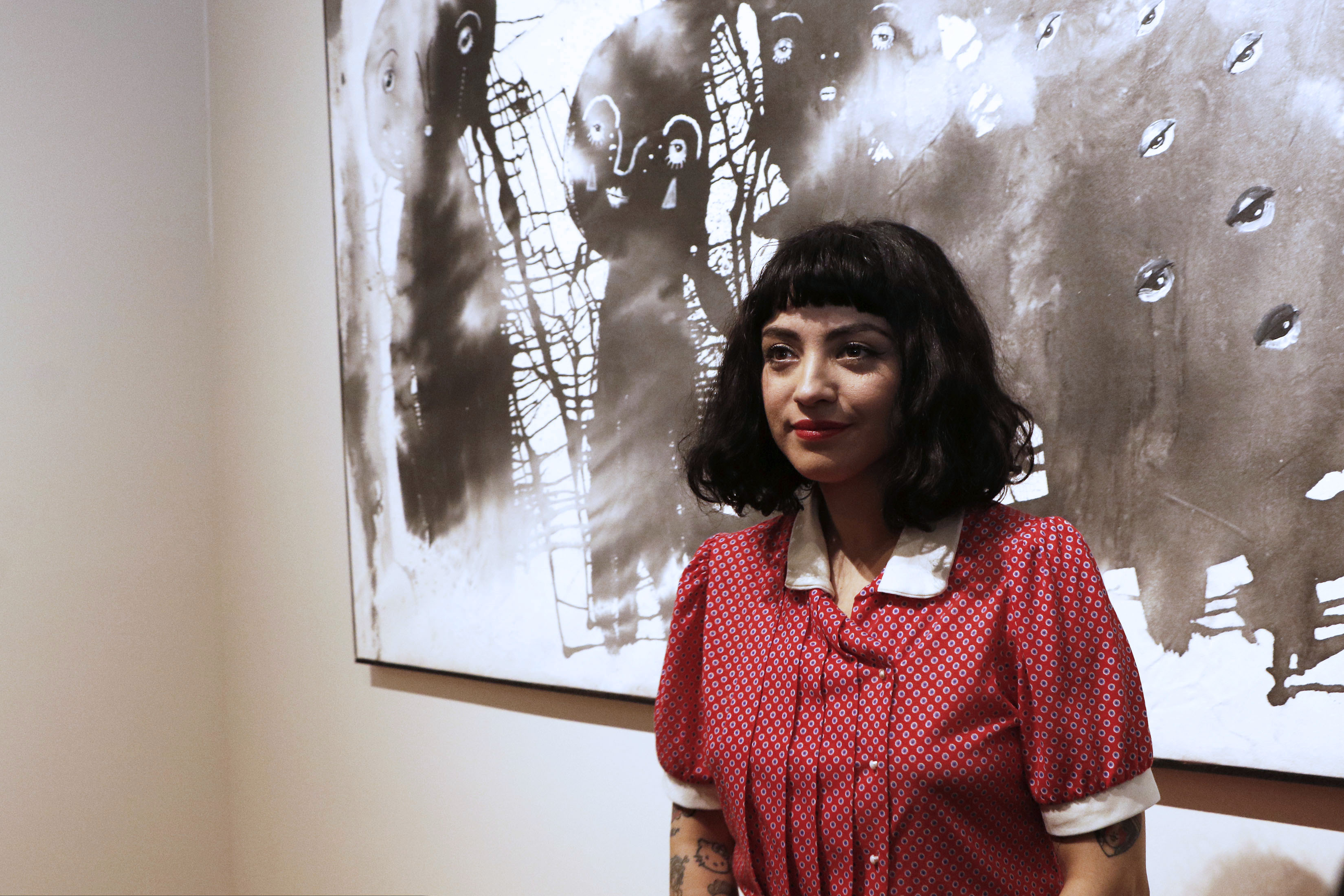
Mon Laferte at her solo exhibition in Mexico City

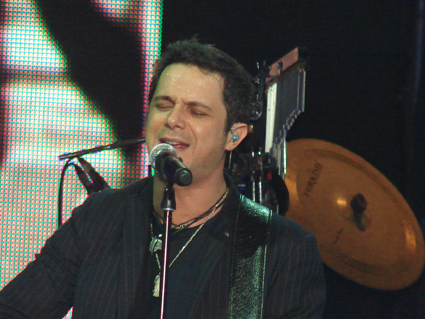
Alejandro Sanz has won 22 Latin Grammy Awards.

By the mid-1990s, Tejano music was replaced by Latin pop as the dominant Latin music genre in the United States. Gloria and her husband Emilio Estefan are considered to have "open[ed] the door" to a number of artists throughout the 1990s decade. Their production is believed to have provided Mexican singer Thalía with her first platinum award for En éxtasis (1995). Colombian pop rock singer Shakira released her international debut album Pies Descalzos (1995). She worked closely with the Estefans for her album Dónde Están Los Ladrones? (1998), which topped the US Billboard Top Latin Albums chart. The album's success and production by the Estefans, provided Shakira with a lucrative formula that she used for her English-language crossover which was released in 2001. Enrique Iglesias, the son of Spanish singer-songwriter Julio Iglesias, released two albums; his self-titled album released in 1995, and Vivir (1997), that concentrated on pop ballads and rhythms. With improvements in his songwriting on Vivir, Enrique was able to successfully convey "his innermost thoughts and feelings". Critics found Vivir to be superior to Enrique's contemporaries and reportedly sold over five million copies in Asia, Europe, and South and Central America within a week of its release, the first Latin album to do so. Ricky Martin's hip-shaking dance moves were compared to those of Elvis Presley among American music critics seeking to find an artist who resembled Martin's dance moves and their effect on the United States pop market. In 1998, music and ticket sales of Martin grossed $106 million, which was the equivalent of the total exports of Puerto Rico to Mexico in 1996. His 1998 album Vuelve contained "La Copa de la Vida", which became the official 1998 FIFA World Cup song. This provided Martin with worldwide visibility, though it was his performance of the recording at the 1999 Grammy Awards that brought Martin attention from American audiences. In 1999, he released his self-titled album which contained the English-language number-one song "Livin' la Vida Loca". Following the commercial and critical success of the film Selena (1997), Jennifer Lopez catapulted to fame in the title role. Lopez entered the music market following a string of films and released her debut recording On the 6 (1999), which she described as a Latin soul album.

Bolero music saw a resurgence of popularity with the younger audience. Mexican singer Luis Miguel was credited for the renewed interest with the success of his album, Romance (1991), a collection of classics covered by the artist. Around the same time, artists from Italy such as Eros Ramazzotti, Laura Pausini, and Nek successfully crossed over to the Latin music field by recording Spanish-language versions of their songs. In the tropical music field, merengue, which had gained attention in the 1980s, rivaled salsa in popularity.

=== 2000s ===
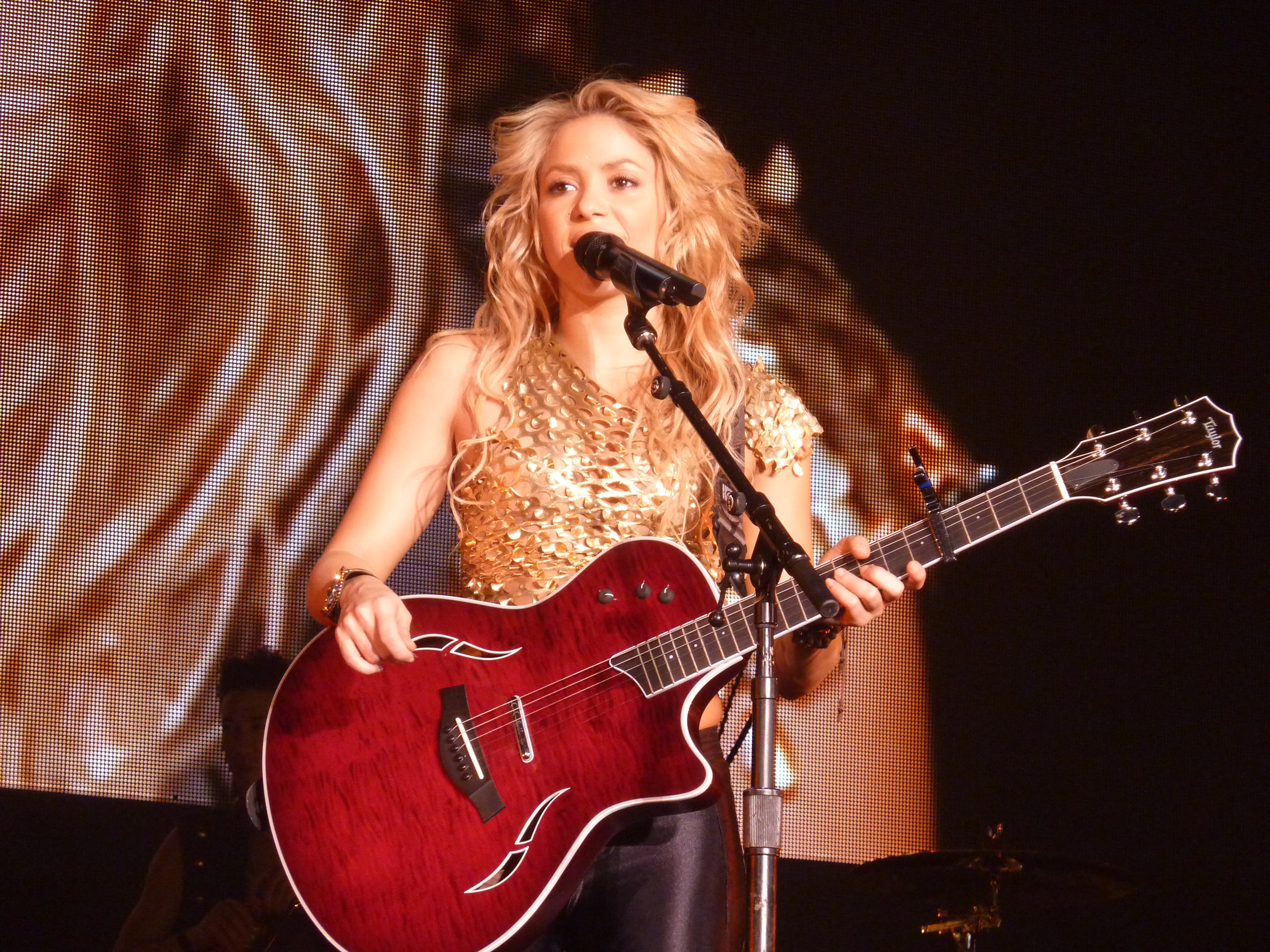
Shakira

In the mid-2000s, reggaeton became popular in the mainstream market, with Héctor el Father Tego Calderón, Daddy Yankee, Don Omar, and Wisin & Yandel considered to be the frontiers of the genre. In the tropical music scene, bachata music became popular in the field, with artists such as Monchy & Alexandra and Aventura finding success in the urban areas of Latin America. Banda was the dominant genre in the Regional Mexican music field.

=== 2010s ===
By the turn of the decade, the Latin music field was dominated by up-tempo rhythms, including electropop, reggaeton, urbano, banda and contemporary bachata music, as Latin ballads and crooners fell out of favor among U.S. Latin radio programmers. Streaming has become the dominant form of revenue in the Latin music industry in the United States, Latin America and Spain. Latin trap gained mainstream attention in the mid-2010s with artists such as Ozuna, Bad Bunny, and Anuel AA.

=== 2020s ===
Reggaeton continued to gain popularity throughout the world in the 2020s, led by musicians like Bad Bunny. His impact went beyond music and served as a catalyst for social change, especially in Puerto Rico. Bad Bunny made use of his enormous platform to draw attention to problems like the aftermath of Hurricane Maria. His song "El Apagón" brought attention to the island's ongoing power outages and financial difficulties while discussing Puerto Rico's energy provider, LUMA. In addition to elevating Latin music globally, reggaeton's dominance in the music industry has magnified the voices of social justice advocates.

== Regions ==
=== United States ===
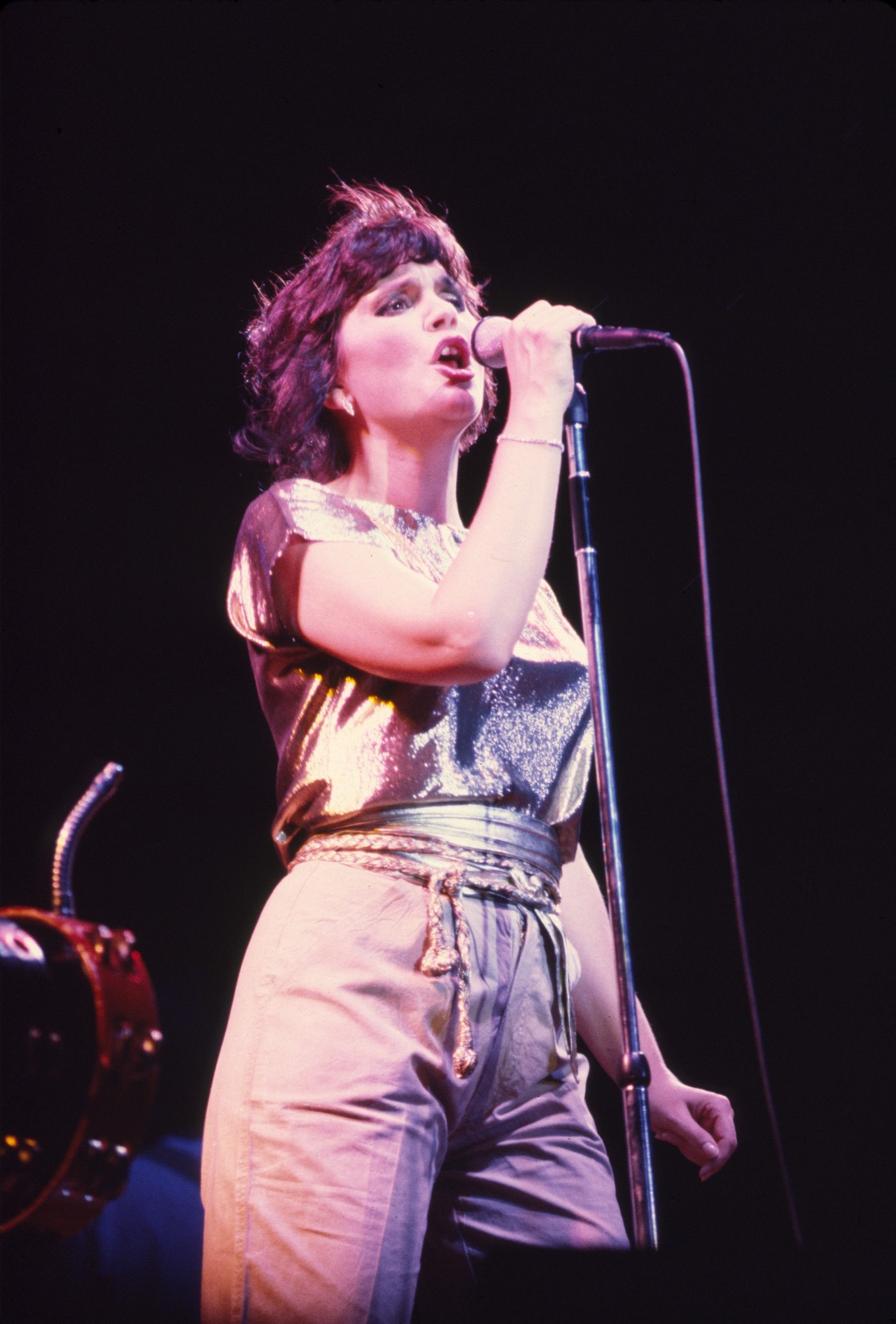
Linda Ronstadt at Six Flags Over Texas, August 1981.

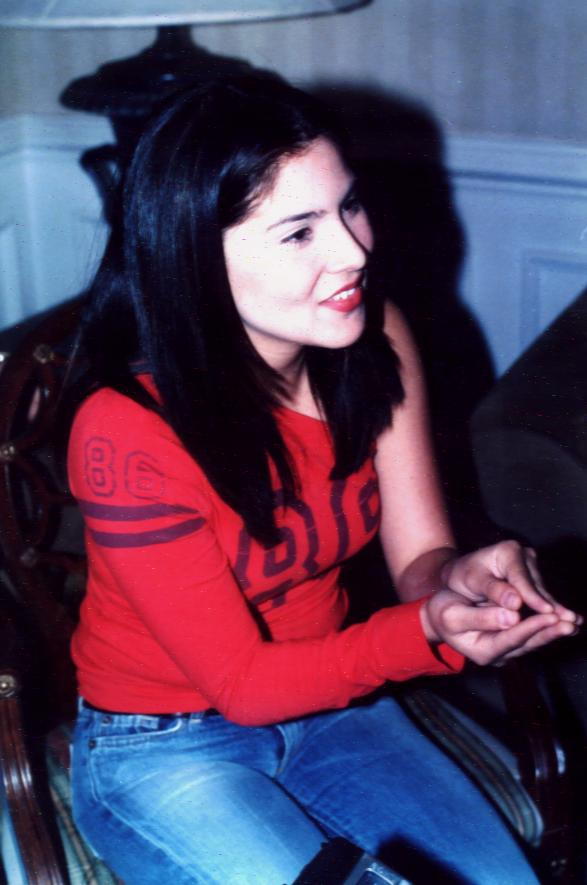
Jaci Velasquez

The origins of Latin Music in the United States dates back to the 1930s with Rhumba. Rhumba was prominent with Cuban-style ballroom dancing in the 1930s, but was not mainstream. It was not until the 1950s and 1960s that Latin Music started to become intertwined with American culture. Latin music is starting to become mainstream in the US as Latin artists are teaming up with English speaking artists. In 2017, a song named, "Despacito" by Justin Bieber, Luis Fonsi, and Daddy Yankee had 4.5 billion views on YouTube. In 2017, six of the top ten viewed songs on YouTube feature Latin Artists. The song was the beginning for the boom of Latin music in the United States. Some of the most popular forms of Latin music are Salsa, Bachata, Regional Mexican music, Tango, Merengue, Latin Pop, and Reggaeton. Today, reggaeton is a very popular style that combines reggae and American hip-hop. Some of the most popular artists today are Daddy Yankee, Melymel, J Balvin and Nicky Jam. In 2018, Latin music came second in total video streams with 21.8% market share. Latin music listeners tend to be younger, more tech savvy, 95% of Latin music coming from streaming suggests, according to Jeff Benjamin.

Immigration and globalization has caused Latin music to skyrocket in popularity. Historically, the United States and Britain have had control over the music industry but the internet and technology has allowed for diversification and local music to become more prominent throughout the world. The technological advancements have allowed streaming services to flourish that offer a wide variety of music without having to pay for each individual song/album. The increase in Latin artists working with English speaking American artists has caused songs such as Ritmo by An American band, The Black Eyed Peas, and J Balvin, a Latin singer, to be number one on the billboard's Hot Latin Songs chart. This increase has caused Latin music sales revenue in the US to rise from 176 million to 413 million dollars in 2018. From 2016 to 2017, the amount of Latin songs on the billboard hot 100 increased from four to 19. Latin music surpassed Country and EDM in terms of album sales in the US in 2018. This trend has caused pop music in the US to adopt certain styles from Latin music. This has some experts questioning whether less popular Latin genres will become more niche in the future as record labels focus on products in industries with a greater concentration of money.

== Miscategorization ==
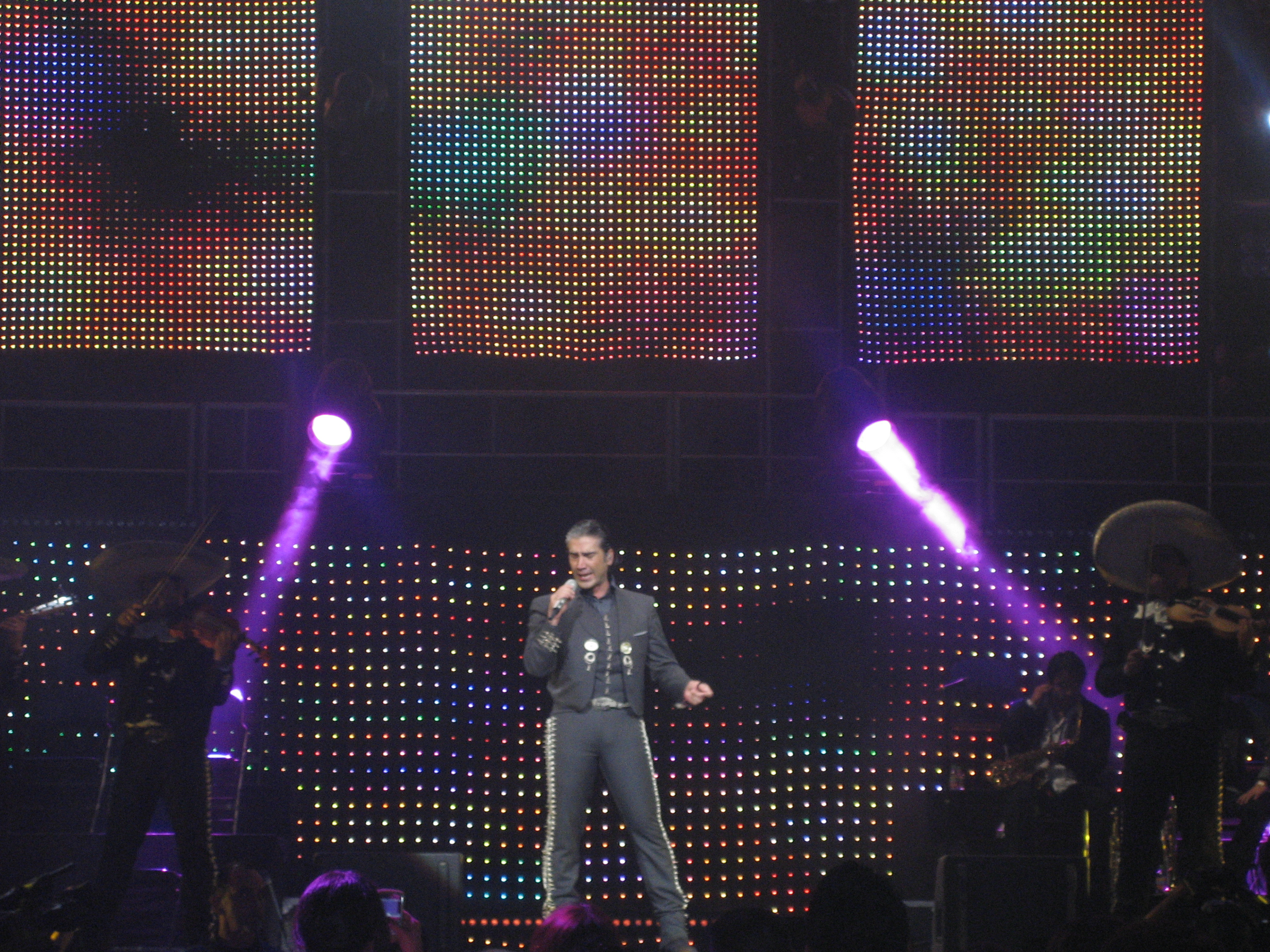
Mexican singer Alejandro Fernandez in concert.

Numerous computer science and music experts have reported a common error on streaming services such as Spotify. Overlooking mainstay artists in catch-all genre terms such as Latin music, potentially causing a categorical homogenization of musical styles; incorrectly miscategorizing musicians and songs from heritage styles, such as Norteño, New Mexico music, Duranguense, and Tejano music, leading to underperformance of these styles on their platforms. In addition, due to the fact that Spanish-language also includes music from Spain, artists from that country are labelled as "Latin". Following Rosalía's win for Best Latin Video for "Con Altura" at the 2019 MTV Video Music Awards, Rosalía broached a related discussion, as to whether the expression "Latin" (derived from a Romance language, like Spanish) has been misunderstood and has evolved to the English interpretation of "Latino" (person from Latin American countries previously ruled by the Spanish and Portuguese empires), extending the debate about cultural appropriation and whether she should or should not be nominated in Latin categories at award shows.

== See also ==
- Billboard Top Latin Albums
- Hot Latin Songs
- The Latin Recording Academy
- List of best-selling Latin albums
- List of best-selling Latin music artists
- List of best-selling Latin singles
- Category:Latin music by year

== Works cited ==
- Burr, Ramiro (January 5, 1991). "Mexican Quartet Captures Top OTI Prize" (PDF). Billboard. Archived from the original (PDF) on June 5, 2024.
- Burr, Ramiro (April 23, 1994). "Tejano". Billboard. Vol. 106, no. 17. pp. 30, 32, 34.
- Burr, Ramiro (1999). The Billboard Guide to Tejano and Regional Mexican Music. Billboard books. ISBN 0-8230-7691-1.
- Candelaria, Cordelia (2004b). Candelaria, Cordelia; García, Peter J.; Aldama, Arturo J. (eds.). Encyclopedia of Latino Popular Culture. Vol. 2. Westport, CT: Greenwood Press. ISBN 0-313-33211-8.
- Furman, Elina; Furman, Leah (2000). Enrique Iglesias. New York, NY: St. Martin's Publishing Group. ISBN 1466810394.
- Krohn, Katherine E. (2008). Shakira. Minneapolis: Twenty-First Century Books. ISBN 978-0822571599.
- Lannert, John (August 5, 1995). "Selena's Dreaming of You is Bittersweet Hit for Late EMI Star". Billboard. Vol. 107, no. 31. p. 1.
- Lannert, John; Burr, Ramiro (August 17, 1996). "Regional Mexican Music". Billboard. Vol. 108, no. 33. pp. 38–46.
- Lannert, John (June 21, 1997). "LARAS Formed To Expand Latin Work of NARAS". Billboard. Vol. 109, no. 25. pp. 6, 92–93.
- Maciel, David; Ortiz, Isidro D.; Herrera-Sobek, Mar'a (2000). Chicano renaissance : contemporary cultural trends. Tucson: University of Arizona Press. p. 330. ISBN 0816520216.
- Negrón-Muntaner, Frances (2004). Boricua Pop: Puerto Ricans and the Latinization of American Culture. NYU Press. p. 337. ISBN 978-0-8147-5878-6.
- Novas, Himilce (2007). Everything you need to know about Latino history (2008 ed.). New York: Plume. p. 432. ISBN 978-0452288898.
- Patoski, Joe Nick (1996). Selena: Como La Flor. Boston: Little Brown and Company. ISBN 0-316-69378-2.
- Patoski, Joe Nick (May 2000). "Tuned Out". Texas Monthly.
- Patoski, Joe Nick (March 23, 2020). "A Timeline of Tejano Music". Cowboys & Indians.
- Saldana, Hector (August 16, 2015). "Tejano music enjoyed a decade-long golden age". My San Antonio.
- San Miguel, Guadalupe (2002). Tejano Proud. Texas A&M University Press. p. 192. ISBN 1585441880.
- San Miguel, Guadalupe (2002a). "When Tejano Ruled The Airways: The Rise and Fall of KQQK in Houston, Texas". NACCS Annual Conference Proceedings (PDF). Vol. 13. Western Association of Schools and Colleges – via SJSU ScholarWorks.
- Schone, Mark (April 20, 1995). "A Postmortem Star in death, Selena is a crossover success". Newsday.
- Shaw, Lisa (2005). Pop Culture Latin America!: Media, Arts, and Lifestyle. ABC-CLIO. ISBN 1-85109-504-7.
- Tarradell, Mario (April 1, 1995). "Singer soared beyond traditional limits on Tejano music". The Dallas Morning News.
- Untiedt, Kenneth L. (2013). Cowboys, Cops, Killers, and Ghosts: Legends and Lore in Texas. University of North Texas Press. ISBN 978-1-57441-532-2.
