= Orquesta Hermanos Palau =

The Orquesta Hermanos Palau (Palau Brothers Orchestra) was one of the most renowned dance bands in Cuba during the early 1930s and late 1940s, following the tradition of local jazz bands started by the Jazz Band Sagua in 1914. These orchestras emerged as an influential sign of the American music in Cuba, to achieving a bridge between popular music genres and the characteristic sound of American jazz big bands.

The original orchestra, which was founded in 1920, was originally known as Los Califates, but at the end of the decade it changed its name to that of the Hermanos Palau. The decision was made because five of its musicians were all brothers. Manolo Palau was the pianist and leader, Felipe and Luis played trumpet, Rafael contrabass, and Raimundo served as saxophonist and co-leader.

In 1931, the Palau Brothers orchestra appeared in the early sound film The Cuban Love Song, which was directed by W. S. Van Dyke and starred Lawrence Tibbett, Lupe Vélez, Ernest Torrence and Jimmy Durante. This film brought to the screen for the first time the famous tune "The Peanut Vendor" (El Manisero), composed by Moisés Simons and performed by Ernesto Lecuona and the Palau Brothers' orchestra.

After that, the orchestra toured extensively in South America and played mostly in the all-white, up-scale venues. Their music ranged from jazz to popular, typical, and Afro-Cuban as well as classical. Among others there in the orchestra were the trumpeter Julio Cueva and the guarachero Cascarita (Orlando Guerra).

The Palau musical tradition passed from brother to brother, and from them through their own families via their children, so much that the end of the 1950s they were able to organize another orchestra, known as Hermanos Palau Junior, to maintain their family tradition alive.

== Selected soundtracks ==
- Acomodando
- Apriétame más
- La araña y la mosca
- Baltazar tiene un pollo
- Cómo se baila la suiza
- La conga de allá
- Dos cosas pa' tomá' con leche
- Mala maña
- La ola marina
- Perro huevero
- Pobrecitas mujeres
- Puntillita
- Rosas del pensil
- Sácale punta al lápiz
- Ta' bueno ya
- Tú verá' lo que tú va' ve
- Uampampiro
- Yo estoy aprendiendo inglés

== Sources ==
- The American Film Institute Catalog of Motion Pictures Produced in the United States: Feature Films, 1931-1940 – American Film Institute. Publisher: University of California Press, 1993. Language: English. ISBN 0-520-07908-6
- Cuba and its Music: from the first drums to the mambo – Ned Sublette. Publisher: Chicago Review Press, Inc., first edition, 2004. Language: English. ISBN 1-55652-632-6
- Diccionario de la música cubana: biográfico y técnico – Helio Orovio. Publisher: Ed. Letras Cubanas, second edition, 1992. Language: Spanish. ISBN 959-10-0048-0, ISBN 978-959-10-0048-4
- Los contrapuntos de la música cubana – Cristóbal Díaz Ayala. Publisher: Ediciones Callejón, 2006. Language: Spanish. ISBN 1-881748-48-0
- Música cubana del areyto a la nueva trova – Cristóbal Díaz Ayala. Publisher: Ediciones Universal, 1981. Language: Spanish.
