= Pregón =

Song based on a street-seller's cry

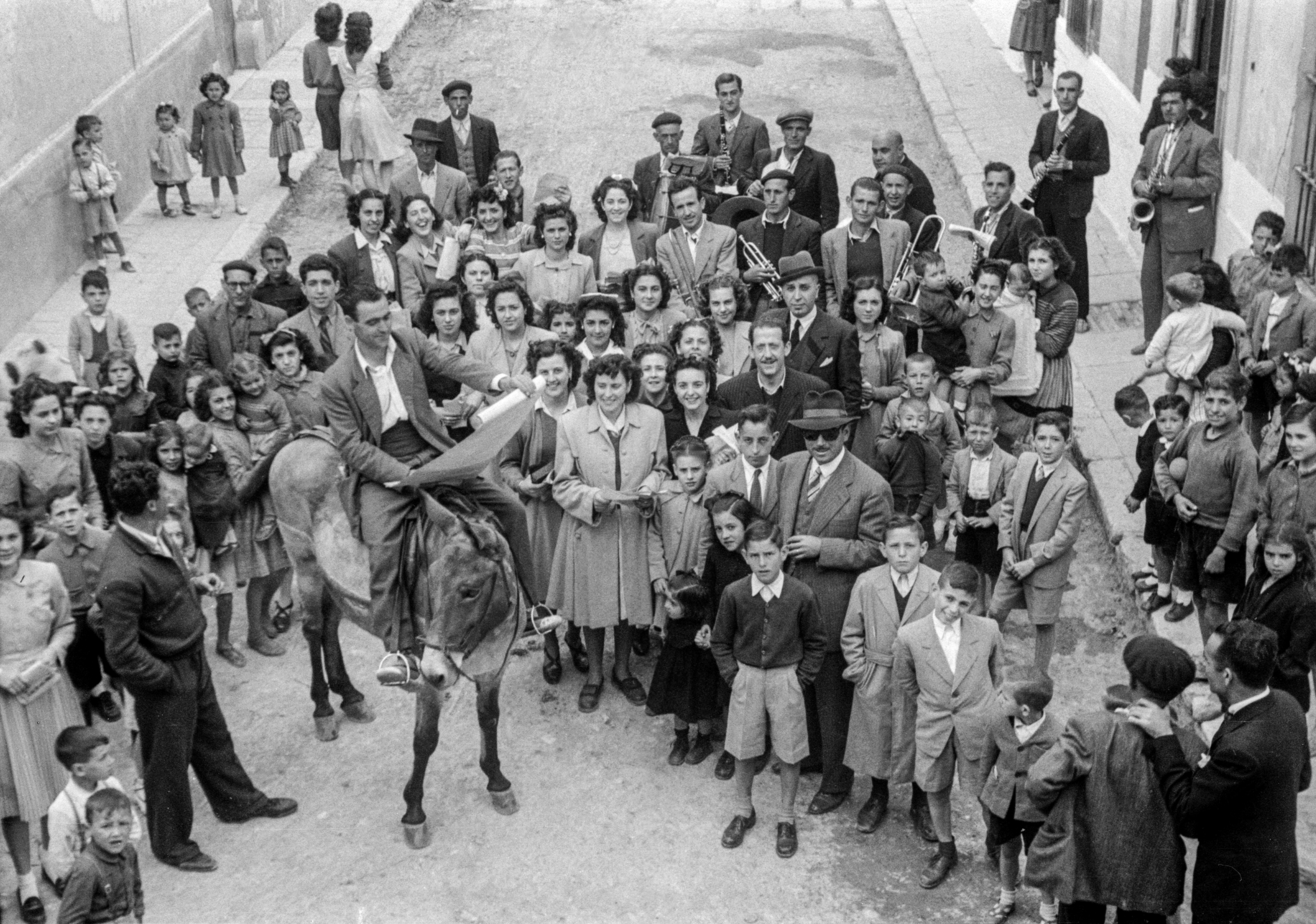
Festivities in 1948

Pregón, a Spanish word meaning announcement or street-seller's cry, has a particular meaning in both Cuban music and Latin American music in general. It can be translated as a song based on a street-seller's cry or a street-seller's song ("canto de los vendedores ambulantes").

== Background ==
Oral proclamations made in the street were an important form of mass communication throughout Europe and the Americas until the late 19th century, when other forms of communication emerged to replace the town criers. In Spain and Latin-America, those who read these proclamations were known as pregoneros and their speech as a pregón.

Over time, the official town crier, who read public announcements sanctioned by governments, disappeared, but the street cries associated with itinerant vendors continued into the 20th century, and can still be heard in commercial marketplaces and fairs. Street vendors and their cries were known in medieval Europe. The numbers of street vendors working in urban areas increased markedly from the 17th century. These criers or street vendors filled the streets of many European cities including Paris, Bologna, Naples and Cologne. As the streets filled with hawkers, costermongers and other types of the itinerant vendor, competition between them intensified. In an effort to stand out, street vendors began to develop distinctive, melodic cries, which became a standard feature of street life. Each trade developed its own unique type of street cry; a distinctive set of words or a unique tune.

== Description ==
The use of street cries as a basis for song is particularly notable in South America and the Caribbean, where the crier is known as a pregonero. In Spain, the pregón may include flamenco or gyspy-inspired rhythms while in Latin-American pregón is noted for its incorporation of African rhythms such as bolero, clave, habanera and rumba. For example, the traditional pregón from Havana "Castillo mangüé" is often played as a yambú, a type of rumba.

In Cuba, ethnologist Miguel Barnet noted that cross-fertilization was common as hawkers also often based their pregones on rural tunes or popular genres such as son and guaracha. The Cuban music historian Cristóbal Díaz Ayala has compiled a list of nearly five hundred examples of popular tunes based on hawker songs ‒ most from Cuba, but also from other Latin American countries such as Mexico, Chile, Colombia, Panama, Venezuela, Peru, Argentina, the Dominican Republic, and Puerto Rico.

One of the best-known examples of a pregón is the song entitled El Manisero ("The Peanut Vendor" in English) which was written by Cuban musician and composer Moisés Simons and first recorded by Rita Montaner in 1928. The 1930 version recorded by Don Azpiazú in New York City with Antonio Machín on vocals became a worldwide hit starting a rhumba craze that swept throughout North America and much of Europe in the 1930s. The Peanut Vendor had a second life as a hit piece when Stan Kenton recorded it as an instrumental in 1947. The song, Yes! We Have No Bananas first published in 1923, was inspired by the idiom of a Long Island fruitseller.

Other well-known pregones and their writers include the following:

- Frutas del Caney ("Fruits from El Caney") by Félix B. Cagnet – Cuba
- El yerberito ("The herb vendor") by Benny Moré – Cuba
- Rica pulpa by Eliseo Grenet – Cuba
- El afilador ("The knife grinder") by Agustín Magaldi – Argentina
- El botellero ("The bottle-man") by Gilberto Valdés – Cuba
- El carbonero ("The charcoal seller") by Iván Fernandez – Cuba)
- El frutero ("The fruit vendor") by Cruz Felipe Iriarte – Venezuela
- El limpiabotas ("The shoeshine boy") by Los Cuates Castilla – Mexico
- El pregón de las flores ("The flower seller's cry") by Ernesto Lecuona – Cuba
- La violetera ("The girl who sells violets") by Eduardo Montesinos López, 1958 – Spain
- Naranjas de Valencia ("Valencia oranges") by María Luisa Escobar – Venezuela
- Se va el dulcerito ("The sweet seller is leaving") by Rosendo Ruiz – Cuba
- Claveles de Galipán ("Carnations of Galipan") by Francisco de Paula Aguirre – Venezuela
- El mielero ("The honey vendor") by Billo Frómeta – Dominican Republic
- El aguacate guarenero ("The guarenero avocado") by Benito Canónico – Venezuela
- El tamalito ("The corn pastry") by Andrés Soto – Peru
- El pastelero ("The pastry seller") by Guaco – Venezuela
- Yo vendo unos ojos negros ("Some black eyed (peas) for sale") – Chile (pre-1910, unknown composer; arranged by Pablo Ara Lucena)
- El mercado de Los Buchones ("Los Buchones market") by Astolfo Romero - Venezuela
- Pregones zulianos ("Zulians pregons") by Rafael Rincón González - Venezuela

== See also ==
- Costermonger
- Peddler
- Street cries
- Street vendor
- Street market
