= Canonico =

Canonico or Canónico is a surname. Notable people with the surname include:

- Benito Canónico (1894–1971), Venezuelan composer, musician, orchestrator, and teacher
- Daniel Canónico (1916–1975), Venezuelan baseball player
- Gerard Canonico (born 1989), American actor and singer
