= Antonio Machín =

Spanish-Cuban singer and musician (1903–1977)

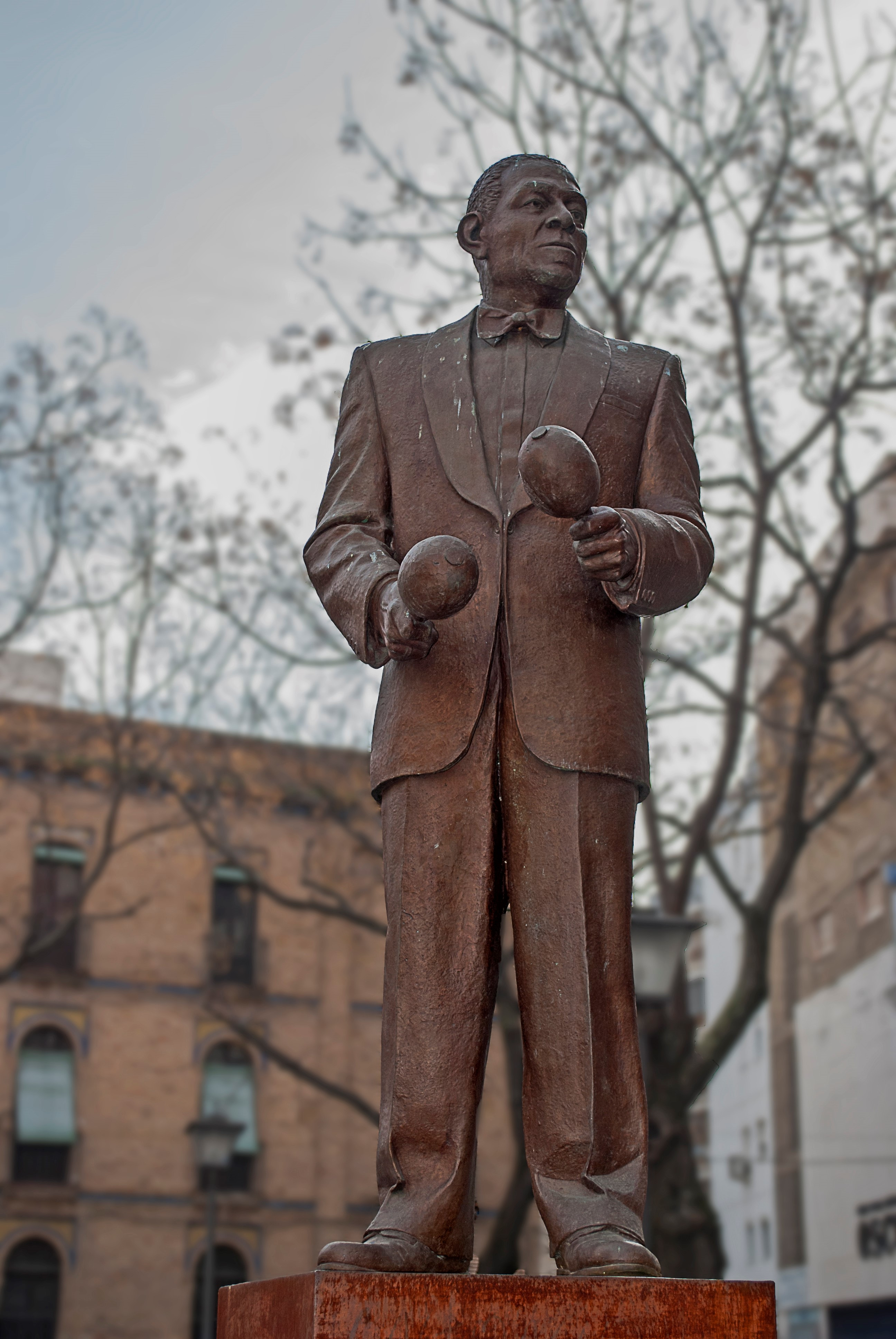
- Born: Antonio Abad Lugo Machín; February 11, 1903; Sagua la Grande, Cuba
- Died: August 4, 1977 (aged 74); Madrid, Spain
- Resting place: Cemetery of San Fernando, Seville, Spain
- Spouse: María de los Ángeles Rodríguez (m. 1943)
- Children: 1

Antonio Abad Lugo Machín (11 February 1903 – 4 August 1977) was a Spanish-Cuban singer and musician. His version of El Manisero, recorded in New York, 1930, with Don Azpiazú's orchestra, was the first million record seller for a Cuban artist. Although this was labelled a rhumba, it was in reality a son pregón, namely, a song based on a street-seller's cry.

== Biography ==
Machín was born on 11 February 1903 in Sagua la Grande, Cuba. He was a mixed-race son of a Cuban woman, Leoncia Machín, and a Spanish father, José Lugo Padrón, who emigrated to Cuba from Galicia, Spain. Machín was one of sixteen children. His early years were difficult: he was forced to work at the age of eight to help pay some of his father's numerous debts. One day, he was in the street by his house singing quietly. A priest that walked by heard him and immediately encouraged him to sing at a party. He sang Ave María by Schubert. From that day on Machín was determined to become a singer. Machín's ambition was to sing opera, but at the beginning of the 20th century this was difficult for a poor colored Cuban. Thus, he focused on singing popular music. At the age of twenty he had become the idol of the young women in his neighbourhood. Machín would sing them serenades in the moonlight. He worked as a mason, also travelling across Cuba as a singer. In 1926 he moved to Havana where he met a Spaniard who helped him get a contract to sing at a small café in Havana.

In Havana, Machín was exposed to many genres of music. He joined several trios, quartets and sextets. In 1924 Machín formed a duo with the trovador Miguel Zaballa. Later he joined the Trío Luna, with Enrique Peláez and Manuel Luna. In 1926 he was brought into Don Azpiazú's orchestra, the house band at the Havana Casino. In 1930 he went to New York with Don Azpiazú's band, where El manisero (The Peanut Vendor, written by Moisés Simons) was recorded. It became the first Cuban song to become a hit in the U.S., presaging the rhumba craze of the 1930s. Machín did not return to Cuba after this tour, settling in New York City for the time.

In New York, Machín recorded approximately 200 numbers, and formed the Cuarteto Machín in 1932. The other members were the Puerto Ricans Plácido Acevedo (trumpet), Cándido Vicenty (tres) and Daniel Sánchez (second voice and guitar). Machín himself was first voice. Various other musicians substituted as needed, and eventually this became the Sexteto Machín, with the great Cuban trumpeter Remberto Lara, for whom Mario Bauzá substituted on some recordings. Machín sang with other groups such as José Escarpenter y su Orquesta, Orquesta Antillana de Rafael Hernández, Julio Roque y su Orquesta, and Armando Valldespí y su Orquesta, in addition to performing with Orquesta Machín and Cuarteto Machín.

In 1935 he moved to Europe, living in London and Paris before settling in Madrid in the late 1930s, where he would remain until his death. In Paris, he formed Antonio Machín y su Orquesta, with Simons on piano, and continued to record in the city (where Cuban music had been popular since the late twenties). After moving to Madrid he married María de los Ángeles Rodríguez, from Seville, in 1943. As the Cuarteto Machín, he made over 60 recordings in Spain, often recording the works of composers Oswaldo Farrés and Consuelo Velázquez. He also had an extensive recording career singing with various Spanish bands; the total of recordings in Europe may be as many as four hundred, giving him a lifetime total of about 600 numbers recorded. If that is approximately right, he would be one of the most recorded Cuban singers of the 20th century, but behind Celia Cruz.

He died in Madrid in 1977 and was buried in the San Fernando Cemetery in the city of Seville. He is best known for singing El Manisero, Dos gardenias, Madrecita, and Angelitos negros.
