= Castillo mangüé =

Traditional Cuban pregón (street cry)

"Castillo mangüé", also known as "Chévere mangüé", is a traditional Cuban pregón (street cry) often played as a yambú, son or guaracha. According to Helio Orovio, it is an example of an orally transmitted yambú still performed today.

== Recordings ==
The song has an unknown author but has been recorded numerous times with different titles by multiple artists. It was registered as a son-pregón under the title "Chévere mangüé" by Felipe Neri Cabrera in 1932, although the Septeto Habanero did not record it. One of the most famous versions was made by Machito in New York in 1948 ("Chévere"), a guaracha later released as a single by Verne. Senegalese singer Fonseca recorded it at the end of "A guarachar" in the mid-1960s. Arsenio Rodríguez recorded it as part of the yambú medley "Esto es yambú" (credited to his brother Israel "Kike" Travieso Scull) for his 1968 album Arsenio dice. Carlos "Patato" Valdés recorded it as a rumba ("Chévere") for his 1976 album Authority. This version was credited to Papaíto, the lead singer. Carlos Embale sang it at the end his 1986 recording of "El callejón de los rumberos".

The song is often interpolated at the end of "Mondongo", a guaguancó composed by Agustín Pina "Flor de Amor". Recordings of this version have been made by the Conjunto de Percusión de Danza Nacional de Cuba featuring Inés Carbonell on their 1987 Homenaje a Jesús Pérez and by Jane Bunnett on her 1997 album Chamalongo. Another version was recorded in 1998 by Deep Rumba under the title "Yambú chevrolet", which was credited to Orlando "Puntilla" Ríos. Chavalonga recorded the song as part of a yambú medley entitled "La bullanguera" for this 2004 album En el barrio de Ataré.
