= Cascarita =

Cuban singer

Background information
- Birth name: Orlando Guerra
- Born: September 14, 1920; Camagüey, Cuba
- Died: March 20, 1973 (aged 52); Mexico City, Mexico
- Genres: son montuno, guaracha, mambo, guaguancó
- Occupation: Singer
- Years active: 1942–1973
- Labels: RCA Victor, Orfeón Records
- Formerly of: Hermanos Palau, Julio Cueva, Orquesta Casino de la Playa, Orestes Santos, Memo Salamanca

Orlando Guerra (gayr'-rah; September 14, 1920 – March 20, 1973), better known as Cascarita, was a popular Cuban singer who specialized in guaracha and son montuno. He became one of Cuba's most famous vocalists as a member of Julio Cueva's big band and Orquesta Casino de la Playa in the 1940s.

== Life and career ==
=== Early life and career ===
Guerra was born on September 14, 1920, in Camagüey, the third-largest city of Cuba and the capital of Camagüey Province. Guerra started his professional career in his native Camagüey and Havana in the early 1940s, and made his name singing in highly successful big bands. In 1942 he joined Hermanos Palau. The same year he recorded with Pepito Torres' Orquesta Siboney in Puerto Rico, and in 1943 he and several other members of the Palau, spearheaded by Julio Cueva, founded a new big band with the arrangements of pianist René Hernández. After the departure of Miguelito Valdés, the lead singer of Orquesta Casino de la Playa, to New York in 1940, Cascarita became the main big band vocalist in Cuba. In Cueva's band, he was accompanied on vocals by René Márquez and Manuel "Puntillita" Licea. The owner of a highly personal style of vocalizing, he had an interesting sense of ease and graceful fluency to improvise, particularly interpreting guarachas, which gained him an important place in Cuban popular music history. He also became popular for his extravagant costumes and tangled sayings.

=== Casino de la Playa ===
Cascarita continued to work with Julio Cueva until 1946, when he joined Orquesta Casino de la Playa. It was through his personal recommendation that Dámaso Pérez Prado obtained the job of arranger-pianist of the orchestra. Pérez Prado had been blacklisted in Cuba from working as an arranger because his charts were "too out there". He had gone about as far as he could working for Casino de la Playa, as Cascarita was more popular than the band. The records no longer came out under the title "Casino de la Playa, featuring Cascarita", but "Cascarita accompanied by Casino de la Playa".

Guerra recorded dozens of songs. Some of his greatest hits were "El baile del sillón", "El caballo y la montura", "Estoy acabando", "Llora timbero", "La ola marina", "La pelotica", "Piru, piru, pirulí", "Se murió Panchita", "Ta' bueno ya", "La última noche" and "Uampampiro", among others. In 1968 Orfeón Records of Mexico released and LP of his work, Cascarita Con La Orquesta De Memo Salamanca.

=== Later years and death ===
With the advent of young successful singers such as Benny Moré, Cascarita lost much of his popularity, so he relocated to Mexico. There he joined pianist Memo Salamanca's orchestra. He died on March 20, 1973, in Mexico City at the age of 55. There are nonetheless conflicting accounts on his death. According to Juan José Reinosa he died in Panama, while Helio Orovio maintains that he died in Mexico in 1975. In August 2008, Mexican writer Arturo Yáñez stated that he died in 1971 and that his remains can be found at the Panteón San Lorenzo in Tlaxcolco, Mexico.

== Selected recordings ==
- Casino de la Playa (Tumbao Cuban Classics, CD, 1994)
  - Azúcar pa'un amargao'
  - El baile del sillón
  - El caballo y la montura
  - Coge pa'la cola
  - Esto es lo último
  - Estoy acabando
  - Llora
  - La pelotica
  - Quiero un sombrero
  - Se murió Panchita
  - Son los bobitos
  - Tártara
  - La última noche
  - Un meneíto na'ma
  - Yo pico un pan
- Julio Cueva (Tumbao Cuban Classics, CD, 1990)
  - La butuba cubana
  - Camisa sin botones
  - Cerebro como plancha
  - Con la comida no se juega
  - El cuento del sapo
  - Desintegrando
  - El golpecito
  - Figurina del solar
  - No tengo tambó'
  - Ñéngere ñéngue
  - Pasito pa'lante
  - Pin pin
  - Piru, piru, pirulí
  - La rareza del siglo
  - Sabanimar
  - Sacando boniato
  - En tiempo de mangos
- Hermanos Palau
  - Acomodando
  - Apriétame más
  - La ola marina
  - Mala maña
  - Perro huevero
  - Puntillita
  - Rosas del pensil
  - Sácale punta al lápiz
  - Ta' bueno ya
  - Tú verá' lo que tú va' ve
  - Uampampiro
  - Yo estoy aprendiendo inglés
- Pepito Torres
  - Ladrón de gallinas
  - Llora timbero
  - Un brujo en Guanabacoa
