= Julio Cueva =

Cuban trumpeter, composer and band leader (1897–1975)

Julio Cueva (Trinidad, Cuba, 12 April 1897 – Havana, 25 December 1975) was a Cuban trumpeter, composer and band leader. He was an important figure in the spread of Cuban popular music in the 1930s.

== Life and career ==
Cueva played cornet in the local children's band at ten, and soon composed a number of danzones. In 1916 he became the clarinetist of the Santa Clara municipal band. He joined Arquimedes Pous' theatre company, which toured the island regularly. In 1923 he founded and directed the municipal band of Trinidad. In 1929 he moved to Havana and played with Moises Simons and also with the Hermanos Palau orchestra.

Cueva's big break came when Don Azpiazú formed a band to tour Europe after the success of the Peanut Vendor. After the band returned, Cueva stayed in Europe for ten years as a trumpeter and band leader. He signed a contract with a Parisian nightclub, which promptly renamed itself La Cueva. Sublette says that it was in this club that Cueva and Eliseo Grenet launched the conga as a salon dance. However, the Lecuona Cuban Boys were playing it at the same time.

He was in Madrid when the Spanish Civil War started, and promptly joined the Republican side. He directed the 4th division's band on the battlefield. When the republicans were defeated, he left for Paris but was intercepted and briefly imprisoned.

Cueva returned to Cuba in 1940 and founded his own band, which became popular and performed on radio CMHI (later Cadena Azul, later still RHC-Cadena Azul) as Orquesta Montecarlo. This was a top-class outfit with several young members who later became famous, such as trumpeter Remberto Lara, with Tito Gómez and Cascarita (Orlando Guerra) on vocals. Cueva finally left the band and rejoined the Hermanos Palau orchestra, where he met the young pianist-arranger René Hernández.
