= Plaza Municipality =

Plaza Municipality Municipio Plaza
- Municipality
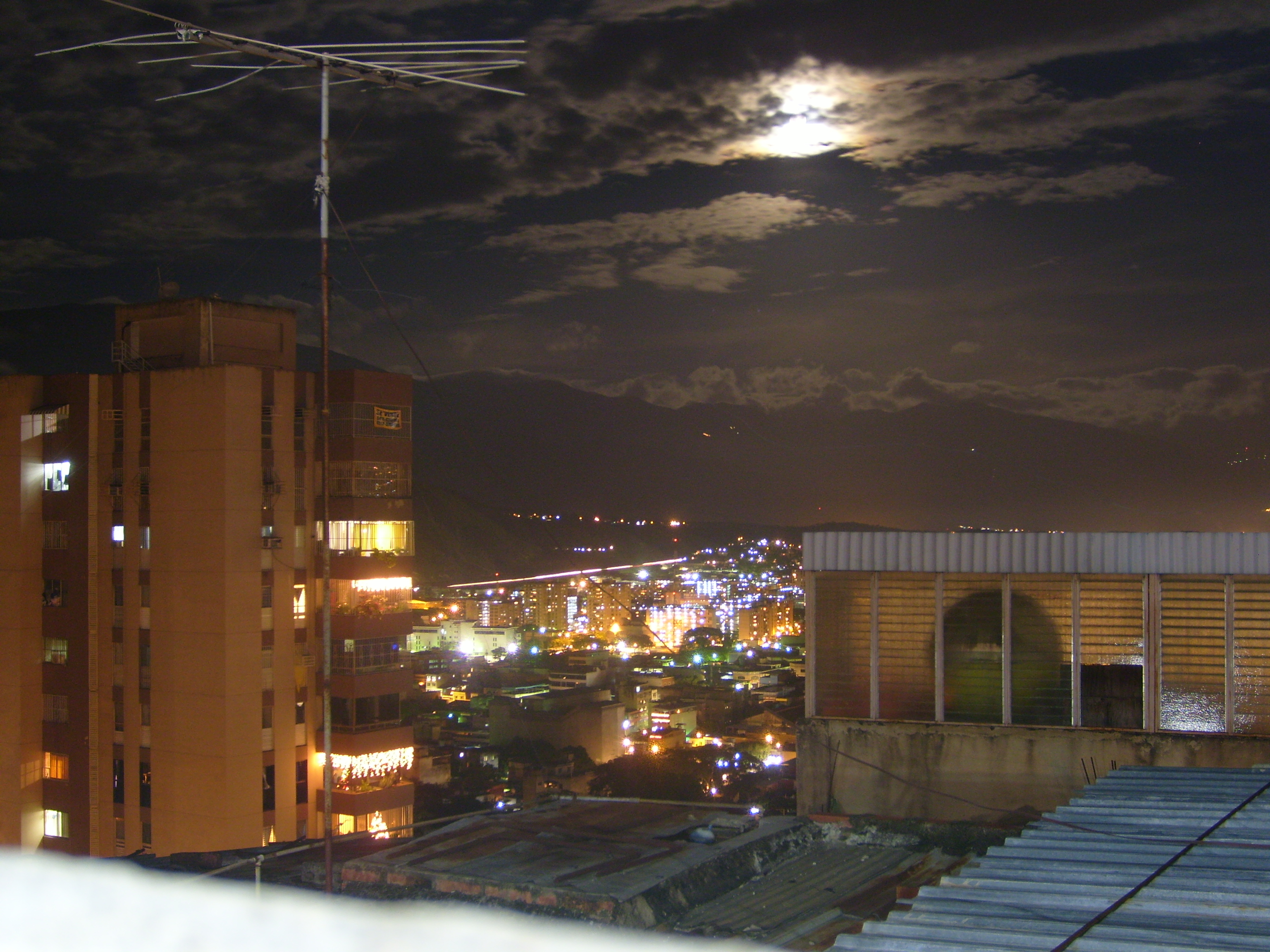
- View of Guarenas

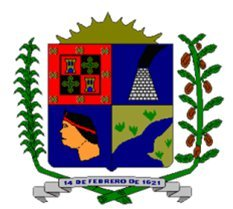
- Coat of arms

- Location in Venezuela
- Coordinates: 10°28′04″N 66°37′42″W
- Country: Venezuela
- State: Miranda
- Municipal seat: Guarenas

Government
  - Mayor: Antonio Galíndez Vallester (PSUV)

Area
  - Total: 171.5 km^{2} (66.2 sq mi)

Population (2013)
  - Total: 238,750
  - Density: 1,392/km^{2} (3,606/sq mi)
- Time zone: UTC−4 (VET)
- Area code(s): 0212
- Website: Official website

Plaza is one of the 21 municipalities (municipios) that makes up the Venezuelan state of Miranda and, according to a 2016 population estimate by the National Institute of Statistics of Venezuela, the municipality has a population of 238,750. The city of Guarenas is the administrative centre of the Plaza Municipality.

== History ==
The city of Guarenas was established in 1621 as Nuestra Señora de Copacabana de los Guarenas. Today, Guarenas has virtually merged with its neighbor, Guatire.

The Curupao Power Plant, which was inaugurated in 1933, still provides electricity to Guarenas and Guatire.

== Demographics ==
The Plaza Municipality, according to a 2016 population estimate by the National Institute of Statistics of Venezuela, has a population of 238,750 (up from 203,590 in 2000). This amounts to 8.3% of the state's population. The municipality's population density is 1,318.77 inhabitants per square kilometre (3,415.6/sq mi).

== Government ==
The mayor of the Plaza Municipality is Willian Eduardo Páez Sosa, re-elected on October 31, 2004, with 41% of the vote. The municipality is divided into one parish (Guarenas).
