= Moisés Simons =

Cuban composer, pianist, and orchestra leader (1889–1945)

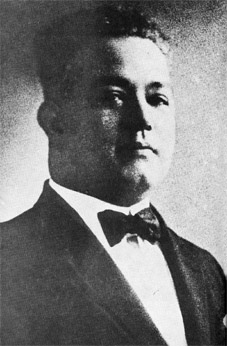
Moisés Simons

Moisés Simons (born Moisés Simón Rodríguez; 24 August 1889 in Havana, Cuba – 28 June 1945 in Madrid, Spain), was a leading Cuban composer, pianist, and orchestra leader. He was the composer of El Manisero (The Peanut Vendor in English) which is considered by many to be the most famous piece of music created by a Cuban musician and has since been recorded by other musicians from around the world hundreds of times.

== Biography ==
=== Early years ===
Moisés Simons was born on 24 August 1889 in Havana, Cuba. The son of a Basque musician, he started studying music with his father, Leandro Simón Guergué. By the age of 9, he was the organist at his local church in the barrio of Jesús María and choirmaster of the Pilar church. At 15, he undertook advanced studies under various maestros in composition, harmony, counterpoint, fugue, and instrumentation.

=== Career ===
Later, Simons became a concert pianist and musical director of lyric theater companies. He worked at the Teatro Martí, where musical comedies by Ernesto Lecuona were performed. He then moved to the Teatro Payret under contract to the Spanish composer, Vicente Lleó, who directed a zarzuela company with whom he toured throughout Latin American including Mexico, the Dominican Republic, Puerto Rico, and Central America.

In 1924, Simons founded a jazz band which played on the roof garden of the Plaza Hotel in Havana. It consisted of piano, violin, alto and tenor saxophones, flute, banjo, double bass, drums, and timbales. With Simons on piano, other members included Virgilio Diego on violin, Alberto Socarrás on alto sax and flute, José Ramón Betancourt on tenor sax, and Pablo O'Farrill on double bass. In 1928 while still at the same venue, Simons hired the famous trumpeter, Julio Cueva, as well as vocalist and drummer, Enrique Santiesteban. These were top instrumentalists at the time and were garnered fees of $8 a day.

Simons did research into the history of Cuban music publishing his articles in newspapers and magazines. He wrote the scores for stage shows and even several films. He was president of the Association of Musical Solidarity and the technical director of the Society of Wind Orchestras.

Simons was renowned as a composer during the era of afrocubanismo, the time between World War I and World War II when the contributions of Afro-Cubans to Cuban culture were finally gaining recognition. Other celebrated composers during this Afro-Cuban awakening were Alejandro García Caturla, Amadeo Roldán, Ernesto Lecuona, Eliseo Grenet, Gonzalo Roig, Rodrigo Prats, and Jorge Anckermann.

=== Later years ===
For much of the 1930s, Simons lived and worked in France, mostly in Paris, and was still there when World War II broke out. He was finally able to return to Cuba in 1942. He then moved to the Spanish Canary Island of Tenerife and later to Madrid, Spain where he signed a contract to provide music for the film, Bambú, which included his last known composition, Hoy Como Ayer (Today Like Yesterday in English).

Moisés Simons died in Madrid, Spain, on 28 June 1945. He was 55.

== El Manisero ==
The fame of El Manisero (The Peanut Vendor) led to Simons' own worldwide recognition. It sold over a million copies of sheet music for E.B. Marks Inc., and this netted $100,000 in royalties for Simons by 1943. Its success led to a 'rumba craze' in the US and Europe which lasted until the 1940s. The consequences of the Peanut Vendor's success was thus quite far-reaching.

The number was first recorded and released by singer Rita Montaner in either 1927 or 1928 on Columbia Records. The biggest hit for El Manisero came from the 1930 recording released by Don Azpiazú and his Havana Casino Orchestra in New York City on Victor Records. The band included a number of star musicians such as Julio Cueva (trumpet) and Mario Bauza (saxophone); Antonio Machín was the singer. There seems to be no authoritative account of the number of 78 rpm records of this recording sold by Victor; but it seems likely that the number would have exceeded the sheet music sales, making it the first million-selling record of Cuban (or even Latin) music.

The lyrics were based on a street vendors' cry, a pregón; and the rhythm was a son, so technically this was a son-pregón. On the record label, however, it was called a rhumba, not only the wrong genre, but misspelled as well. On the published score both music and lyrics are attributed to Simons, though there is a persistent story that they were written by Gonzalo G. de Mello in Havana the night before Montaner was due to record it in New York. Cristóbal Díaz says "For various reasons, we have doubts about this version... El Manisero was one of those rare cases in popular music where an author got immediate and substantial financial benefits... logically Mello would have tried to reclaim his authorship of the lyrics, but that did not occur." The second attack on the authorship of the lyrics came from none other than the great Fernando Ortíz. For Ortíz, the true author was an unknown Havana peanut seller, of the second half of the 19th century, who served as the basis for a danza written by Gottschalk. Of course, it may well be that elements of the song were to be found in real life. The English version is by Gilbert and Sunshine; the latter was Azpizú's sister-in-law, who toured with the band in the US as singer. According to Sublette, the English lyrics are of almost unsurpassed banality.

In 1947, The Peanut Vendor had a second life as a hit number when Stan Kenton and his big band recorded and released it on Capitol Records. It was such a popular hit for Kenton that he would go on to rerecord it for a second time.

Several films included versions of El Manisero. It appeared in the MGM movie, The Cuban Love Song, with Ernesto Lecuona as musical advisor, and sung by Lupe Velez and Lawrence Tibbett; Judy Garland sang a fragment of the song in the 1954 film, A Star is Born.

== Other works ==
Simons' musical compositions include lyric theater scores for the following operettas or zarzuelas: Deuda De Amor, La Negra Quirina, Le Chant Des Tropiques, Niña Mercé, and Toi, c'est Moi ‒ several of which were premiered in Paris during the 1930s.

Toi, c'est Moi, the operetta co-written with popular French novelist, Henri Duvernois, and starring Simone Simon, opened at the Théâtre des Bouffes-Parisiens in Paris in September 1934. The work consisted of a series of extremely varied numbers punctuated by humorous comedy scenes. The Cuban-born musicologist, Alejo Carpentier, praised Simons' excellent musical and technical accomplishment saying that Toi C'est Moi was by far the peak of Simons' creative career.

Noted compositions written by Simons include the following: Cubanacan, Los Tres Golpes, Así Es Mi Patria, Chivo Que Rompe Tambó, La Trompetilla, Paso Ñáñigo, Serenata Cubana, Vacúnala, Marta, Hoy Como Ayer, Danzas Cubanas, and Rumba Guajira.
