= Guarenas =

- City
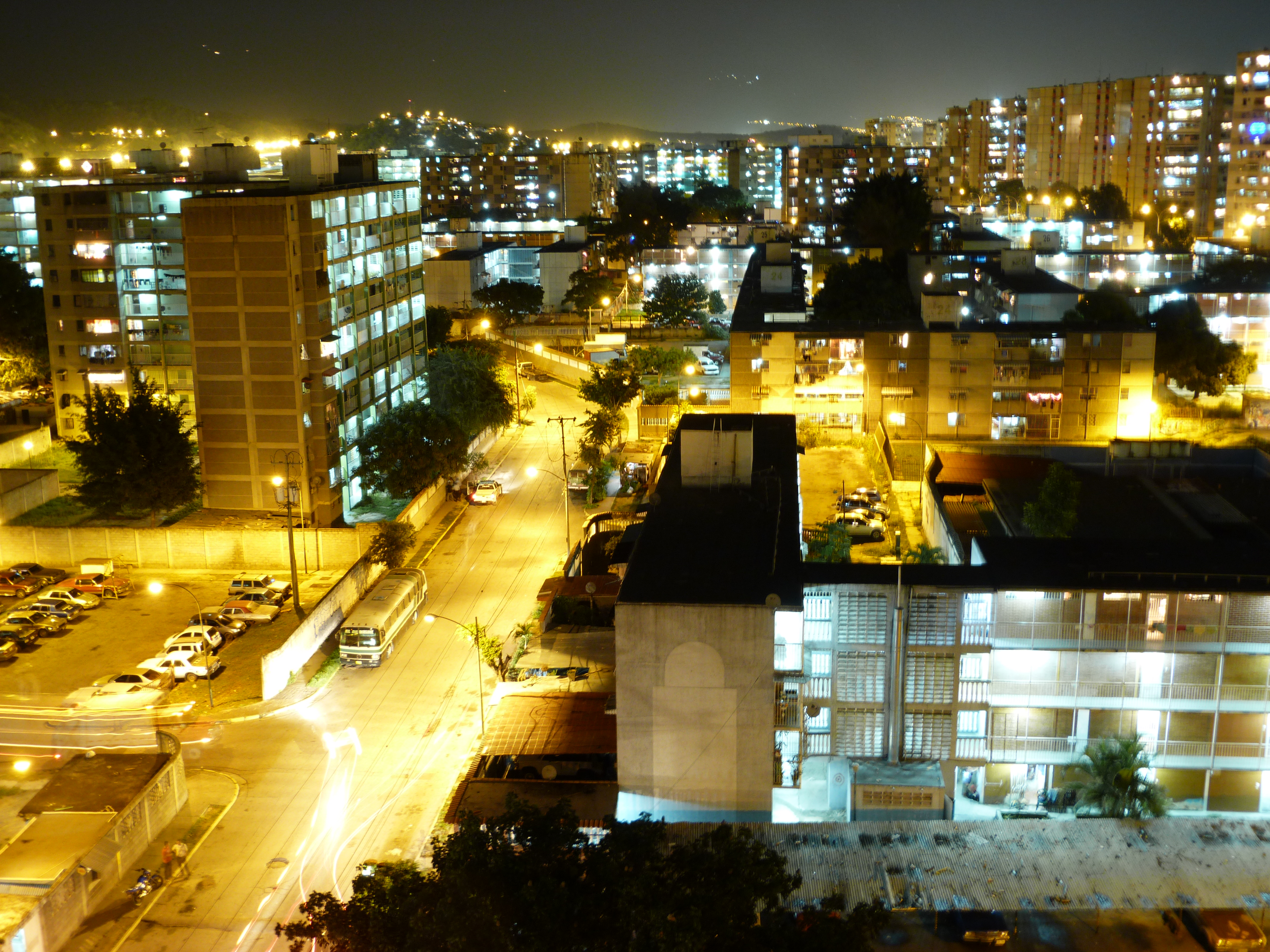
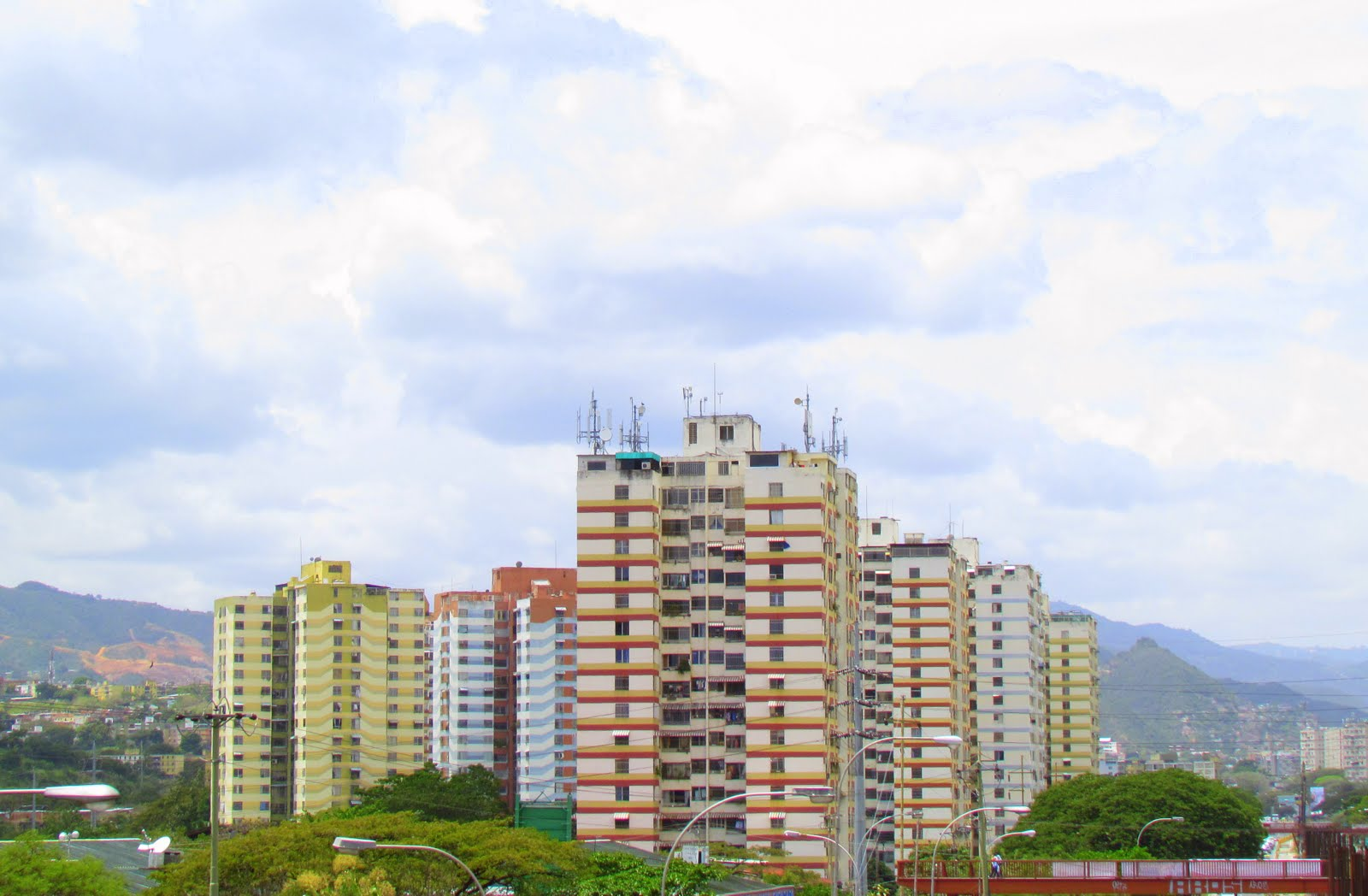
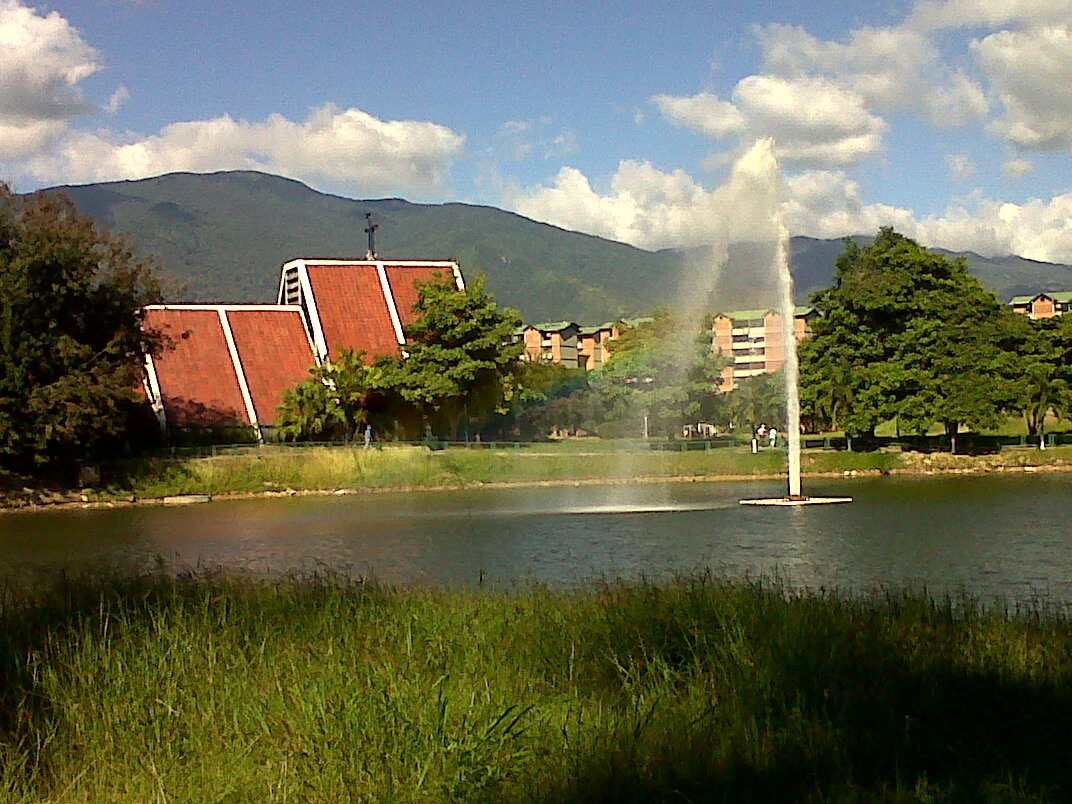
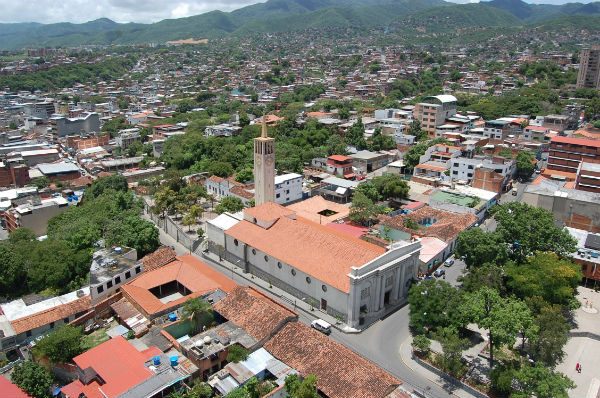
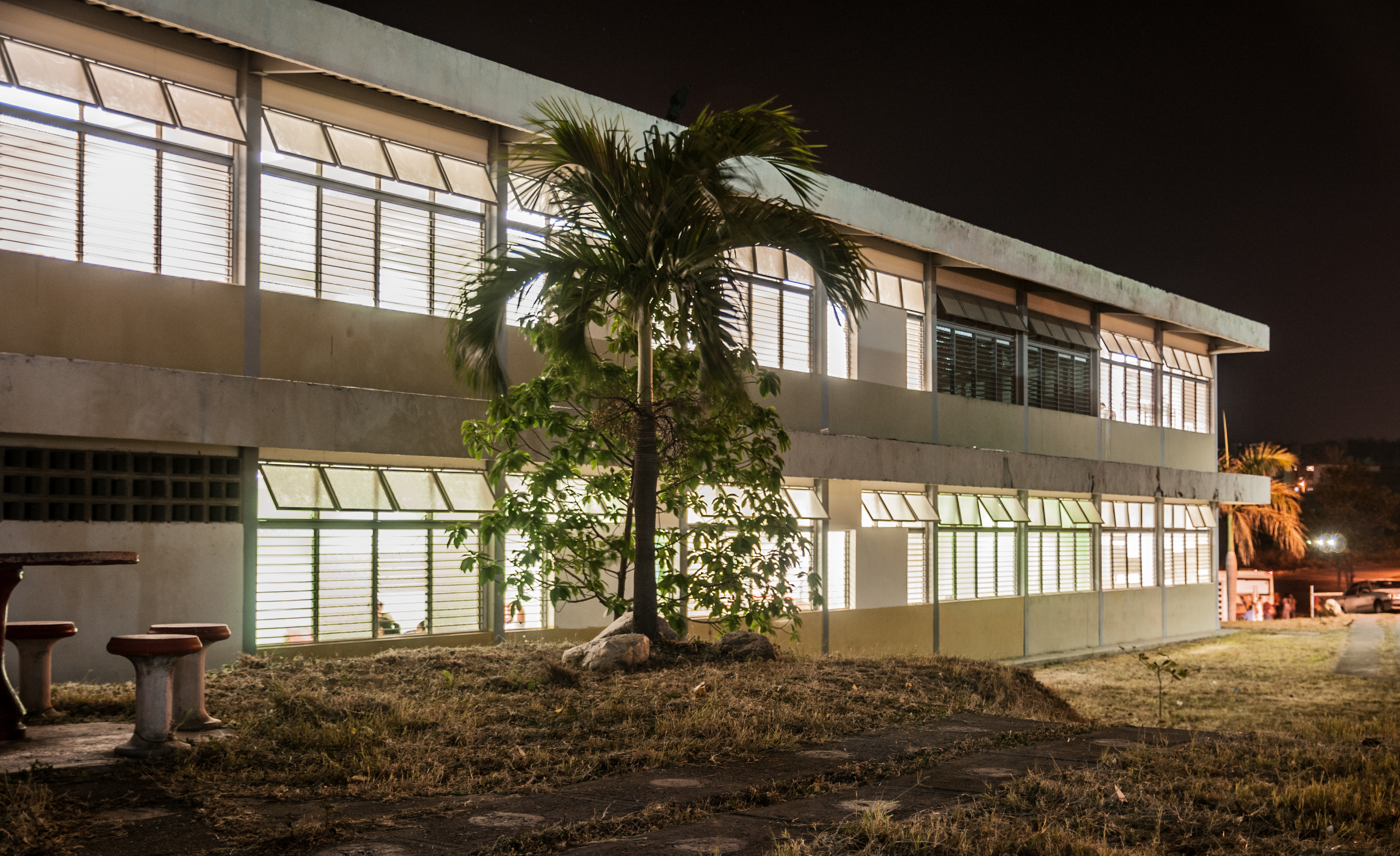
- Urbanization February 27, Villa Panamericana, Nueva Casarapa Lagoon, Guarenas' Bolivar Plaza and Educational Village in Guarenas

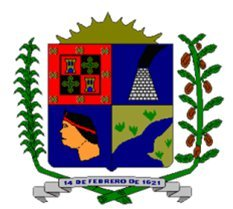
- Coat of arms

- Location in Venezuela
- Coordinates: 10°27′59″N 66°37′00″W
- Country: Venezuela
- State: Miranda
- Municipality: Ambrosio Plaza
- Founded: February 14, 1621

Government
  - Mayor: Antonio Galíndez Vallester (PSUV)

Area
  - Total: 142 km^{2} (55 sq mi)
- Elevation: 374 m (1,227 ft)

Population (2011)
  - Total: 200,417
  - Density: 1,411/km^{2} (3,650/sq mi)
- Time zone: UTC−4 (VET)
- Postal Code: 1220
- Area code: +58 212
- Climate: Aw
- Website: http://alcaldiadeplaza.gob.ve/

Guarenas is a city in Miranda, Venezuela. It was established in 1621 as Nuestra Señora de Copacabana de los Guarenas. It is part of the Guarenas-Guatire conurbation.

On February 27, 1989, a morning protest in this city over the recent nationwide hike in bus fares spread to Caracas, the capital of Venezuela, which resulted in several days of rioting known today as the Caracazo.

Today, Guarenas has virtually merged with its neighbor, Guatire. As of 2006, its population has been estimated at 185,010.

The Curupao Power Plant, which was inaugurated in 1933, still provides electricity to Guarenas and Guatire. The state also owned movie production facilities, as the Villa del Cine is situated in the city.

== History ==
On February 14, 1621, Guarenas was established as an indigenous mission town (pueblo de doctrina). Due to opposition from the encomenderos, the town was not formally established until 1623, by an order issued by the Royal Audiencia of Santo Domingo, in order to comply with a decree issued by King Philip III of Spain, requiring Indigenous people to live under the supervision of a missionary priest, to end the abuses committed against them by the encomenderos. Previous to this royal decree natural inhabitants of the estates of their trustees, which facilitated the abuses committed against them, and that made them work all week in the planting of the trustees not provided them land to sow for them and they did not recognize their day of rest nor religious holidays, to all of which the trustees were obliged by Spanish law, as well inflicting physical abuse him like slaves. The foundation originally took place in the mountains of Mariche, on a site that later became known as "El Rodeo". There the founding ceremony of the "Indian Village" was held called Our Lady of Copacabana of Guarenas, the site where would the square and the church as well as the stables of the population are marked.

Parcels assigned to inhabit were those of Hernando Closed and Avila, Francisco Infante de Ponte, Antonio Gamez de Acosta and Dona Micaela Perez de Ávila (wife of Lucas Martinez de Porras), made up of indigenous Chagaragotos (or Guarenas) and Mariches, so the indigenous council of Guarenas representation had two chiefs, one of Guarenas or Chagaragoto nation and a nation Mariche. Each of the trustees were assigned what they had to contribute to the manufacture and ornament of the church. The name "Guarenas" or "Huerena" comes from the Caribbean language and means "meadow" or "land of much grass" or "grassland" and was as chagaragotos Indians called these lands. The subsequent removal of the people to the place where it is currently held by the end of the seventeenth century.

It is approximately 39.2 miles or 36 minutes from Caracas.

== Economy ==
Traditionally, the city has three major industrial zones (Cloris, Maturin and Guairita) where medium and small industries are located, including textile factories, laboratories, distribution centers of various products and commercial vehicle dealers. However, this industrial area it has never been fully developed, and currently (with the exception of some companies such as laboratories) is in outright depression and abandonment.

Guarenas economy is based on its role as a bedroom community about Caracas. In modern times, the city has served as housing relief Caracas where the commercial sector (formal and informal) and services is the main economic activity, as the vast majority of the people get their jobs and income in the neighboring Venezuelan capital.

== Notable people ==
- Benito Canónico, musician, composer
- Juan Rivera, professional baseball former player
- Henry Blanco, professional baseball coach and former player
- Garbiñe Muguruza, professional tennis player
- Oswaldo Cabrera, professional baseball player for the New York Yankees
