= Plácido Acevedo =

Puerto Rican musician

- Born: June 6, 1904; Aguadilla, Puerto Rico
- Died: February 27, 1974 (aged 69); Barceloneta, Puerto Rico
- Occupation: musician

Plácido Acevedo (1904 – 1974) was a musician born in Aguadilla, Puerto Rico.

He played the flute and trumpet and was also a composer, known for his originality. Acevedo's compositions include "Boda Gris" (Gray Wedding), "Por seguir tus huellas" (By Following Your Steps), and "Cabellera Blanca" (White Hair).

After learning to play the flute, given by his father, Plácido Acevedo Sr., he studied the trumpet, and when he attained mastery of the instrument, he traveled to New York, where he made his best creations. One of his most popular compositions was the "Zorzal" (Robin). This composition was sung by almost everybody in his time.

He created numerous other pieces, including "Comedia" (Comedy), "Cuál Mágica Visión" (What Magical Vision), "Amargas Mi Existencia" (You Bitter My Existence), "Santuario Sagrado" (Sacred Sanctuary), "Tus Besos Me Hicieron Tanto Daño" (Your Kisses Harmed Me), "Hiéreme Sin Compasión" (Wound Me Without Compassion), "El Flamboyán", "Tu Castigo Será Grande" (Your Punishment Will Be Great), "Dulce veneno" (Sweet Poison), "Pobre Bardo" (Poor Bard), and "Dueña De Mi Inspiración" (Owner Of My Inspiration).

He founded the Mayarí Quartet in the 1930s, in honor of a town in Cuba. This Quartet is part of Puerto Rican musical history, having recorded more than thirty CDs.

After Acevedo's death, Chiquitín García became the director of the Mayarí Quartet.
