= Don Azpiazú =

Cuban orchestral director (1893–1943)

Justo Angel Azpiazu.
- Born: 11, February 1893.
- Died: 20, January 1943.
- Other names: Don Azpiazu
- Occupation: Cuban Orchestral Director.

Justo Ángel Azpiazú (Cienfuegos, 11 February 1893 – Havana, 20 January 1943), better known as Don Azpiazú, was a leading Cuban orchestral director in the 1920s and 1930s. His band introduced authentic Cuban dance music and Cuban musical instruments to the USA. It was his Havana Casino Orchestra which went to New York City in 1930, and recorded one of the biggest hits in Cuban music history, the "Peanut Vendor". It sold over one million copies, and was awarded a gold disc by the RIAA. The band included musicians such as trumpeter Julio Cueva and singer Antonio Machín. Azpiazú also used North American singers such as Bob Burke or Chick Bullock to help popularize the genre.
