= Benito Canónico =

Venezuelan composer (1894–1971)

- Born: January 3, 1894; Guarenas, Miranda, Venezuela
- Died: October 13, 1971 (aged 77) Caracas, Venezuela
- Genres: Venezuelan music
- Occupation: Composer

Benito Canónico (January 3, 1894 – October 13, 1971) was a Venezuelan composer, musician, orchestrator and teacher.

== Biography ==
Born in Guarenas, Miranda, Venezuela, Canónico spent much of his life teaching and writing music in a wide variety of genres and styles, including hymns, marches and popular music. Nevertheless, he received international recognition thanks to his popular song El Totumo de Guarenas, which has been performed and recorded by generations of classical guitarists.

He was the son of Agostino Canónico, an immigrant Italian musician who taught him to play violin at a young age. As a teenager, he took up the bugle to join a local military band, where he later switched to the clarinet. While at the band, he also learned to play trumpet and trombone, as well as several instruments of the saxhorn and woodwind families. In addition, he was a solid player of regional instruments such as the arpa mirandina and cuatro.

In the early 1920s Canónico moved with his family to Caracas, where he worked as a music teacher and devoted himself to composing and orchestrate. Besides this, he played during 22 years for the Banda Marcial Caracas, by then conducted by Pedro Elías Gutiérrez, and was a founding member of the Orquesta Típica Nacional in 1953. Both groups are considered Cultural Heritage of the Nation. In addition, one of his descendants, Daniel Canónico, was a notable professional baseball player.

Canónico gained further recognition after musician Alirio Díaz wrote a guitar transcription for the aforementioned El Totumo de Guarenas and premiered it in 1960 at Teatro Municipal de Caracas. Since then, the song has been recorded by a number of famous guitarists including Liona Boyd, Antonio Lauro, Flavio Sala and John Williams, among others.

Benito Canónico died in Caracas in 1971, at the age of 77, following a long illness.
