= The Peanut Vendor =

1930 superhit composed by Moisés Simons

"The Peanut Vendor (El manisero)"

Single by Don Azpiazú and His Havana Casino Orchestra
- B-side: "True Love (Amor sincero)"
- Released: September 1930
- Recorded: May 13, 1930
- Genre: Son-pregón
- Label: RCA Victor
- Songwriter: Moisés Simons
- Producer: Theodore F. Therrien

Don Azpiazú and His Havana Casino Orchestra singles chronology
"The Peanut Vendor (El manisero)" (1930)	"With My Guitar and You" (1930)

"El manisero", known in English as "The Peanut Vendor", is a Cuban son-pregón (street vendor's cry) composed by Moisés Simons. The song has been recorded more than 200 times, Sales of its sheet music topped 1 million, and it also was the first million-selling 78 rpm recording of Cuban music in the U.S.

"The Peanut Vendor" was inducted into the Latin Grammy Hall of Fame in 2001 and was added to the Library of Congress's National Recording Registry in 2005. It also has appeared in more than a half-dozen films, from the 1930s through the 2020s.

== History ==
Maní, maní, maní… si te quieres por el pico divertir, cómprame un cucuruchito de maní...

Maní, el manisero se va, caballero, no se vayan a dormir, sin comprarme un cucurucho de maní.

— First two verses of "El manisero"

The score and lyrics of "El manisero" were by Moisés Simons (1889–1945), the Cuban son of a Spanish musician. It sold over a million copies of sheet music for E.B. Marks Inc., earning $100,000 in royalties for Simons by 1943. Its success led to a 'rumba craze' in the US and Europe which lasted through the 1940s. The consequences of "The Peanut Vendor"'s success were far-reaching.

The number was first recorded for Columbia Records in 1927 or 1928 by Rita Montaner, a leading singer and actress of the period. The biggest record sales for "El manisero", however, came from the recording made by Don Azpiazú and his Havana Casino Orchestra in New York in 1930 for RCA Victor. The vocalist was Antonio Machín, who had recorded it the year before with a sextet that he led. The band featured a number of other star musicians, including Julio Cueva (trumpet) and Mario Bauza (saxophone) The total copies of 78 rpm recordings sold by Victor is unknown, but the song's sales easily topped a million, a first for Cuban (or even Latin) music.

The lyrics were in a style based on street vendors' cries, a pregón; and the rhythm was a son, so technically this was a son-pregón. On the record label, however, it was called a "rumba-fox trot", reflecting its Cuban origin and the 4/4 rhythm that suits the fox-trot dance. Thereafter, the term rhumba (the anglicized spelling of rumba) was used as a general label for Cuban music, as salsa is today, because the numerous Cuban terms were not understood abroad. Rhumba was easy to say and remember.

On the published score both music and lyrics are attributed to Simons, though there is a persistent story that they were written by Gonzalo G. de Mello in Havana the night before Montaner was due to record it in New York. Cristóbal Díaz says "For various reasons, we have doubts about this version... 'El manisero' was one of those rare cases in popular music where an author got immediate and substantial financial benefits... logically Mello would have tried to reclaim his authorship of the lyrics, but that did not occur." The second attack on the authorship of the lyrics came from Fernando Ortiz, who believed the true author was an unknown Havana peanut seller of the second half of the 19th century, who served as the basis for a danza written by Louis Moreau Gottschalk. Of course, it may be that elements of the song were to be found in real life. The English lyrics are by L. Wolfe Gilbert and Marion Sunshine; the latter was Azpiazú's sister-in-law, who toured with the band in the US as singer. The English lyrics are, in the opinion of Ned Sublette, of almost unsurpassed banality.

"The Peanut Vendor" had a second life as a hit number when Stan Kenton recorded it with his big band for Capitol Records, in 1947. This was also a great and long-lasting hit, re-recorded by Kenton twice with the band, and played by him later in life as a piano solo. The Kenton version was entirely instrumental, with the rhythmic pattern emphasized by trombones.

== Legacy and influence ==
"The Peanut Vendor" has been recorded more than 200 times. Because of its cultural importance, it was inducted into the United States National Recording Registry in 2005 by the National Recording Preservation Board, which noted:

"It is the first American recording of an authentic Latin dance style. This recording launched a decade of 'rumbamania', introducing U.S. listeners to Cuban percussion instruments and Cuban rhythms."

Several films included versions of "El Manisero". It appeared in The Cuban Love Song by Metro-Goldwyn-Mayer (1931), with Ernesto Lecuona as musical advisor; Groucho Marx briefly sang the tune in the film Duck Soup (1933); Cary Grant sang it alongside Jean Arthur in the film Only Angels Have Wings (1939); Jane Powell sang the song in Luxury Liner (1948); and Judy Garland sang a fragment in the film A Star is Born (1954). "The Peanut Vendor" was used as the tune in an advertising campaign for Golden Wonder Peanuts in the 1960s and '70s. More recently, it was featured in the Carnaval scene of José Luis Cuerda's film Butterfly (1999) and was also used in the reunion gala scene of David O. Russell’s Amsterdam (2022).

Cuban music—which has prominent African-derived elements—was also very popular in Central and West Africa starting in Kinshasa in the 1930s and spreading throughout Africa. In the 1960s, famous Nigerian High Life musician Cardinal Rex Lawson used the tune from The Peanut Vendor in his hit song Sawale. Because of this song, the melody remains known in Nigeria and was used by Nigerian musician Flavour N'abania in his song "Nwa Baby" (2011) and its remix.

A slowed version known as the Peanut Vendor riddim was recorded as "Top Ten" by reggae artiste Gregory Isaacs.

A version appeared in the fifth season premiere of the HBO series Boardwalk Empire.

== Selected recordings ==
The song appears on more than 200 releases, including both instrumental and vocal versions. Following is partial listing of some of the song's more significant recordings:

- 1928 Rita Montaner Columbia Records—first recording
- 1929 Sexteto Machin, Brunswick Records—sextet led by Antonio Machin
- 1930 Don Azpiazú & His Havana Casino Orchestra with Antonio Machin as vocalist, RCA Victor—the year's number 2 hit on the Billboard charts in the U.S.
- 1930 California Ramblers, Columbia Records—first recording by a U.S. band
- 1931 Louis Armstrong and His Sebastian New Cotton Club Orchestra, OKeh Records—first version by a U.S. jazz band
- 1933 Red Nichols & His Five Pennies, Brunswick Records—soundtrack for an experimental stop motion short by New Zealand artist and animator Len Lye
- 1938 Rosita Serrano, Telefunken—German recording
- 1940 Xavier Cugat & His Orchestra, Columbia Records
- 1948 Stan Kenton & His Orchestra, Capitol Records—second biggest selling 78 rpm version and first significant instrumental version
- 1949 Django Reinhardt on Djangology, RCA Victor—released 1961
- 1949 Pérez Prado, Havana 3 A.M., RCA Victor
- 1952 Dean Martin on The Capitol Recordings, Vol. 3 (1951-1952), Capitol Records
- 1957 Chet Atkins with the Rhythm Rockers, RCA Victor
- 1958 Anita O'Day on Anita Sings the Winners, Verve Records
- 1960 Alvin Red Tyler & The Gyros on Rockin' and Rollin', Ace Records—featured in 5th episode of season 2 of the Breaking Bad television series
- 1961 Rolando Laserie and Tito Puente on Pachanga in New York, Gema Records
- 1966 Chico O'Farrill and Clark Terry on Spanish Rice, Impulse!
- 1975 The Ritchie Family on Brazil, 20th Century Fox Records
- 1998 Esquivel! on See It in Sound, House of Hits Records—recorded 1960, previously unreleased
- 2001 The Gonzalo Rubalcaba Trio on Supernova, Blue Note Records
