= Puchito Records discography =

Puchito Records was Cuba's second independent record label. It was founded in 1954 during the mambo and cha-cha-chá explosion of the 1950s. Many of its recordings, produced by its founder Jesús Gorís (1921–2006), became instant hits. Cuban music styles represented in its discography include danzón, güajira, son cubano, son montuno, cha-cha-chá, guaracha, guaguancó, Cuban bolero, Cuban rumba, mambo, new flamenco, and Zarzuela. Other styles include farruca, merengue (Dominican), Ranchera (Mexican), nueva canción (Mexican) ... styles from Spain include cuplé, pasodoble, and flamenco. The ensembles range from studio orchestras to jazz combos to big bands to charangas.

== Singles ==
1. Joseíto Fernández y
  Su Conjunto
  Dialogs: Luisa Mauban, Juan C. Romaro, R. Miravallas
  "Tu Misma Me Acostumbraste"
  Joseíto Fernández (w&m)
  8005 (78 rpm)
2. Joseíto Fernández y
  Su Conjunto
  Dialogs: Martha Casanas, Juan C. Romaro, R. Miravallas
  "Copas y Amigos"
  Pedro Espinel Torres (w&m)
  8005 (78 rpm)
  (First known recording by Puchito; Puchito Catalog N° 101)
3. Ñico Membiela, vocal
  Orquesta Chuíto Vélez
  "Sa Lazaro"
  101-A (45 rpm)
4. Ñico Membiela, vocal
  Orquesta Chuíto Vélez
  "Olvido"
  By Miguel Matamoros
  101-B (45 rpm)
5. Joseíto Fernández y Su Conjunto
  "Mi Madre y Mi Tierra" (1957)
  By Joseíto Fernández
  45-102-A (45 rpm)
6. Joseíto Fernández y Su Conjunto
  "Tu Misma Me Acostumbraste" (1957)
  By Joseíto Fernández
  45-102-B (45 rpm)
7. Olga Guillot
  Castro Brothers Orchestra
  109 (released 1956)
8. Laíto Sureda y Conjunto Senén Suárez
  Released in 1952
  "Guaguancó Callejero" ("Dichosa Habana")
  (audio on YouTube)
  112
9. Laíto Sureda y Conjunto Senén Suárez
  Released in 1952
  "Yo Te Perdono"
  Roberto Goyeneche (music)
  Enrique Cadícamo (words)
  112
10. Conjunto Jóvenes Del Cayo
  Alfonsín Quintana (lead vocalist)
  "Qué Te Pasa ... Qué No Vienes"
  By Juan Puig
  115-1 (78 rpm)
  OCLC 883889873
11. Conjunto Jóvenes Del Cayo
  Domingo Vargas (lead vocalist)
  "Jorobita Joroba"
  Alfonso Salinas (w&m)
  115-2 (78 rpm)
  OCLC 883889873
12. Senén Suárez
  "La Negra Margot"
  By Juan A. Rojas
  A1 116-1
  OCLC 81023917
13. Senén Suárez
  "Con Suavidad"
  By José Betancourt)
  B1 116-2
  OCLC 81023917
14. Senén Suárez
  Y Su Conjunto del Tropicana Night Club
  "Señora Maria" (1953)
  Pablo Cairo (w&m)
  Matrix: 120-1
  Matrix: 78-1201
  120-A (78 rpm)
15. Senén Suárez
  Y Su Conjunto del Tropicana Night Club
  "Yambeque" (1953)
  Eduardo Angulo (w&m)
  Matrix: 120-2
  Matrix: 78-1202
  120-B (78 rpm)
16. Senén Suárez y Su Conjunto Del Tropicana Night Club
  Recorded around 1952
  "El '23'" ("Vapor")
  Senén Suárez (w&m)
  Senén Suárez y Raúl Fundora (vocalists)
  Serie Internacional 138
17. Olga Guillot con Su Orquesta Hermanos Castro
  Released 1954
  "Miénteme"
  Armando "Chamaco" Domínguez (w&m)
  161 (78 rpm)
  OCLC 884286512
18. Olga Guillot con Su Orquesta Hermanos Castro
  Released in 1954
  "Estamos En Paz"
  Antonio Pereyra (w&m)
  161 (78 rpm)
19. Olga Guillot con Su Orquesta Hermanos Castro
  "Por Eso Estoy Así"
  Juan Bruno Tarraza (w&m)
  162 (78 rpm)
20. Olga Guillot con Su Orquesta Hermanos Castro
  "Eso y Más"
  Juan Bruno Tarraza (w&m)
  162 (78 rpm)
21. Olga Guillot con Su Orquesta Hermanos Castro
  Released in 1954
  "Sola"
  Pablo De Los Andes (w&m)
  163?? (78 rpm)162
22. Olga Guillot con Su Orquesta Hermanos Castro
  Released in 1954
  "No Me Quieras Así"
  Facundo Rivero
  (Facundo Rivéro Montalvo) (words)
  Anonymous (music)
  163?? (78 rpm)162
23. Olga Guillot con Su Orquesta Hermanos Castro
  Released 1954
  "Palabras Calladas"
  (theme from the 1951 Mexican comedy film, Snow White)
  Juan Bruno Tarraza (w&m)
  165 (78 rpm)
  Matrix: G8-OB-3328
24. Olga Guillot con Su Orquesta Hermanos Castro
  Released 1954
  "Vivir de los Recuerdos"
  Bobby Collazo
  (Roberto Cecilio Collazo Peña)
  165 (78 rpm)
25. Olga Guillot con Su Orquesta Hermanos Castro
  Released 1954
  "En Nosotros"
  Tania Castellanos (w&m)
  171
  Matrix: G8-OB-8478
  OCLC 700214366
26. Olga Guillot con Su Orquesta Hermanos Castro
  Released 1954
  "Soy Tuya"
  Juan Bruno Tarraza (w&m)
  171
  Matrix: G8-OB-8479
27. Cheo Marquetti, vocal
  Orquesta Sensación
  "Guajiras de Hoy"
  176 (45 rpm)
28. Cheo Marquetti, vocal
  Orquesta Sensación
  "Seven Boy"
  176 (45 rpm)
29. Olga Guillot con Su Orquesta Hermanos Castro
  Released 1954
  "La Gloria Eres Tú"
  José Antonio Méndez (w&m)
  180-A (78 rpm)
30. Olga Guillot con Su Orquesta Hermanos Castro
  Released 1954
  "Al Fin Estoy Enamorada"
  Luis Yáñez (w&m)
  180-B (78 rpm)
31. Miguelito Valdés, vocal
  Castro Brothers Orchestra
  "Mamita Cambia"
  By José Slater Badán
  181
  (45 rpm) E4-KW-184
32. Miguelito Valdés, vocal
  Castro Brothers Orchestra
  "Mis Cinco Hijos"
  181
  (45 rpm) E4-KW-18?
33. Gina Martín, vocal
  Castro Brother Orchestra
  "A Santa Bárbara"
  By Celina & Reutilio
  (Reutilio Domínguez)
  187 (45 rpm)
34. Gina Martín, vocal
  Castro Brother Orchestra
  "El 17"
  By Celina & Reutilio
  (Reutilio Domínguez)
  187 (45 rpm)
35. Chappottín y sus Estrellas
  Vocalists:
  Rene Alvarez
  Wichi
  Filiberto Hernández Fuentes
  "Yo Soy Tiburón"
  Jesús Guerra (w&m)
  (audio on YouTube)
  199-AOCLC 884370033, 82831793
36. Chappottín y sus Estrellas
  Vocalists:
  Rene Alvarez
  Wichi
  Filiberto Hernández Fuentes
  "Blanca Luna"
  Virgilio González Solar
  199-B
  OCLC 78284042
37. Orquesta Sensación
  Rolando Valdés, director
  "Aprendiendo el Chachacha" (1958)
  By Rolando Valdés
  206-A
  (45 rpm) F8-OW-0884
38. Orquesta Sensación
  Rolando Valdés, director
  "Caumbia" (1958)
  By Pedro Ramos
  206-B
  (45 rpm) F8-OW-0885
39. René del Mar and His Cunjunto
  "Como Te Gusta A Ti"
  Enrique Bonne
  209
  (45 rpm) F8-OW-6793
40. René del Mar and His Cunjunto
  "Quedate Con Todo"
  209
  (45 rpm) F8-OW-6792
41. Chappottín y sus Estrellas
  Miguelito Cuní, vocalist
  "Que Se Fuñan" (1958)
  By Luis Martínez Griñán
  220
  (45 rpm) F8-OW-8474
42. Chappottín y sus Estrellas
  "No Vengas Por Mi" (1958)
  By Félix Chappottín
  220 (45 rpm)
43. Orquesta Hermanos Castro
  With Carlos Díaz
  "Amanecer Cubano"
  Julio Blanco Léonard (w&m)
  222-A (45 rpm)
44. Orquesta Hermanos Castro
  With Carlos Díaz
  "Cayetano Baila"
  Parmenio Salazar Jústiz (w&m)
  222-B (45 rpm)
45. Orquesta Sensación
  "Soy Como Soy"
  Pedro Junco (w&m)
  223 (45 rpm)
  OCLC 83545446
46. Orquesta Sensación
  "Arrancame La Vida"
  Agustín Lara (w&m)
  223
  (45 rpm) F8-OW-6858
  OCLC 84626592
47. Abelardo Barroso
  Orquesta Sensación
  ”La hija de Juan Simón” (1955)
  224 (45 rpm)
48. Abelardo Barroso
  Orquesta Sensación)
  ”En Guantánamo” (1955)
  224 (45 rpm)
49. Orquesta Sensación
  "Cachita"
  232 (45 rpm)
50. Orquesta Sensación
  "Nosotros"
  232 (45 rpm)
51. Orquesta Sensación
  "Corazón, No Llores"
  Rafael Hernández (w&m)
  239-A
  (45 rpm) FO-8W-0350
  (78 rpm) FO-8B-0350
52. Orquesta Sensación
  "A Una Ola"
  María Grever (w&m)
  239-B
  (45 rpm) FO-8W-0351
  (78 rpm) FO-8B-0351
53. Orquesta Sensación
  "Corazón No Llores"
54. Orquesta Sensación
  "A Una Ola"
  María Grever (w&m)
  239
  (45 rpm) FO-8W-0351
  (78 rpm) FO-8B-0351
55. Celina y Reutilio
  (Reutilio Domínguez)
  "La Caridad Del Cobre"
  244 (45 rpm)
56. Celina y Reutilio
  (Reutilio Domínguez)
  "El Rey Del Mundo"
  244 (45 rpm)
57. Celina y Reutilio
  (Reutilio Domínguez)
  "Oye Mi Olelolei" (1958)
  Miguel Ojeda Díaz (w&m)
  Clavelito (pseudonym of
  Miguel Ángel Pozo) (w&m)
  245
  (45 rpm) G8-OW-8715
58. Celina y Reutilio
  "El Hijo De Elegua" (1958)
  245
  (45 rpm) G8-OW-8715
59. Rosita Fornés y Orquesta Hermanos Castro
  "Es Mi Hombre" (1955)
  Maurice Yvain (music)
  251 (78 rpm)
  Matrix: FO-8B-0330
60. Rosita Fornés y Orquesta Hermanos Castro
  "Sensualidad" (1955)
  251 (78 rpm)
  Matrix: FO-8B-0331
61. Gina Martín, vocal
  Chappottín y sus Estrellas
  "Cabio Sile Yeyeo" (1958)
  Eduardo Angulo
  254
  (45 rpm) G8-OW-0263
62. Gina Martín, vocal
  Chappottín y sus Estrellas
  "No Puedes Dejarme" (1958)
  Luis Martínez Griñán (w&m)
  254
  (45 rpm) G8-OW-0763
63. Sensación Orquesta
  "Allá en el Rancho Grande"
  Silvano R. Ramos (w&m)
  Jararaca & Ratinho
  (José Luís Rodrigues Calazans)
  Vicente Paiva
  45-261
  F8-OW-3111
64. Sensación Orquesta
  "Siempre en mi Corazón"
  Ernesto Lecuona (music)
  45-261
  F8-OW-3112
65. Abelardo Barroso
  Orquesta Sensación
  "El Manisero" (1956)
  262
  (78 rpm)
  FB-OB-3113
  45 G8-OW-3113
  OCLC 84977883, 81455334
66. Abelardo Barroso
  Orquesta Sensación
  "Resabroso Cha-Cha-Cha" (1956)
  By Gilberto Ruíz
  262
  (78 rpm)
  FB-OB-3113
  45 G8-OW-3113
  OCLC 81455334
67. Chappottín y sus Estrellas
  Miguelito Cuní, vocalist
  "Fidelina"
  By Eloy Martínez
  282
  (45 rpm) G8-OW-7580
68. Chappottín y sus Estrellas
  "La Protesta de Baraguá"
  Luis Martínez Griñán (w&m)
  282 (45 rpm)
69. Orquesta Riverside
  Tito Gómez (vocalist)
  Pedro Vila, director
  "Ritmando Cha Cha Chá"
  Bebo Valdés (w&m)
  288-A
  (45 rpm) ICD-45-115 A (Note: Matrix codes beginning with ICD indicate that the record was manufactured by Impresora Cubana de Discos, S.A., in Havana (nacionalizada); this was the post-revolution nationalized label)
  (78 rpm) G8-0B-8753 1
70. Orquesta Riverside
  Tito Gómez (vocalist)
  Pedro Vila, director
  "Bayamo"
  Ramóne Cabrera (w&m)
  288-B
  (45 rpm) ICD-45-115 B
  (78 rpm) G8-0B-8753 1
  OCLC 953040185
71. Pototo y Filomeno con Melodías del 40
  "Carta de Mamita"
  295
  (78 rpm) Matrix: G8-OB-9016
72. Pototo y Filomeno con Melodías del 40
  "Hhorita va Llové"
  295
  (78 rpm) Matrix: G8-OB-9017
73. Guaguancó Matancero
  Released in 1954
  "Los Beodos"
  By Lorenzo Martínez
  298 (78 rpm)
  G8-OB-9904
  45 G8-OW-9904
74. Guaguancó Matancero
  Released in 1954
  Hortensio Alfonso (aka "Virulilla") (vocalist)
  Esteban Lantri (aka "Saldiguera") (vocalist)
  "Los Muñequitos"
  Esteban Lantrí (w&m)
  (audio on YouTube)
  298 (78 rpm)
  G8-OB-9905
  45 G8-OW-9905
75. Chappottín y sus Estrellas
  Miguelito Cuní, vocal
  "Rompe Saraguey," Virgilio Gonzalez
  302 (45 rpm) GO-8W-0541?
76. Chappottín y sus Estrellas
  Miguelito Cuní, vocal
  "No Tiene Telaraña,"
  302 (45 rpm)
77. Rita Montaner
  "Ya No Creo"
  Eduardo Saborit Pérez (w&m)
  Rita Montaner (w&m)
  305
78. Rita Montaner
  "Ay, Qué Sospecha Tengo"
  305
79. Guaguancó Matancero
  Saldiguera & Virulilla
  "Tá Contento el Pueblo"
  By Florencio Calle
  309
  (45 rpm) H8-OB-2679
80. Guaguancó Matancero
  Saldiguera & Virulilla
  "Cantar Maravilloso"
  By Esteban Lantri
  309
  (45 rpm) H8-OB-2680
81. Orquesta Riverside
  Pedro Vila, director
  Tito Gómez (lead vocalist)
  "Me Voy Pa' Pinar del Río"
  Néstor P. Cruz
  Pseudonym of Néstor Pinelo (w&m)
  (né Néstor Manuel Pinelo Cruz)
  310-A (45 rpm)
  8008-A (45 rpm)
82. Orquesta Riverside
  Pedro Vila, director
  Tito Gómez (lead vocalist)
  "Yo Fui, Corazón"
  Juan Bruno Tarraza (w&m)
  310-B (45 rpm)
  8008-B (45 rpm)
83. Chappottín y sus Estrellas
  "Yo Si Como Candela"
  By Félix Chappottín
  321
  (45 rpm) H8-OW-3854
84. Chappottín y sus Estrellas
  Miguelito Cuní, vocal
  "Nereyda"
  By Gustavo Betancourt
  321
  (45 rpm) H8-OW-3853
85. Grupo Guaguancó Matancero
  "El Chisme de la Cuchara"
  Florencio Calle "Catalino" (w&m)
  331 A
  (45 rpm) H8-OW-4772
86. Grupo Guaguancó Matancero
  "La Bandera de mi Tierra"
  Florencio Calle "Catalino" (w&m)
  331 B
  (45 rpm)
87. Conjunto Casablanca
  Ernesto García, vocal
  "Mi Cochecito"
  Juanito Blez (w&m)
  332
  (45 rpm) H8-OW-4785
88. "Te Miro En La Copa"
  By Tony Tejera
  332
  (45 rpm) H8-OW-4784
89. Orquesta Riverside
  Tito Gómez (vocalist)
  "Eterna Vanidad"
  María Antonia Fariñas
  335-A (45 rpm)
90. Orquesta Riverside
  Tito Gómez (vocalist)
  "Mulata Guapachá"
  Luis Yáñez
  Rolando Gómez (w&m)
  335-B (45 rpm)
91. Orquesta Loyola
  "Escucha El Silbidito"
  By Héctor de Soto
  338
  (45 rpm) H8-5W-5275
92. Orquesta Loyola
  "Amor En Chachacha"
  338 (45 rpm)
93. Alberto Rochi con el Conjunto Casablanca
  "Rondando Tu Esquina"
  By Carlos José Pérez "Charlo
  346-A (45 rpm)
94. Alberto Rochi con el Conjunto Casablanca
  "Idilio"
  346-B (45 rpm)
95. Conjunto Casablanca
  "Como Esta La Malanga"
  Félix Cárdenas (w&m)
  347-A (45 rpm)
96. Conjunto Casablanca
  "No Pongo Condición"
  347-B (45 rpm)
97. Orquesta Riverside
  Tito Gómez, vocal
  Pedro Vila, conductor
  "Vereda Tropical"
  352 (45 rpm)
98. Orquesta Riverside
  "Chachachá de Los Perros"
  352 (45 rpm)
99. Conjunto Casablanca
  Ernesto García, vocal
  "Nuevo Para Ti"
  Alfonso Fleitas
  354-A
  (45 rpm) ICD-45-773 A
100. Conjunto Casablanca
  Ernesto García, vocal
  "Ritmo De Palo"
  By Senén Suárez
  354-B
  (45 rpm) ICD-45-773 B
101. Guaguancó Matancero
  Hortensio Alfonso (aka "Virulilla") (vocalist)
  Esteban Lantri (aka "Saldiguera") (vocalist)
  "Te Aseguro Yo"
  Florencio Calle "Catalino" (w&m)
  359-A (45 rpm)
102. Guaguancó Matancero
  Hortensio Alfonso (aka "Virulilla") (vocalist)
  Esteban Lantri (aka "Saldiguera") (vocalist)
  "En Este Ritmo"
  Florencio Calle "Catalino" (w&m)
  359-B (45 rpm)
103. Orquesta Melodías del 40
  "Tunas-Bayamo"
  Regino Frontela Fraga (w&m)
  263-A (45 rpm)
  G8-0B-3289
104. Orquesta Melodías del 40
  "Prisionero"
  Julián Fiallo (w&m)
  263-B (45 rpm)
  G8-0B-3290
105. Orquesta Riverside
  Adolfo Guzmán, director
  Tito Gómez, vocal
  "Blancas Azucenas"
  369-A (45 rpm)
106. Orquesta Riverside
  Adolfo Guzmán, director
  Tito Gómez, vocal
  "Mañana Por la Mañana"
  369-B (45 rpm)
107. Severíno Ramos y Su Orquesta
  (Severíno Ramos Betancourt)
  Héctor Prado Jiménez y Cuarteto Valdivia (vocalists)
  "Cha Cha Güere"
  Luis Reyes (w&m)
  Severíno Ramos (w, m & arr.)
  371-A (45 rpm)
108. Severíno Ramos y Su Orquesta
  "Mi Gran Locura"
  Severíno Ramos (w&m)
  Carlos López (w&m)
  371-B (45 rpm)
109. Papín y Sus Rumberos
  "Mi Quinto"
  Pascual Herrera (w&m)
  Ricardo Abreu Hernández (w&m)
  379-A (45 rpm)
110. Papín y Sus Rumberos
  "Franciscua"
  Alfredo Abreu (w&m)
  379-B (45 rpm)
111. Olga Guillot
  "No Ya No Te Puedo Amar"
  381-A (45 rpm)
112. Olga Guillot
  "La Noche De Anoche"
  381-B (45 rpm)
113. Orquesta Riverside
  Adolfo Guzmán, director
  "Guacanayabo"
  Ángel Castro (w&m)
  383-A (45 rpm)
114. Orquesta Riverside
  Adolfo Guzmán, director
  "Todo en Tí" ("Habla de Amor")
  Pedro Méndez
  Severíno Ramos
  383-B (45 rpm)
115. Papín y Sus Rumberos
  Fuico (né Rolando Hermido Franco) (vocalist)
  "Tu Olvido" ("Los Rosales")
  Vicente Spina (w&m)
  385-A (45 rpm)
116. Papín y Sus Rumberos
  Fuico (né Rolando Hermido Franco) (vocalist)
  1. "María de la O"
    Salvador Valverde (words)
    Rafael de León (words)
    Manuel Quiroga (music)
  2. "La Bien Pagá" ("Well-paid Woman")
    Juan Mostazo (music)
    Ramón Perelló (words)
  385-B (45 rpm)
117. Septeto Nacional
  Ignacio Piñeiro
  "Eterna Primavera"
  389-A (45 rpm)
118. Septeto Nacional
  Ignacio Piñeiro
  "Llegó La Tora"
  Ignacio Piñeiro (music)
  389-B (45 rpm)
119. Orquesta Sensación
  Rolando Valdés, director
  Tabenito (née Mario Varona) (vocals)
  Luis Donald (vocals)
  "Vacila con tú Trago"
  Music and words by:
  Rolando Valdés
  "Si tú Supieras," Tony Tejera
  "Abrázame Así," Mario Clavell
  390-A (45 rpm)
120. Orquesta Sensación
  Rolando Valdés, director
  "Cha Cha Latin"
  390-B (45 rpm)
121. Arsenio Rodríguez y Su Conjunto
  Luís "Wito" Kortright (vocals)
  Julián Llanos (vocals)
  Cándido Antomattei (vocals)
  "Carraguao Alante"
  By Emma Lucía Martínez
  393-A
  (45 rpm) ICD 45-139 A
  (Hecho en Cuba por Impresora Cubana de Discos S.A.)
122. Arsenio Rodríguez y Su Conjunto
  Luís "Wito" Kortright (vocals)
  Julián Llanos (vocals)
  Cándido Antomattei (vocals)
  "Hay Fuego En El 23"
  By Emma Lucía Martínez
  393-B
  (45 rpm) ICD 45-139 B
  (Hecho en Cuba por Impresora Cubana de Discos S.A.)
123. Orquesta Riverside
  Adolfo Guzmán, director
  Tito Gómez (vocalist)
  "Amor Amor"
  Gabriel Ruíz (w&m)
  397-A
124. Orquesta Riverside
  Adolfo Guzmán, director
  Tito Gómez (vocalist)
  "Pensamiento"
  Eduardo Sánchez de Fuentes
  397-B
125. Chapuseaux & Damiron
  Gilberto Valdes, flute soloist
  "Alla Va Eso"
  By Adelina Leido
  402
  (45 rpm) J8-OW-7934
126. "La Subidora,"
  402 (45 rpm)
127. Mercedita Valdés con
  Papín y Sus Rumberos
  "Er' Día Que Nací Yo"
  Antonio Quintero (w&m)
  Pascual Guillén (w&m)
  Juan Mostazo (w&m)
  411-A (45 rpm)
128. Mercedita Valdés con
  Papín y Sus Rumberos
  "Ya Me Cansé"
  Contains:
  1. "Miénteme"
    Armando "Chamaco" Domínguez (w&m)
  2. "Lo Siento Por Ti"
    Rafael Hernández Marín (w&m)
  3. "El Amor Es Una Cosa Eplendorosa"
    Sammy Fain (music)
    Paul Francis Webster (words)
  411-B (45 rpm)
129. Papín y Sus Rumberos
  "Tani"
  413-A (45 rpm)
130. Papín y Sus Rumberos
  "Saludo Nacional"
  413-B (45 rpm)
131. Orquesta Riverside
  Adolfo Guzmán, director; Tito Gómez, vocal
  "Cuando Ya No Me Quieras"
  By Curates Castilla
  418-A
  (45 rpm) ICD-45-107 A
132. Orquesta Riverside
  Adolfo Guzmán, director
  Tito Gómez, vocal
  "Frenesi"
  By Alberto Domínguez
  418-B
  (45 rpm) ICD-45-107 B
133. Rolo Martinez; Orquesta de Raul Díaz
  "Vida de Mi Amor"
  Gustavo Betancourt
  427-A
  (45 rpm) ICD-45-119 A
134. Rolo Martinez; Orquesta de Raul Díaz
  "Lo Decia El"
  427-B
  (45 rpm) ICD-45-119 B
135. Solera De España
  Enrique Oliva, director
  Jaime Ventura (vocalist)
  "La Escalera"
  Benito Ulecia (music)
  Fernando Rodríguez Clemente (words)
  431-A
  (45 rpm) ICD-45-136 A
  Grabacion Musart
136. Solera De España
  Enrique Oliva, director
  Jorge De La Cruz (vocalist)
  "El Nombre de España"
  Antonio Guijarro Campoy (words)
  Manuel Monreal Díaz (music)
  431-B
  (45 rpm) ICD-45-136 B
  Grabacion Musart
137. Pototo y Filomeno
  Melodías Del 40
  "Una Carta De Fidel"
  By Leopoldo Fernández
  437-A (45 rpm)
  Matrix: ICD-45 152 A
  (manufactured by Impresora Cubana de Discos S.A.)
138. Pototo y Filomeno
  Melodías Del 40
  "Ensalada Rebelde"
  By M. Godinet & Leopoldo Fernández
  437-B (45 rpm)
  Matrix: ICD-45 152 B
  (manufactured by Impresora Cubana de Discos S.A.)
139. Papín y Sus Rumberos
  "Blancas Margaritas"
  444-A (45 rpm)
140. Papín y Sus Rumberos
  "Yo Soy Cubano"
  444-B (45 rpm)
141. Antonio Aguilar Barraza
  "Bala Perdida"
  448-A (45 rpm)
142. "Sonaron Cuatro Balazos"
  448-B (45 rpm)
143. Orquesta Riverside, Adolfo Guzmán, director
  Tito Gómez, vocal
  "Mambo Mambi"
  By Mario Bauzá
  Arr by René Hernandez
  452-B
  (45 rpm) ICD-45-212 B
144. Orquesta Estrellas Cubanas
  Calzado brothers (vocals):
  Pedro Manuel "Rudy" Calzado
  Luis Mariano Calzado
  Sergio Calzado
  "Di Que Sí Me Quieres"
  Félix Reina (w&m)
  460-A
  (45 rpm) ICD-45-238 A
145. Orquesta Estrellas Cubanas
  Calzado brothers (vocals):
  Pedro Manuel "Rudy" Calzado
  Luis Mariano Calzado
  Sergio Calzado
  "Ya No Vuelvas Mas"
  Félix Reina (w&m)
  460-B
  (45 rpm) ICD-45-238 B
146. Pototo y Filomeno y Su Orquesta
  "Enciéndeme la Vela"
  Luis Fernández (w&m)
  Bienvenido Brens (w&m)
  467
  (45 rpm) Matrix: ICD-45-256 A
147. Pototo y Filomeno y Su Orquesta
  "El Jabonero"
  Eliseo Grenet (w&m)
  Antonio Radillo
  467
  (45 rpm) Matrix: ICD-45-256 B
148. Fuico y Su Ritmo
  "Yo Tenía Una Mujer"
  Released 1959
  471-A
  (45 rpm) ICD-45-273 A
149. Fuico y Su Ritmo
  "Al Pan y Al Vino"
  Ricardo Díaz (w&m)
  Released 1959
  471-B
  (45 rpm) ICD-45-273 B
150. Julio Cueva and His Orchestra
  "El Golpe Bibijagua"
  By Julio Cueva
  486-A (78 rpm)
  (45 rpm) G8-OB-330-A
  (45 rpm) ICD-45-330 A
151. Julio Cueva and His Orchestra
  "El Marañon"
  486-B (78 rpm)
  (45 rpm) G8-OB-330-B
  (45 rpm) ICD-45-330 B
152. Estrellas de Chocolate (Félix "Chocolate" Alfonso)
  Filiberto Hernández Fuentes & León Lahera Wilson, vocals
  "Fania"
  By Reinaldo Bolaños
  490-A
  (45 rpm) ICD-45-334 A
153. Estrellas de Chocolate
  "Era De Esperar"
  By Eugenio Lahera Wilson
  490-B
  (45 rpm) ICD-45-334 B
154. "Quiero Comprenderte"
  452-A
  (45 rpm) ICD-45-212 A
155. Orquesta Sensación
  "Rosa Mustia"
  By Ángel Díaz
  492-A (78 rpm)
  (45 rpm) ICD-45-336 A
156. Orquesta Sensación
  "Don Tenorio"
  By Evelio Landa
  492-B (78 rpm)
  (45 rpm) ICD-45-336 B
157. Orquesta Riverside
  Tito Gómez (vocalist)
  "No Es Posible Querer Tanto"
  By Adolfo Guzmán
  493-A (45 rpm)
  Matrix: ICD-45-337 A 493
158. Orquesta Riverside
  Tito Gómez (vocalist)
  "Otra Descarga"
  By Pedro Jústiz
  493-B (45 rpm)
  Matrix: ICD-45-337 B 493
159. Abelardo Barroso
  Orquesta Sensación
  "Coctel Para Dos"
  Coslow & Johnson (w&m)
  496 (78 rpm)
  (45 rpm) G8-45-362-A
  45 ICD-45-362 A
160. Abelardo Barroso
  Orquesta Sensación
  "Vuelve Navidad"
  496 (78 rpm)
  (45 rpm) G8-45-362 B
  (45 rpm) ICD-45-362 B
161. Banda Policía Nacional Revolucionaria
  Patrullas Juveniees, chorus
  "Himno Nacional Cubano"
  By Perucho Figueredo
  497-A
  (45 rpm) 45-497-A
162. Banda Policía Nacional Revolucionaria
  Patrullas Juveniees, chorus
  "Himno Invasor"
  497-B
  (45 rpm) 45-497-B
163. Julio Cueva and His Orchestra
  "Tingo Talango"
  By Julio Cueva
  501-A
  G8-OB-387-A
  (45 rpm) ICD-45-387 A
164. Julio Cueva and His Orchestra
  "Chicharron de Palanca"
  501-B
  G8-OB-387-B
  (45 rpm) ICD-45-387 B
165. Tabenito (née Mario Varona) (vocalist) con la
  Orquesta Sensación
  Directed by Rolando Valdés
  "Danzon Cha"
  By Rolando Valdés
  539-A
  (45 rpm) ICD-45-582 A
166. Eddy Álvarez con la
  Orquesta Sensación
  Directed by Rolando Valdés
  "Contra Tu Traición"
  By Marcelino Garriga
  539-B
  (45 rpm) ICD-45-582 B
167. Olga Guillot y Orquesta Humberto Suárez
  "Comunicando Rock"
  Luis Palomar Dapena (words)
  Segovia (pseudonym of
  Antonio López-Quiroga) (music)
  565-A
  (45 rpm) ICD-45-??? A
  Released on 78 rpm & 45 rpm
  Catalog N° 8001-A
  OCLC 124082354, 254390328
168. Olga Guillot y Orquesta Humberto Suárez
  "Vete Di Mi"
  Virgilio Expósito (music)
  Homero Expósito (words)
  565-B
  (45 rpm) ICD-45-??? B
  Released on 78 rpm & 45 rpm
  Catalog N° 8001-B
  OCLC 124082354, 254390328
169. Beto Díaz y Su Orquesta
  (Mario Roberto Díaz Hornedo)
  "Palitos Chinos"
  (audio on YouTube)
  Jack Lawrence (music)
  Eliot Daniel (music)
  610-A
  (45 rpm) P-610-A
170. Beto Díaz y Su Orquesta
  (Mario Roberto Díaz Hornedo)
  "Envidias"
  José Ángel Espinoza
  610-B
  (45 rpm) P-610-B
171. Conroy (Conrado) Wilson & His Combo
  "El Manisero"
  By Moisés Simons
  620-A
  (45 rpm) ICD-45-946 B
  (45 rpm) 45-8012
172. Conroy (Conrado) Wilson & His Combo
  "A B C Blues"
  By Conroy (Conrado) Wilson
  620-B
  (45 rpm) ICD-45-946 A
173. Carlos M. Delgado
  y Su Cunjunto
  "Hormiga o Alacran"
  Carlos M. Delgado (w&m)
  (45 rpm) 45-8013
174. "La Lengua de Gabino"
  (45 rpm) 45-8013
175. Orquesta Riverside
  "Consolacion del Sur"
  By Nestor P. Cruz
  8018-A (45 rpm)
176. Orquesta Riverside
  "Mira Que Bonita"
  By Juanito Márquez
  8018-B (45 rpm)
177. Ñico Membiela con
  Pepe Delgado y Su Orquesta
  "Siboney"
  Ernesto Lecuona (w&m)
  (45 rpm) 45-8031
178. Ñico Membiela con
  Pepe Delgado y Su Orquesta
  "Como Arrullo de Palma"
  Ernesto Lecuona (w&m)
  (45 rpm) 45-8031
179. Conroy (Conrado) Wilson & His Combo
  "Verano de Amor" (theme from A Summer Place)
  By Max Steiner
  621-A
  (45 rpm) ICD-45-??? A
180. Conroy (Conrado) Wilson & His Combo
  "Ojos Negros"
  621-B
  (45 rpm) ICD-45-??? B
181. Lino Borges
  Con el Conjunto Rumbavana
  "Enseñame Tu"
  Jorge Zamora Montalvo
  636-A
  (45 rpm) ICD-45-1012 A
  Puchito ECAD-MINCIN
  Hecho Por Impresora Cubana de Discos
  (Nacionalizada)
182. Lino Borges
  Con el Con el Conjunto Rumbavana
  "Paloma Herida"
  636-B
  (45 rpm) ICD-45-1012 B
  Puchito ECAD-MINCIN
  Hecho Por Impresora Cubana de Discos
  (Nacionalizada)
183. Conroy (Conrado) Wilson & His Combo
  Magic Guitar with a
  Latin Twist and Cuban Music
  Side A:
  1. "A.B.C. Twist"
  2. "Ojos Negros"
    D.R. (Derechos Reservados)
  Side B:
  1. "Verando de Amor" (theme from A Summer Place)
    Max Steiner
  2. "Hojas Muertas"
    Joseph Kosma (music)
    Jacques Prévert (words)
  PEP-560 (45 rpm) (Spain)
  Distribuidora Cubana de Discos (jacket)
  Producido En España Por Iberofon S.A. (label)

== Single imports ==
=== Talía Industria Manufacturera De Disco S.A. (manufactured in Peru) ===
184. Pototo y Filomeno
  "Bebo y Obligo"
  Carlos Gardel (music)
  Manuel Romero (words)
  X-005-A
185. Pototo y Filomeno
  "El Ritmo Cubano"
  Leopoldo Fernández & Eduardo Saborit (es) (w&m)
  X-005-B
186. Celina y Reutilio
  (Reutilio Domínguez; 1921–1972)
  "A Santa Bárbara"
  (aka "Que viva Changó")
  Celina González (m&w)
  Reutilio Domínguez (1921–1972) (m&w)
  (This is not the song:
  "Santa Bárbara bendita")
  X-013-A (45 rpm)
  Manufactured by Talía (Peru)
187. Celina y Reutilio
  (Reutilio Domínguez; 1921–1972)
  "El Hijo De Elegua"
  X-015-A (45 rpm)
  Manufactured by Talía (Peru)
188. Celina y Reutilio
  (Reutilio Domínguez; 1921–1972)
  "El Rey Del Mundo"
  X-015-B (45 rpm)
  Manufactured by Talía (Peru)
  OCLC 767055378

== LP records ==
=== LP Puchito (LPP) series ===
189. Olga Guillot (1954)
  Orquesta Hermanos Castro
  Manolo Castro, director
  LPP 101
190. Olga Guillot
  Olga Guillot y Orquesta Hermanos Castro
  Manolo Castro, director
  Side A:
  1. "En Nosotros"
    By Tania Castellanos
  2. "Soy Tuya"
    By Juan Bruno Tarraza
  3. "La Gloria Eres Tú"
    By Jose A. Mendez
  4. "Enamorada"
    Luis Yáñez
    Rolando Gómez
  Side B:
  1. "Por Que"
    By Pablo De Los Andes
  2. "Sin Mi"
    By Mario Clavell
  3. "Campanitas De Cristal"
    By Rafael Hernández
  4. "Dime"
    By Gonzalo Curiel (w&m)
  Puchito LPP 102
  Montilla LPP 102
  Matrices
  Side A: F8-OL-2982
  Side B: F8-OL-2983
191. René Cabel
  Canciones de Tony Fergo
  ... pseudonym of Antonio Fernández Gómez
  Orquesta Casino de la Playa
  René Cabel con la Orquesta Casino de la Playa en canciones de Tony Fergo
  Liduvino Pereira, director
  Recorded 1955, Havana
  Sides A & B:
  1. "Mi Loca Melodía"
  2. "Demasiado Tarde"
  3. "Anoche Fuiste Para Mí"
  4. "Ay Corazón"
  5. "Sonámbula Luna"
  6. "Yo quién Soy"
  7. "A qué Iglesia tu vas"
  8. "Dime tu Verdad"
  LPP 103
  Re-release:
  Nuria FS104 (Note: Nuria Records was based in Hialeah, Florida, and distributed Panamanian, Cuban, Colombian, and other Latin American music)
  Adding (from same session):
  9. "El Amor es un Arte"
  10. "Bastará un Adiós"
  11. "Tratame de Vos"
  12. "Algún Día"
192. Olga Guillot
  Castro Brothers Orchestra
  With Miguelito Valdés (1956)
  LPP 104
193. Pedro "Peruchin" Justiz Peruchín and His Piano Rhythm Accompaniment (1954)
  LPP 105
194. Trío Calaveras
  Raúl Prado
  Miguel Bermejo
  Pepe Saldivar
  Side A"
  1. "No Me Vuelvas A Ver"
    Chucho Navarro (w&m)
  2. "El Adiós al Soldado"
  3. "Pena Huasteca"
  4. "Pancho López"
  Side B"
  1. "De Un Mundo Raro"
  2. "El Preso No. 9"
  3. "Novia Envidiada"
  4. "El Caporal"
    Juan Mendoza (w&m)
  LPP 106

=== SP (Special Puchito) series ===
195. Dance Special
  Bailables
  Con Las Mejores Orquestas
  SP 101
196. Romantic Special
  Canciones Románticas Por Sus Mejores Interprutes
  SP 102
197. SP 103
  (same as MLP 565)
198. Guapacha
  With Mariano Mercerón and
  Mercerón y sus muchachos Pimienta
  Pío Leyva (vocals)
  Los Roberto (vocals)
  Side A:
  1. "Angelina"
  2. "Estás Mintiendo"
  3. "Lo Mismo Dá"
  4. "Solamente Una Vez"
  5. "Me Voy Para Jaronú"
  6. "La Noche Que Me Casé"
  Side B:
  1. "Cuando Canta el Cornetín"
  2. "Montuno Del Amor"
  3. "Si y No"
  4. "Lo Que Anoche Te Pedí"
  5. "Seranata en Haiti"
  6. "De Amor Nada Sé"
  SP 104
  Also released as MLP 590
199. Arsenio Rodríguez y Su Conjunto (1957)
  Arsenio
  SP 105 (the white label was issued post-Revolution nationalized Cuban issue, pre-EGREM; originally issued by Puchito in 1957 under the title Sabroso y caliente; MLP 586)
  Re-releases:
  Antilla (1990 & 1993)
  OCLC 27296827, 316111226
200. Banda Militar de Madrid
  Pasodobles Toreros
  SP 106
201. Chappottín y sus Estrellas (1957)
  Sabor Tropical
  Side A:
  1. "Quimbombo"
  2. "Canallon"
  3. "Rompe Saraguey"
  4. "Yo Si Como Candela"
  5. "Me Voy Contigo"
  6. "Ay Que Canuto"
  Side B:
  1. "Yo Soy Tiburon"
  2. "No Tiene Telaraña"
  3. "Que Se Fuñan"
  4. "Aunque Mami No Quiera"
  5. "Fidelina"
  6. "Nereyda"
  LP record – Puchito MLP 107 (1957)
  LP record – Antilla SP 107 (USA) (1965)
  LP record – Puchito Records Mfg. Co. Inc. SP 107 (USA)
  LP record – Carnaval LPC 3522 (Colombia)
  CD – P-Vine PCB-2143 (Japan) (1990)
  OCLC 53173421
202. Orquesta de Humberto Suarez
  Varadero
  SP 111
203. Coro de Madrigalistas
  Carmelina Rosel (1959)
  Villancicos Cubanos
  SP 112
204. La Gloria Matancera
  Cosas De Mi Cuba
  SP 116
  Matrix – Side A: ICD-324A
  Matrix – Side B: ICD-324B
205. Félix Reina y Orquesta Estrellas Cubanas
  Baila Mi Gente
  Recorded 1960
  Side A:
  1. "No Quiero Piedras En Mi Camino"
  2. "Llora Corazon"
  3. "Cositas De Amor"
  4. "La Chica Que Yo Sone"
  5. "Di Que Sí Me Quieres"
  6. "Vuela, Vuela La Paloma"
  Side B:
  1. "La Pachanga"
  2. "Un Telegrama"
  3. "Se Llama Cuba"
  4. "Baila Mi Gente"
  5. "Las Cositas De Mi China"
  6. "Ya No Vuelvas Mas"
  SP 118 LP
  Re-release: Adria AD 16 LP
206. Rolando Aguiló (trumpeter)
  y Su Orquesta
  Se Pone Sabroso
  Side A:
  1. "Por Tu Equivocacion"
  2. "Dulce Cha Cha Chá Para Ti"
  3. "El Gusanito Del Amor"
  4. "Montuno En Cha Cha Chá"
  5. "Changui En Trompeta"
  6. "La Rueda"
  Side B:
  1. "Gitana Mora"
  2. "Senores Bailadores"
  3. "Te Quise Inmensamente"
  4. "Que Quieres Amigo"
  5. "Masacote Oriental"
  6. "Se Pone Sabroso"
  SP 120 LP
207. Germán García y Carlos Díaz
  Cantan Para UD
  Con los Orquestas:
  Riverside
  Hermanos Castro, director
  Casino de la Playa
  Humberto Suárez, director
  Released 1960
  Side A:
  Germán García (vocalist)
  1. "Vagando"
  2. "Mi Colegiada"
  3. "Cuando No Se De Ti"
  4. "Entonces Para Que"
  5. "Hablo A Tu Corazón"
  6. "Tú Has Vuelto"
  Side B:
  Carlos Díaz (vocalist)
  1. "No Puedo Ser Feliz"
  2. "Mi Gloria"
  3. "Las Hojas Muertas"
  4. "No Te Importe Saber"
  5. "Soñar"
  6. "Corazón"
  SP 121
208. Villancicos Cubanos
  Coro de Madrigalistas
  Carmelina Rosell, soprano
  Marta Pérez, mezzo-soprano
  Manuel Ochoa, director
  Laurence Davis, piano
  Recorded at the end of 1959
  Released December 1959 Side A:
  1. "Una Nave Mercantil"
    Esteban Salas (w&m)"
  2. "Pues Logra Ya"
    Esteban Salas (w&m)"
  3. "Guíame a Belén"
    Olga de Blanck (music)
    Maria Julia Casanova (words)
  4. "Villancico Criollo"
    Edgardo Martín
    Dora Carvajal (words)
  5. "Canción al Niño Jesús"
    Harold Gramatges (music)
    G. Diego (words)
  6. "Tríptico de Villancicos Cubanos"
    César Pérez Sentenat (w&m)
    1. "Navidad Guajira"
    2. "Al Niño le Gusta el Son"
    3. "Flor de Pascua Bendita"
    Side B:
    1. "Son de Navidad"
      Gisela Hernández (w&m)
    2. "Palmas Reales
      Gisela Hernández (music)
      Concha Méndez (words)
    3. "Adiós, Belenista"
      Roberto Marín (w&m)
    4. "Brazo de mi cruz"
      Carlo Borbolla (music)
      With Miguel del Castillo (violin)
    5. "He Bajao Los Cerros"
      Carlo Borbolla (music)
    6. "Ofrenda de un Guajirito"
      Hermano Alfredo Gabriel (w&m)
      (aka Alfredo Morales, FSC)
    7. "Guajiro Canta"
      Mercedes Pedroso de Douglas (w&m)
    8. "Mensaje de Navidad"
      Carmelina Rosell (w&m)
    SP 122 LP
    Re-issued in Miami as Puchito 606
    OCLC 34368987
209. Jorge Ortega
  y su Orquesta
  Trópico
  SP 126
210. Desfile De Estrellas (Various Artists)
  Side A:
  1. "Tu Boda"
    Trío Delfines (performers)
    (i) Jesús Oloarte García
    (ii) José Oloarte García
    (iii) Agustin Aguilar Reynoso
    Adolfo Domínguez Salas (w&m)
  2. "Comunicando"
    Olga Guillot (performer)
    Luis Palomar Dapena (words)
    Segovia (pseudonym of
    Antonio López-Quiroga) (music)
  3. "Vuela, Vuela La Paloma"
    Orquesta Estrellas Cubanas
    Félix Reina (w&m)
  4. "Chino No Son Bobo"
    Anibal de Mar y Zoila Gómez
    Chanito Isidrón (w&m)
  5. "Aquel Rosario Blanco"
    Amelita Frades (performer)
  6. "La Pachanga"
    Eduardo Davidson (music)
  Side B:
  1. "Vete Di Mí"
    Olga Guillot (performer)
    Virgilio Expósito (music)
    Homero Expósito (words)
  2. "El Fantasma Del Circo"
    Orquesta Sensación
    Julio Gutiérrez (arranger)
    Mark Anthony (pseudonym of Tony Hatch) (w&m)
  3. "Ódiame"
    Trío Servando Díaz
  4. "Inolvidable" y "Conozco a Los Dos"
    1st song: Julio Gutiérrez (w&m)
    2nd song: Pablo Valdés Hernández (w&m)
    Berto González (performer)
  5. "La Viuda Del Muerto"
    Eduardo Davidson (w&m)
  6. "Bajo Un Palmar" ("Under A Palm Tree")
    Orquesta Riverside
    Pedro Flores (w&m)
  Impresora Cubana de Discos
  Distribuidor: Gorís Shop
  SP 129
  OCLC 882979398

=== Série Popular ===
211. Orquesta Sensación
  Rolando Valdés, director
  Cha Cha Chá de Cuba (1956)
  Side A:
  1. "Rico Vacilon"
  2. "Los Tamalitos De Olga"
  3. "La Mulata Chanela"
  4. "Caumbia"
  Side B:
  1. "Cero Codazos Cero Cabezazos"
  2. "Seven Boys"
  3. "La Cumbancha"
  4. "Aprendiendo El Cha-Cha-Chá"
  Puchito: LPS 1 (Cuba)
  On Label: LPX:102
  On Sleeve: LPS 1
  Montilla: LPS-1 (Spain)
  Montilla: 26 004 (France)
  Hispavox (Madrid) Matrix – Side A: FB-OL-0872
  Matrix – Side B: FB-OL-0873
  OCLC 431410073

=== MLP series ===
212. Leopoldo Fernández
  Estrellas del Escambray Liborio (Parodia de Pinocho)
  MLP 470 LP
213. Orquesta Hermanos Castro
  With Carlos Díaz
  and Juan Polanco
  Strictly For Dancing
  Side A:
  1. "Cayetano Baila"
    Parmenio Salazar Jústiz (w&m)
  2. "Chachacha del Angel"
    Antonio Castro (w&m)
  3. "Mambo Gitano"
    By José Mora
  4. "San Antonio"
    Juan Polanco (w&m)
  5. "Amanecer Cubano"
    Julio Blanco Léonard (w&m)
  6. "Mi Nuevo Ritmo"
    Raúl Aguilar (w&m)
  Side B:
  1. "Batanga a la Española"
    José Urfé (w&m)
  2. "La basura"
    Jorge Zamora Montalvo
  3. "La luna se Divorció"
    Raúl Aguilar
  4. "Adiós Negrita"
    Alcadio (Pipi) Franco (w&m)
  5. "Un Chivirico Más"
    Ramón Márquez (w&m)
  6. "Italian boy"
    Enrique Bonne (w&m)
  MLP 501
  Re-issue
  Montilla MLP 501
  Matrix – Side A: F8-OP-3354
  Matrix – Side B: F8-OP-3355
  Hispavox (Madrid)
  OCLC 431410372
214. Cuban-Rhythms (1958)
  Pantaleón Pérez Prado
  (brother of Dámaso Pérez Prado)
  Y su Orquesta de Baile
  Side A:
  1. "Mambo Candombe"
  2. "Elysel Mambo"
  3. "No me Hagas Cosquillitas"
  4. "Muchachita"
  5. "Tumbae"
  6. "Todos Qeuremos Mas"
  7. "Mambo del Estudiante"
  Side B:
  1. "Bambatunga"
  2. "Mambo Malagueño"
  3. "Nocturnando"
  4. "Cerezo Rosa"
    ("Cheery Pink and Apple Blossom White")
  5. "Swing y Mambo"
  6. "Me lo dijo Adela"
  7. "Rosina"
  MLP 502 Hi-Fi LP OCLC 32029524
  Also released in 1957 on:
  Hispavox: Serie Puchito
  Montilla 502
  Montilla matrix – Side A: F8-OP-8201
  Montilla matrix – Side B: F8-OP-8202
  OCLC 431459257
215. Napoleón and Orquesta Dominicana
  Let's Do The Merengue
  Napoleón Zayas (de)
  MLP 503 LP
  Re-releases:
  Montilla 26002
  Toreador T 515
  OCLC 753621086, 23837255, 70915931
216. Orquesta Sensación (1956)
  Cha Cha Chá
  MLP 504 LP
  OCLC 6060435
217. Manolo Álvarez Mera
  Released 1957
  Manolo Álvarez-Mera (bel canto tenor)
  Orquesta Bajo
  Roberto Valdés Arnau, director
  Side A:
  1. "Júrame"
    ("Swear")
    (audio on YouTube)
    By María Grever
  2. "Marta"
    (audio on YouTube)
    By Moisés Simons
  3. "No Niegues que me quisistes"
    ("Do Not Deny That You Wanted Me")
    (audio on YouTube)
    By Jorge del Moral
  4. "Siempre en Mi Corazón"
    ("Always In My Heart")
    (1st audio on YouTube, 2nd audio on YouTube, 3rd audio on YouTube)
    By Ernesto Lecuona
  5. "No Puedo ser feliz"
    ("I Can Not Be Happy")
    (audio on YouTube
    By Adolfo Guzmán
  Side B:
  1. "Torna a Sorriento"
    ("Come Back to Sorrento")
    By Ernesto De Curtis
  2. "Mattinatta"
    ("Morning")
    (audio on YouTube)
    By Ruggero Leoncavallo
  3. "Core 'ngrato"
    ("Ingrate Heart")
    By Salvatore Cardillo &
    Riccardo Cordiferro
  4. "La donna è mobile"
    ("Women Are Flighty")
    By Verdi
  5. "Estrellita"
    ("Little Star")
    By Manuel Ponce
  Puchitio MLP 505 LP (196?)
  OCLC 913818568
218. Ataúlfo Alves e Suas Pastoras
  Jorge Fernández Conjunto e Coros
  Festival in Brazil
  MLP 506 LP
  OCLC 812555690
219. Bola Sete y Su Conjunto
  Carnival in Rio
  Recorded in 1958 in Spain during his European tour
  MLP 507 LP
220. Abelardo Barroso
  Orquesta Sensación
  Cha Cha Chá
  MLP 508 LP
  Re-release
  World Circuit WCV-088
  OCLC 892897257
221. Olga Guillot
  Castro Brothers Orchestra
  Olga Guillot
  MLP 509 LP
222. Napoleon And His Orchestra
  Ciudad
  MLP 510 LP
223. Ernesto Lecuona, piano
  Ernesto Lecuona al Piano Con Orquesta y Sus Interpretes
  Compositions of Ernesto Lecuona
  Includes singer
  Rosa Elena Miró
  MLP 511 LP
  (this was Lecuona's last recording)
  Re-issue:
  Dardo Recordings – JPD-3646
  OCLC 57061312
224. Cha Cha Chá
  Orquesta Melodías Del 40
  Recorded in Cuba buy Jesús Gorís
  Manufactured by Impresora Cubana de Discos, S. A., Havana Side A:
  1. "Seis Lindas Cubanas"
    Julio Pérez
    Guillermo Castillo García
  2. "Caprichito de Verdad"
    Julián Fiallo (w&m)
  3. "Tunas Bayamo"
    Regino Frontela Fraga (w&m)
  4. "El Niño Prodigio"
    Regino Frontela Fraga (w&m)
  5. "Montuno Favorito"
    José "Roquilli" Herrera (w&m)
  6. "Se Va Conmigo"
    Adolfo Peñalver (w&m)
  Side B:
  1. "Me Voy Pa' Morón"
    José "Roquilli" Herrera (w&m)
  2. "Cruel Tomento"
    Julián Fiallo García (w&m)
  3. "Igualita Que La Habana"
    Rey Díaz Calvet
  4. "El Cachín Cachumba"
    By Francisco Rubio
  5. "Estás Equivocada"
    Osvaldo Farrés (w&m)
  6. "Prisionero"
    Julián Fiallo (w&m)
  Puchito MLP-512
  Re-released as:
  Me Voy Pa' Morón
  Adria AP 5
  Matrix – Side A: AP-5-A
  Matrix – Side F: AP-5-B
  Manufactured & distributed by
  Armada & Rodriguez Of Florida, Inc.
  Also distributed as:
  Cha Cha Chá by Montilla 26.009 (France)
  OCLC 962264180, 913818569, 41124746
225. Orquesta Riverside
  Pedro Vila, conductor
  Ritmos De Cuba
  MLP 513 LP
226. Rosita Fornés y
  Armando Bianchi
  (né Armando Figueroa Botempol)
  Con la Orquesta Riverside
  Pedro Vila, director
  Recorded in 1959
  Side A:
  1. "A Mí Nada Me Importa"
    Alberto Barberis (w&m)
  2. "Luna de Miel"
    Julio Blanco Léonard (w&m)
  3. "Gitanilla Morena"
    Augusto Algueró Dasca (w&m)
  4. "Esta Noche Me Emborracho"
    Enrique Santos Discépolo (w&m)
  5. "Pregúntale a la Luna"
    Rafael Cortijo Verdejo (w&m)
  6. "Así Así"
    Mario Fernández Porta (w&m)
    Julio Gutiérrez (arrangement)
  Side B:
  1. "No Me Olvides Nunca"
    Title from the 1956 Mexican film
    No Me Olvides Nunca
  2. "Como Dos Barquitos"
    Antonio Quintero Ramírez (words)
    Rafael de León (words)
    Manuel Quiroga (music)
  3. "Yo Quiero Hacerte Una Canción"
    Bobby Collazo
    (Roberto Cecilio Collazo Peña) (w&m & arr.)
  4. "Tuya"
    Alberto Barberis (w&m)
  5. "Mi Chiquita es un Trueno"
  6. "Estoy en el Cielo"
    Neno González
  MLP 514 LP
  Re-issue
  Uniko Records 5140 (CD) (Pharr, Texas)
227. Olga Guillot; Orquesta Riverside
  Pedro Vila, director (1956)
  Romance y Melodía
  MLP 515 LP
228. Roberto Faz y Su Conjunto Casino
  Side A:
  1. "Sabrosona"
  2. "Suena tu Bongo"
  3. "Pinchame Con Tenedor"
  4. "Cachirulo"
  5. "Bayamo y El Cha Cha Chá"
  6. "Si Los Rumberos Me Llaman"
  Side B:
  1. "El Bombon de Elena"
  2. "Oriente Cuna Florida"
  3. "La Tijera"
  4. "Jovellanos"
  5. "Los Cabezones"
  6. "Rumba de Cuba"
  MLP 516 LP
  Also released as:
  Sabrosona (title)
  (RE) Antilla AP 8 (USA) (1956)
  (CD) Antilla 8 (USA) (19??)
  (RE) Adria AP 8 (USA) (19??)
  OCLC 53302548
229. Everardo Ordaz
  Piano Mágico
  Released 1956
  With rhythm accompaniment
  MLP 517 LP
  OCLC 49519780
230. Trío Calaveras
  Side A:
  1. "No Me Vuelvas A Ver"
    By Chucho Navarro
  2. "El Adios Al Soldado"
    By Mosé M. Caravbito
  3. "Pena Huasteca"
    Hermanos Samperio
  4. "Pancho Lopez"
    By Cole, Guerrero (special lyrics), Blackburn (original words), George Bruns (music)
  5. "Paloma Negra"
    By Tomás Méndez
  6. "La Cama De Piedra"
    By Cuco Sánchez
  Side B:
  1. "De Un Mundo Raro"
    By José Alfredo Jiménez
  2. "El Preso N° 9"
    By Hermanos Santoral
  3. "Novia Envidiada"
    By Ricardo Palmerín
  4. "El Caporal"
    By Juan Mendoza
  5. "La Noche y Tu"
    By Rubén Fuentes
  6. "De Tanto Amar"
    By José Alfredo Jiménez
  MLP 518 LP
  OCLC 173137384
231. Adolfo Guzmán
  Cita con René Cabel
  Orquesta Riverside
  Adolfo Guzmán, director
  Side A:
  1. "Peregrina"
    By Ricardo Palmerín
  2. "Franqueza"
    By Chelo Velázquez
  3. "La Barca"
    By Roberto Cantoral
  4. "Nunca, Nunca, Nunca"
    By Tata Nacho
  5. "El Amor, Algo Divino"
    By Adolfo Guzmán
  6. "Santa"
    By Agustín Lara
  Side B:
  1. "El Reloj"
    By Roberto Cantoral
  2. "Te Me Olvidas"
    By Vicente Garrido
  3. "Porque Tu Me Acostumbraste"
    By Frank Domínguez
  4. "Nuestro Idilio"
    By Adolfo Guzmán
  5. "Mujer"
    By Agustín Lara
  6. "Cuéntame Tus Penas De Amor"
    By Adolfo Guzmán
  MLP 519
  Re-release:
  Antilla MLP 568 LP
  OCLC 918927651
  LCCN 2015-625117
232. Fajardo, flute, with orchestra
  Arrangements and musical direction by Rodrigo Prats
  Danzones Completos – Para Bailar (Instrumentales), Vol. 1
  LP – Puchito MLP 520
  Re-release:
  LP – Antilla, Antilla 566, A-566 (USA)
  LP – Puchito MLP-566 (USA)
  LP – Antilla 566 (Venezuela)
  CD – Antilla CD-566 (mfg. by Disque Améric)
  OCLC 28160264
233. Orquesta Riverside
  Una Noche En Tropicana
  Side A:
  1. "Vereda Tropical"
    Gonzalo Curiel (w&m)
  2. "A Mi Mayarí"
    Ulises Meléndez (w&m)
  3. "Naricita Fría"
    Juanito Márquez (w&m)
  4. "¿Por Qué No Ha De Ser?"
    Juan Lockward (w&m)
  5. "Oye Como Gozo, Mamá"
    Bebo Valdés (w&m)
  6. "Mañana por la Mañana"
  Side B:
  1. "Te Adoraré Más y Más"
    Pedro "Pituko" Rigual (w&m)
  2. "Mulata Guapachá"
    Luis Yáñez
    Rolando Gómez
  3. "Arrivederci, Roma"
    Renato Rascel (music)
    Pietro Garinei (words)
    Sandro Giovannini (words)
  4. "Estás En Mí"
    Bobin Echevarría (w&m)
  5. "Blancas Azucenas"
    Pedro Flores (w&m) "Cha Cha Chá de Los Perros"
    F. Bejarano
  MLP 521 LP
  OCLC 764298339
234. Celina y Reutilio (1975)
  (Reutilio Domínguez)
  Santa Bárbara
  Side A:
  1. "A Santa Bárbara" ("Que Viva Changó")
  2. "La Reina Del Mar"
  3. "El 17" ("San Lázaro")
  4. "Oye Mi Olelolei"
  5. "El Hijo de Elegua"
  Side B:
  1. "La Caridad Del Cobre"
  2. "El Rey Del Mundo"
  3. "Perdoname Bongo"
  4. "Rumba Omelenko"
  5. "El Bururú"
  Antilla ANT-31 (USA)
  Antilla AP-31 (USA) (1975)
  CD, Antilla CD-31 (USA)
  LP, Adria AP 31 (USA)
  OCLC 37368129
235. Leo Rosa
  (né Kenneth W. Rosa)
  (Rosa went on to become a chiropractor in The Bronx)
  Ritmos Trópicales con Leo Rosa su Piano y Ritmo
  Released in 1957
  MLP 522
  Re-released as
  Piano Magico
  Adria AP 17 LP (USA)
236. Napoleon Dihmes
  Romance Italiano
  En La Voz de
  Orquesta de Rey Díaz Calvet
  MLP 523
  Re-release:
  Adria AP 44
237. Walfrido Guevara y Su Orquesta
  Chachareando el Cuplé
  Sides A & B:
  1. "Clavelitos"
    José Juan Cadenas (words)
    Joaquín Valverde (music)
  2. "Balancé"
    Ernesto Tecglen (words)
    Ricardo Yust (music)
  3. "Rosa de Madrid"
    José Soriano (words)
    Luis Barta (music)
  4. "Nena"
    By Joaquín Zamacois
  5. "Mala Entraña"
    By Juan Martínez Abades
  6. "Ven y Ven"
    Álvaro Retana (words)
    Rafael Gómez (music)
  7. "La Violetera"
    Eduardo Montesinos (words)
    José Padilla (music)
  8. "La nieta de Carmen"
    Eduardo Montesinos (words)
    Manuel Font de Anta (music)
  9. "Flor de Té"
    Juan Martínez Abades
  10. "Sus Pícaros Ojos"
    Eduardo Montesinos (words)
    Vicente Quirós (music)
    Francisco Alonso (music)
  11. "Agua Que No Has de Beber"
    Juan Martínez Abades
  12. "Tápame"
    Antonio López Monís (words)
    Ricardo Yust (music)
  MLP 524
  Also released as:
  Puchitio MLP 572
238. Olga Guillot
  Orchestra de José Sabre Marroquín
  MLP 525 LP
239. Intimidades Con Olga Guillot (1958) Arrangements & musical direction by
  René Touzet & Curteto Faxas
  Sides A:
  1. "Que Nadie Se Entere"
  2. "Como Te Atreves"
  3. "Estuve Pensando"
  4. "No Te Importe Saber"
  5. "Raro Hechizo"
  6. "Que Emoción"
  Sides B:
  1. "No Vale La Pena"
  2. "La Noche de Anoche"
  3. "Tan Lejos y Sin Embargo Te Quiero"
  4. "No, Ya No Te Puedo Amar"
  5. "Tuya"
  6. "Cuando Tu Quieras"
  MLP 526 LP
240. Pototo & Filomeno & their Conjunto (1957)
  Accompanied by the Orquesta Melodías del 40
  Side A:
  1. "Carta de Mamita"
    Leopoldo Fernández
  2. "Ahorita Va'llove"
    Leopoldo Fernández
  3. "En El Prescinto"
  4. "No Mojen A La Materia"
    Zoila Gómez
  5. "Inscripcion De Nacimiento"
    Leopoldo Fernández
  6. "Boniatillo"
    Leopoldo Fernández
  Side B:
  1. "Mano A Mano"
    José Razzano (music)
    Carlos Gardel (music)
    Celedonio Flores (words)
  2. "Yo Vendo Unos Ojos Negros"
    ("Some Black-Eyed Peas for Sale")
    (Pregón)
    Pablo Ara Lucena (w&m)
  3. "Échame a Mi La Culpa"
    José Ángel Espinoza (music)
    Leopoldo Fernández (words)
  4. "De Esta Nube No Me Bajo Yo"
    Senén Suárez
  5. "El Hijo Del Penal"
  6. "Ensename Bien Tus Pescadores"
    Leopoldo Fernández
  MLP 528 LP
  Re-release
  Aro R-105
  OCLC 956758078
241. Orquesta Riverside (1957)
  Baile Con La Orquesta Riverside
  Side A:
  1. "Pensamiento"
  2. "Ramona"
  3. "Avenida 486"
  4. "A La Rigola"
  5. "Amor Amor"
  6. "Que Bueno Esta El Ambiente"
  Side B:
  1. "En Un Pueblito Español"
  2. "Cuando Ya No Me Quieras"
  3. "Amapola"
  4. "Y Tu Que Has Hecho"
  5. "Todo En Ti"
  6. "Frenesi"
  Puchito MLP 529 (Cuba) (1957)
  P-Vine Records PCD-2365 (Japan) (1992)
  Dardo Recordings JPD-3647 (United States) (1982)
242. Olga Guillot (1958)
  Creaciones de la Guillot
  MLP 530 LP
243. Fajardo, flute; with orchestra
  Danzones Completos – Para Bailar (Instrumentales), Vol. 2
  Arrangements and musical direction by Rodrigo Prats
  Other musicians include: Jesus López (Piano), Israel "Cachao" López (bass guitar), Ulpiano Díaz (timbales)
  Side A:
  1. "Una Rosa De Francia"
  2. "Penicilina"
  3. "El Cangrejito"
  4. "Ferrocarril Central"
  5. "Amalia Batista"
  Side B:
  1. "El Cisne Blanco"
  2. "Una Taza De Arroz"
  3. "Meditacion"
  4. "Si Me Pides El Pescao"
  5. "Liceo Del Pilar"
  MLP 531 LP
  Re-releases
  Puchito MLP 569
  Antilla MLP 569
  Funny LPF 544 (Serie Coleccionista)
  OCLC 764295901
244. Carlos Campos and his Orchestra
  Musica Maestro
  MLP 532 LP
245. Carlos Campos y Su Orquesta
  Danzones en alta Fideldad
  MLP 535 LP
  Re-release
  Musart D-346 (Mexico)
  OCLC 73516554
246. Olga Guillot
  Humberto Suárez, music director (1959)
  Olga en Mexico
  MLP 538 LP
247. Pototo & Filomeno (1959)
  Ensalada Rebelde
  Accompanied by the Orquesta Melodías del 40
  Recorded in Cuba by Jesús Gorís
  Manufactured by Impresora Cubana de Discos, S.A., Havana
  ICD-189 A:
  1. "Estrella Del Escambray"
  2. "Ensalada Rebelde"
  3. "A Toda Luz"
  4. "Pico Un Pan"
  5. "Enciéndeme la Vela"
  6. "Arrollando Va"
  ICD-189 B:
  1. "Una Carta De Fidel"
  2. "Liborio"
  3. "De Rodillas Para Que?"
  4. "Lo Que Lleva El Satelite"
  5. "Chilindron De Jicotea"
  6. "El Jabonero"
  Matrix: ICD-189-A JP MLP-540
  Matrix: ICD-189-B JP MLP-540
  MLP 540 LP
248. Orquesta Riverside
  Tito Gómez, vocal (1959)
  Cha-Hua-Hua
  MLP 541 LP
249. Orquesta Sensación (1962)
  Tiene Sabor
  Releases LP:
  Puchito MLP 542 (Cuba) (1959)
  Puchito MPL 542 (Cuba) (1962)
  Adria AP 11 (USA)
  Antilla AP 11 (USA)
250. Agustín Lara
  Agustín Lara
  MLP 543 LP
251. Julio Cueva and His Orchestra
  Defiendete
  MLP 550 LP
252. Freddy
  Orchestra directed by Humberto Suárez
  Released 1960
  Side A:
  1. "El Hombre Que yo Amé"
    (audio on YouTube) George Gershwin (music)
    Ira Gershwin (words)
  2. "Tengo"
    Gabriel Ruiz (w&m)
  3. "La Cíta"
    Marta Valdés (w&m)
  4. "Noche y Día"
    Cole Porter (w&m)
  5. "Vivamos Hoy"
    Wilfredo Riquelme
    (né Wilfredo Antonio Riquelme Pérez) (w&m)
  6. "Freddy"
    Ela O’Farrill (w&m)
  Side B:
  1. "Noche de Ronda"
    (audio on YouTube)
    Agustín Lara (w&m)
  2. "Tengo que Decirte"
    Rafael Pedraza (w&m)
  3. "Debí Llorar"
    Piloto y Vera (w&m)
    (Giraldo Piloto)
    (Alberto Vera Morúa)
  4. "Sombras y Más Sombras"
    Humberto Suárez (w&m)
  5. "Gracias, Mi Amor"
    Jesús Faneity (aka Rudy J. Fanneity)
  6. "Bésame Mucho"
    Consuelo Velázquez (w&m)
  MLP 552 LP
  Re-issued as:
  La Voz Del Sentimiento
  Antilla 50 (CD) (USA)
  Mélodie 79599-2 (CD) (France) (1995)
  François Xavier-Gomez (Mélodie liner notes)
  And as:
  Noche y Día con ... Freddy
  Adria AP 50 LP
  And as:
  Ella Cantaba Boleros
  ARC Records RF-994, SIN ABRIR (CD) (1998)
  And under other titles by:
  Big World (1995)
  Música del Sol MSCD-7201 (1998) (Barcelona)
  OCLC 57061311, 716232187, 803414283
253. Manolo Álvarez Mera
  Gran Orquesta
  Roberto Valdés Arnau, director
  Canciones Cubanas (Vol.2)
  MLP 553 LP
  OCLC 53980565, 443637670
254. Olga Guillot (1960)
  Arranged & directed by Humberto Suarez
  Olga de Cuba
  MLP 555 LP
255. Orquesta Sensación
  Danzón-Cha
  MLP 557 LP
256. Orquesta Sensación
  Danzón-Cha
  MLP 558 LP
257. Olga Guillot (1960)
  Comunicando
  MLP 559 LP
258. Pototo & Filomeno (1960) y
  Nananina y Salmolledo
  Con Melodías del 40
  Yo Pico Un Pan ...
  MLP 561 LP
259. Conroy (Conrado) Wilson & His Combo
  Guitarra Magica (1963)
  Side A:
  1. "El Manisero"
  2. "Hojas Muertas"
  3. "Calypso Guapacha"
  4. "Como Me Gustan"
  5. "El Tercer Hombre" from the 1949 film
    The Third Man
  6. "Que Suave"
    (audio on YouTube)
  Side B:
  1. "Ojos Negros"
  2. "Verano De Amor"
  3. "Siete Muchachitas Alla Atras Sentadas"
  4. "Nunca Sabre"
  5. "ABC Blues"
  6. "Cerveza"
  MLP 563 LP
  English title release:
  Magic Guitar
  (with Latin Twist and Cuban Music)
  MLP 560 LP
  (MLP 560 is used for another album, see below)
260. Carlos Campos y Su Orquesta
  El Campeon
  MLP 560 LP
  (MLP 560 is used for another album, see above)
261. Olga Guillot (1963)
  Lo Mejor de Olga Guillot
  MLP 564 LP
262. Ñico Membiela y Su Orquesta
  Joaquín Mendível, director
  Que Viva El Amor
  MLP 566 LP
263. Navidades Cubanas Libres
  Side A:
  1. "Blanca Navidad"
    Olga Guillot (vocalist)
  2. "El Manisero"
    Moisés Simons (music)
    Barroso y la Sensación
  3. "Veinte Años"
    María Teresa Vera (music)
    Featuring María Teresa Vera
  4. "Lechón y Guanajo"
    Julio Cueva (w&m)
    Julio Cueva y Su Orquesta
  5. "Rompiendo la Rutina"
    Aniceto Díaz (w&m)
    Paulina Álvarez y Su Típica Nacional
    Gilberto Valdés, director
  6. "Yayabo"
    Antonio Sánchez Reyes (w&m)
    Orquesta Riverside
  7. "Himno Nacional Cubano"
    Perucho Figueredo (w&m)
    Banda Munícipal y Coro
  Side B:
  1. "Noche de Paz"
    Olga Guillot (vocalist)
  2. "Noche Cubana"
    César Portillo de la Luz (w&m)
    Pepe Reyes (né José Antonio Reyes Carbonell) (vocalist) y
    Armando Romeu, Jr., y Su Orquesta
  3. "Papá Montero"
    Sexteto Habanero
  4. "Amarga Navidad"
    José Alfredo Jiménez (w&m)
    Dúo Landín-Rivero
  5. "Tres Lindas Cubanas"
    Guillermo Castillo García (w&m)
    Arranged by Antonio María Romeu
    Gran Orquesta Típica Nacional
    Gilberto Valdés (director)
    (see orquesta típica)
  6. "Poutpurri Antuigo"
    Julio Cueva y Su Orquesta
  7. "Himno Nacional Cubano"
    Perucho Figueredo (music)
    (instrumental)
    Banda Munícipal
  MLP 570 LP
  Re-released as Himno Nacional Cubano e
  Himno Invasor, adding a 3^{rd} version of
  "Himno Nacional Cubano"
  Antilla JPD-3651
  OCLC 753620310
264. Carlos Puebla y Sus Tradicionales
  Canciones en las Trincheras
  LD 570 LP
265. Puchito MLP 572
  (same as MLP 524)
266. Barroso y la Sensación
  Guajiro de Cunagua
  MLP 573 LP
  OCLC 764431953, 316125430, 890656221
267. César Gonzmart and His Magic Violins (1963)
  A Night at the Columbia (Note: "Cesar Gonzmart, proprietor, and two guests posed at table with wine in the Columbia Restaurant, 2117 East Broadway Street, Tampa, Florida," Tampa–Hillsborough County Public Library System (1993); OCLC 28011032Photo negative N° 40136, taken December 12, 1936.)
  Jose Forns, vocal
  Miguel Bodegas, vocal
  Side A:
  1. "El Relicario"
  2. "Doce Cascabeles"
  3. "Ojos Negros" ("Black Eyes")
  4. "Quiéreme Mucho" ("Yours")
  5. "Si Vas a Calatayud"
  6. "Tico-Tico"
  Side B:
  1. "Tengo, Tengo, Tengo"
  2. "Cuando, Cuando, Cuando"
  3. "Monisma" ("Monisima")
  4. "Hava Nageela"
  5. "Lisbon Antigua"
  6. "Madamoiselle de Paris"
  MLP 574 LP
  OCLC 18252852
268. César Gonzmart and His Magic Violins
  Pepe Urquiaga, vocals (1963)
  Dining at the Columbia Side A:
  1. "La Paloma"
  2. "Marta"
  3. "So in Love"
  4. "Estas En Mi Corazon"
  5. "Torna a Surriento"
  6. "Te Quiero Dijiste" by María Grever
  Side B:
  1. "Morena"
  2. "Noche Azul"
  3. "Only Make Believe"
  4. "Hojas Muertas" ("Autumn Leaves")
  5. "Noche De Ronda"
  6. "Guitarra Romana"
  MLP 576 LP
  OCLC 86223155
269. Abelardo Barroso
  Barroso y La Sensación
  MLP 579 LP
270. Olga Guillot (1964)
  Miguelito Valdes
  El Cuarteto Los Ruffinos
  La Insuperable Olga
  MLP 580 LP
271. Amparo Garrido
  At the Columbia
  With Panchito Calimano
  And his Combo
  Ole!
  Side A:
  1. "Olé Tus Lunares"
    By Augusto Algueró? (words)
    Segovia (pseudonym of
    Antonio López-Quiroga) (music)
  2. "La Cancion Del Ole"
    Quintero, Quiroga, León
    (Antonio Quintero)
    (Rafael de León)
    (Quiroga)
  3. "Ola, Ola, Ola: Mare Nostrum"
    Santiago Guardia Moreu (words)
    Joaquin Gasa (words) (words)
    Augusto Algueró (music)
  4. "Tanto Tienes, Tanto Vales"
    Antonio Quintero (words)
    Rafael de León (words)
    Quiroga (music)
  5. "Palito De Ron"
    Xandro Valerio (words)
    José Antonio Ochaíta (words)
    Juan Solano Pedrero (music)
  6. "Estando contigo"
    Antonio Guijarro Campoy (words)
    Augusto Algueró (music)
  Side B:
  1. "Te Lo Juro Yo"
    Rafael de León (words)
    Quiroga (music)
  2. "El Berebito"
    Blanca Flores (pseudonym of
    Consuelo Losada Sánchez) (words)
    Ferman or Fernán or Fermán or
    Fermín or Fernín (words)
    Juan Verdugo Torres (words)
    Genaro Monreal Lacosta (music)
  3. "Tu A Mi Me Perteneces"
    Trini Márquez (pseudonym of
    Albertina Márquez) (w&m)
  4. "Si No Fueras Tú"
    José Villafranca (words)
    Segovia (pseudonym of
    Antonio López-Quiroga) (music)
  5. "Tómbola"
    Antonio Guijarro Campoy (words)
    Augusto Algueró (music)
    From the 1962 film
    Tómbola
  6. "Esperanza"
    Ramón Cabrera Argotes (w&m)
  MLP 582 LP
  OCLC 37266725, 62231583
272. Panchito Calimano (1957)
  Báilame el Dengue
  MLP 583 LP
273. Danzones de Alto Rango
  Gran Orquesta Típica Integrada Por 64 Profesores
  Paulina Álvarez (vocalist); José Fajardo (flute); Cachao (bass); Enrique Jorrín, Pedrito Hernández, Félix Reina, Cheo Belén Puig (violins); José Antonio Díaz (piano); Ulpiano Díaz (flute, timbales); Gilberto Valdés (director) – assisted by Rodrigo Prats and Odilio Urfé
  (see orquesta típica & danzón)
  Side A:
  1. "Tres Lindas Cubanas"
    Danzón, Antonio María Romeu y Guillermo Castillo
  2. "Rompiendo la Rutina"
    Danzonete, Aniceto Díaz
    Paulina Álvarez (vocalist)
  3. "Que Pollos"
    Danzón, Enrique Jorrín
  4. "Concierto" ("en Varsovia")
    Danzón, Pedrito Hernández
  5. "Mambo Típico"
    Mambo, Gilberto Valdés Boitel
  Side B:
  1. "Silver Moon"
    Danzón, Félix Reina
  2. "Viñales"
    Danzón, Gilberto Valdés Boitel
  3. "Meditación"
    Danzón, Cheo Belén Puig
  4. "Preludio en mi Menor"
    Danzón, Pedrito Hernández
  5. "Amalia Batista"
    Danzón, Rodrigo Prats
  MLP 585
274. Arsenio Rodríguez y Su Conjunto (1957)
  Sabroso y Caliente
  MLP 586 LP
  Re-issues
  Rumba Records, Antilla LP-ANT-586, MLP-586 (Venezuela) (1978)
  Sabroso y Caliente CD Antilla CD-586 (USA) (1982)
  Sabroso y Caliente LP Antilla MLP-586 (USA) (1982)
  Arsenio Puchito (white label) SP 105
  OCLC 27296827
275. René Cabel, tenor
  Exitos de René Cabel
  Side A:
  1. "Siete Noche"
  2. "Vagabundo"
  3. "Cada vez Más"
  4. "Que Será, Que Será, Que Será"
  5. "Porque Tú Me Acostumbraste"
  6. "Que Injusticia"
  Side B:
  1. "Una Mujer"
  2. "Y Dicen Que Soy Barracho"
  3. "Mi Eterna Canción"
    Billo Frómeta (w&m)
  4. "Volveré"
  5. "Vals de Los Quince"
  6. "Vals de Los Quince" (instrumental)
  MLP 589 LP
  OCLC 53315734
276. A Bailar con
  Mariano Mercerón y sus
  Muchachos Pimienta
  MLP 590
  Also released as SP 104
  (see SP Series)
277. Bruca Maniguá
  Orquesta Sensación y Abelardo Barroso
  Rolando Valdés (director, güiro, and chorus), Abelardo Barroso (featured vocalist), Juan Pablo Miranda (flute), Ovidio Pérez Pinto y Lauri (violins), Jesús Esquizarrosa (timbales), Carlos Zulueta (piano), Miguel "El Piche" Santa Cruz (conga), Ta-Benito (née Mario Varona) (chorus), Luis Donald (chorus), Eddy Álvarez (né Eduardo Álvarez) (chorus), Alejandro "El Negro" Vivar (trumpet), Enemelio Jiménez (alto sax), Generoso "El Tojo" Jiménez (trombone) (brother of Enemelio)
  Sides A & B:
  1. "Bruca Maniguá"
    Arsenio Rodríguez
  2. "El Cangrejito"
    Rosendo Ruíz
  3. "San Luisera"
    Manuel Poveda Palay (w&m)
  4. "El Fantasma del Circo"
    Julio Gutiérrez (arranger)
    Mark Anthony (pseudonym of Tony Hatch) (w&m)
  5. "Guajiras de Hoy"
    Rolando Valdés
  6. "La mulata Chanela"
    Rolando Valdés
    Aléncar
    Arleigh
  7. "Suavecito"
    Ignacio Piñeiro (w&m)
  8. "Changüí Monte"
    Carlos Moré (music)
    Abelardo Barroso (words)
  9. "Los Tamalitos de Olga"
    José Antonio Fajardo (w&m)
  10. "Vacila con tú Trago"
    Music and words by:
    Rolando Valdés
    Tony Tejera
    Mario Clavell
  11. "Resabroso Cha-Cha-Chá"
    Gilberto Ruíz
  12. "Lo Que la Vida Enseña"
    José Ramón Sánchez (w&m)
  MLP 592
  Re-released as
  Aro 108
  OCLC 34651948, 316128715
278. Jam Session Goes Latino
  Featuring
  Al Grey & Isauro Hernández
  Recorded mid-1960s, Miami
  Wyatt Ruther (bass), Isauro Hernández (conga drums), Rufus Jones (drums), Noahwell M. Cruz (piano), Bobby Plater (sax & flute), Ricardo Reyes (vocals), Al Grey (trombone), Wallace Davenport (trumpet)
  (album playlist on YouTube)
  Side A:
  1. "Manteca"
  2. "What Kind Of Fool Am I?"
    Ricardo Reyes (vocalist)
  3. "Making Whoppee"
  4. "Miami Latin Beat"
    By Al Grey
  Side B:
  1. "The Girl From Ipanema"
  2. "What A Difference A Day Made"
    Ricardo Reyes (vocalist)
  3. "Lover Man"
  Puchito MLP 593 LP
  Antilla AP 593
279. Chappottín y sus Estrellas (1957)
  Miguelito Cuni (vocals)
  René Álvarez (vocals)
  Cheo Marquetti (vocals)
  Gino Martin (vocals)
  Side A:
  1. "Cienfuegos"
  2. "Asi No Quiero Ser Feliz"
  3. "Oriente"
  4. "Blanca Luna"
  5. "Eres Mi Tormento"
  6. "Cabio Sile Yeyeo"
  Side A:
  1. "No Vengas Por Mi"
  2. "Amor Verdadero"
  3. "La Protesta de Baraguá
  4. "No Puedes Dejarme"
  5. "Trasnochando"
  6. "Jóvenes del Muelle
  MLP 594 LP
  OCLC 48896589
280. Guaguancó Matancero
  Papín y Otros (1958)
  Guaguancó Vol. 2
  MLP 595 LP
  OCLC 53173418
281. Alex Ruano and Orchestra
  The Flamenco Sax
  MLP 596 LP
282. Jack Warren and his "Stereophonic Steel Band"
  Side A:
  1. "El Negrito del Batey"
    Héctor J. Díaz (arrangement)
    Medardo Guzmán (w&m)
  2. "Al di La"
  3. "Jamaica Farewell"
  4. "Mambo No. 5"
  5. "Joseph"
  6. "Warren's Special"
  Side B:
  1. "Merengue de la Empaliza"
  2. "Stardust"
  3. "Bésame Mucho"
  4. "Carnival in St. Thomas"
  5. "Green Eyes" ("Ojos Verdes")
  6. "El Manisero"
  7. "Ahora Seremos Felices"
  MLP 597 LP
  OCLC 181022747
283. Julio Rivero and His Combo
  Musical Gift
  MLP 598 LP
284. Abelardo Barroso
  Sensación Orquesta
  La Cumbancha
  MLP 599 LP
285. Alex Ruano With Paquito And His Rhythm
  Magic Sax
  MLP 600 LP
286. MLP 601 (same as J & G Recordings JG 19-69)
287. Orquesta Riverside
  Boleros y Boogaloo
  Side A:
  1. "Mira Que Bonita"
  2. "Consalacion Del Sur"
  3. "Tierra Querida"
  4. "Habla Con Tu Corazon
  5. "Que Tienes Titina"
  Side B:
  1. "Alma Con Alma"
  2. "El Villanazo"
  3. "Temor"
  4. "Para Que Fingir"
  5. "Luly"
  MLP 608 LP
288. Boogaloo con Los Tres Grandes
  1. Arsenio Rodríguez
  2. Orquesta Melodías del 40
  3. Chappottín
  MLP 609 LP
289. Pucho Fernández, Leopoldo Fernández
  Noche De Boda
  MLP 614 LP
290. Various (1957)
  Puchito Dance Sampler
  H8-OP-4700
  OCLC 190626637
291. Leopoldo Fernández & Filomeno (1956)
  MLP ??? LP

=== J & G Recordings ===
294. Tomás de San Julián
  Guantanamera — "La Noche De Mi Amor" y Otros Grandes Éxitos
  JG 19-67
295. José Miguel, Miguel Herrero, Carmelita Vazquez
  Flamenco
  JG 19-69
  Also released as
  Puchito MLP 601
296. Napoleón Dihmes
  Yo Soy ... Aquel
  JG 19-71
297. Rita Montaner
  Teatro Martí (Havana)
  JG 19-72
298. Rita Saenz
  La Sensacional
  JG 19-80
299. Mario Allison y Su Combo
  De Fiesta!
  JG 19-81
300. Coco Lagos y Sus Orates
  Descargas
  JG 19-82
301. Mario Allison y Su Combo
  Cumbayea
  JG 19-85
302. Mario Martínez
  El Nuevo Idolo De La Juventud
  Personnel includes:
  Alberto Guerra (guitar)
  JG 19-86
303. Paco Amayo y Su Combo
  Paco Amayo Canta
  JG 19-91

== LP imports ==
=== Talía Industria Manufacturera De Disco S.A. (manufactured in Peru) ===
304. Cosa Mas Grande Chico
  Tres Patines y El Señor Juez
  (Pototo y Filomeno)
  Side A:
  1. "Inscripción De Nacimiento"
    Leopoldo Fernández
  2. "El Hijo Del Penal"
    D.R. (Derechos Reservados)
  3. "Chino No Son Bobo"
    Chanito Isidrón
    (audio on YouTube)
  4. "Carta a Mamita"
    Leopoldo Fernández
  5. "Ese Número No Existe"
    Miguel Ojeda, Miguel Angel Pozo
  Side B:
  1. "En El Prescinto"
    D.R. (Derechos Reservados)
  2. "Yo Vendo Unos Ojos Negros"
    Tradicional
  3. "Mano A Mano"
    José Razzano (music)
    Carlos Gardel (music)
    Celedonio Flores (words)
  4. "Echame A Mi La Culpa"
    José Ángel Espinoza
    Leopoldo Fernández
  5. "Enciéndeme la Vela"
    José Ángel Espinoza
    Leopoldo Fernández
  TT-783
  Transcripción Puchito
  (Radio transcription)

== See also ==
- Puchito Records
