= Manolo Álvarez Mera =

Cuban tenor and bel canto singer (1923–1986)

Manolo Álvarez Mera (né Manuel Ernesto Álvarez-Mera November 7, 1923 – October 16, 1986) was a Cuban-born tenor who flourished as a bel canto during the late 1940s and 1950s. Despite having an operatic caliber voice, he gained popularity singing in operettas, musical reviews, radio, television, vaudeville, and major night clubs in Cuba, New York, and Latin America. He became a Cuban exile in 1960 after the Cuban Revolution.

== Career ==
=== Cuba ===
Álvarez was born November 7, 1923, to Beniana (née Mera) and Manuel Alvarez in the Luyanó neighborhood of Diez de Octubre, Havana, Cuba. After formally studying voice in Havana, Álvarez performed for the first time in public at the Teatro Principal de la Comedia (Main Theater of Comedy) in Havana in 1943, singing the role of Niño Fernando in María la O, a one act zarzuela, a characteristically Spanish genre of lyric and dramatic theatre. The lyrics were by Gustavo Sánchez Galarraga (1893–1934) and the music by Ernesto Lecuona. Maruja González (1904–1999) sang the soprano role of Mary la O. He went on in 1944 to perform at the Teatro Lírico Cubano (Lyric Theater of Cuba), singing in La Plaza de la Catedral (The Cathedral Square), a zarzuela by Lecuona. He sang the same work for radio stations RHC-Cadena Azul and CMQ.

He then performed in several zarzuelas, including Luisa Fernanda, Los gavilanes, La leyenda del beso, La dolorosa, and Cecilia Valdés, which also included singers Maruja Montes (1930–1993), Rosita Fornés (born 1943), Zoraida Marrero (1911–2004), Esther Borja (1913–2013), Sarita Escarpentier (born 1925), Dorini de Diso (1901–1948), Miguel de Grandy, Antonio Palacios, Jesús Freyre, and Gregorio Barrios (1911–1978).

=== New York ===
On September 16, 1947, he appeared as a soloist in the musical revue Violins Over Broadway at the Diamond Horseshoes Night Club in New York, produced by impresario Billy Rose. The show ran for two years.

=== Brazil ===
In 1950, Álvarez moved to Rio de Janeiro and performed in São Paulo and on several Brazilian radio stations.

=== Argentina, Chile, and Uruguay ===
In 1952, Álvarez toured Chile including visits to Buenos Aires and Montevideo. His performances were acclaimed by the Cuban magazine, Carteles.

In his Uruguay radio concerts, Álvarez was hailed "Sir Hyperbole!" Many of his interpretations, including María la O; Granada by Agustín Lara; and Ay-Ay-Ay by Osmán Pérez Freire, were interrupted with applause, and he was forced to repeat them three or four times. The night of the farewell, as he went on stage, the audience — more than two thousand excited people — threw a rain of carnations and roses, forming a cloak over him. The program was interrupted for a long time by this emotional tribute.

Álvarez continued his tour to Brazil and also returned to Buenos Aires. He had an exclusive recording contract with Victor and recorded Granada by Agustín Lara and Despedida by María Grever with the RCA Orchestra under the direction of conductor Vieri Fidanzini.

=== United States ===
Álvarez returned to the United States in 1951. Accompanied by the Carlos Molina Orchestra (1899–1982), Álvarez sang Granada in a short 1953 film Carnival in April released in 3D by Universal. The film also featured Toni Arden, Josephine Premice, and Fernando Rodriguez. On April 4, 1954, he appeared on the television show, The Colgate Comedy Hour, with Eddie Cantor. He also appeared at the Flamingo Las Vegas with Freddie Martin.

=== Hollywood ===
By mid-March 1953, Álvarez had been studying for six months with Arthur Rosenberg. On April 18, 1954 — Easter Sunday — Álvarez sang The Lord's Prayer in a sunrise national broadcast produced by David Rose at the Hollywood Bowl with conductor Miklós Rózsa.

In 1954, he appeared as a featured singer in New York at the Waldorf Astoria with Freddie Martin and His Orchestra. He also appeared at the Edgewater Beach in Chicago, and the Skyroom at the Mapes Hotel in Reno. He held a principal role in the production Spanish Fantasy, a show that toured America, performing at venues that included the Terrace Room at the Statler Hotel in Los Angeles. and the Empire Room at the Statler Hilton in Dallas. He also sang on the NBC television program Saturday Night Review, Coast to Coast.

=== Antioquia and Cuba ===
In August 1955, Álvarez was featured in a Tropicana production of Evocación (Evocation) and Seis Lindas Cubanas (Six Pretty Cubans) the latter referencing the six provinces of Cuba (before the Revolution). The production was staged by Rodrigo Neira, who was known as "Rodney". (Note: Rodney (né José Roderico Neyra, also spelled Neira; born 11 February 1912 Oriente Province, Cuba) (photo) was a dancer-turned-choreographer who created and choreographed for the Tropicana six to eight back-to-back shows a season from 1952 to 1959. (Havana Before Castro: When Cuba Was a Tropical Playground, by Peter Charles Moruzzi (born 1961), Gibbs Smith, 2008, pg. 111; OCLC 212020815)) The show was presented in a telecast from Medellín, Antioquia, and was a review of nineteenth century Cuban dance and music. Other performers included Xiomara Alfaro, Cuarteto Faxas, (Note: Carlos Faxas (1921–2014), pianist and arranger) Estelita Santaló, (Note: Estelita Santaló (1931–2015) was a Cuban soprano) Cuarteto d'Aida, Leonela González, (Note: Leonela González (born 1930) was an actress who had a role in the 1950 Cuban film Siete muertes a plazo fijo; she had been Tropicana's top dancer for seven years; she left Cuba June 1959) the dancers Ana Gloria and Rolando, (Note: Ana Gloria and Rolando (Ana Gloria Varona and Rolando García); Ana Gloria Varona was married to Luisito del Pozo, son of Justo Luis del Pozo, major of Havana from 1954 to 1958, and the last mayor before overthrow; she was also a goddaughter of Miguel Matamoros (1894–1971); Rolando immigrated to Miami and retired from dancing.) and the Lago Sisters Trio. (Note: Trío Hermanas Lago was a vocal trio of three sisters from Cuba widely credited as the first female trio to excel during the golden age of trios and boleros in the 1940s and 1950s throughout Latin-America, and particularly in Cuba and Mexico; the founding sisters in 1932 were (a) Graciela Lago Muela (1918–1996), (b) Cristina Lago Muela (1919–1974), and (c) Esperanza Lago Muela (1921–1954); Esperanza married and left the group in 1947, and was replaced by Lucía Lago Muela (born 1925), another sister; Esperanza returned in 1950, making it a quartet; but Esperanza died in 1954, making it a trio again)

The same production, with mostly the same artists, including Álvarez, was presented in a telecast April 21, 1956.

=== Hollywood ===
He sang to replace the voice of Mario Lanza in the 1958 film, Seven Hills of Rome. (Note: An alternate version of the claim was that Mario Lanza was scheduled to appear on the Ed Sullivan Show while he was shooting the film, Seven Hills of Rome. MGM, to protect their investment in Lanza, retained Álvarez as a reserve, and, according to lore, used him as a threat to strengthen Lanza's devotion to the film.: Lanza on the Ed Sullivan Show (1958); Lanza and Álvarez both had studied with Alejandro Granda (1898–1962) at an academy he had set up in Hollywood in 1947 — Biography: "Alejandro Granda," Radio Filarmonía 102.7 FM (website) (retrieved December 17, 2015))

=== Final performances in Cuba ===
In February 1958, Álvarez headlined in the Copa Room at the Hotel Habana Riviera with Cuarteto d'Aida. Among his last stage performances in Cuba, he was acclaimed for his appearances in the theater as Ivan Marti in La leyenda del beso (1959) and Rosillon in The Merry Widow (1960). In Cuba, he performed on television, in theaters, on several recordings, and in casinos, which included the Tropicana and Hotel Capri.

In 1959, Álvarez sang on TV Adiós, Granada in Emigrantes, a zarzuela composed by Tomás Barrera Saavedra (1870–1938) and Rafael Calleja Gómez (1870–1938). Other performers in that production included Alfredo Kraus, Miguel Fleta, Victoria de los Ángeles, Tito Schipa, Giuseppe Di Stefano, Hipólito Lázaro, Pepe Romeu, Juan García, Luis Mariano and Misha Alexandrovich. (On Archive.org)

On February 2, 1960, he was acclaimed by the Diario de la Marina as "the First Tenor of Cuba and one of the best in the world," for his headline performance in Noche Cubana, a live evening national telecast by CMBF-TV. Other singers included Barbarito Diez, María Teresa Vera, Lorenzo Hierrezuelo, and the group Cuarteto d'Aida.

=== United States ===
On August 21, 1960, Álvarez was a guest on the Ed Sullivan Show, singing Mattinatta.

== Personal life ==
Álvarez married Delfina Cougil Fernandez (born 13 March 1925). They had two children, Teresita (Terry) (born 1959) and Manuel (born 1961). In 1963, he settled in New York, where he died on October 14, 1986. He had lived at 216 West 102nd Street in Manhattan.

== Selected discography ==
- Manolo Álvarez-Mera, Puchitio MLP-505 (LP) (196?)

Manolo Álvarez-Mera, tenor vocal; Orquesta Bajo, Roberto Valdés Arnau, director
OCLC 913818568
Side A

1. "Júrame" ("Swear"), by María Grever (on YouTube)
2. "Marta," by Moisés Simons (On YouTube)
3. "No Niegues que me quisistes" ("Do Not Deny That You Wanted Me"), by Jorge del Moral (On YouTube)
4. "Siempre en Mi Corazón" ("Always In My Heart"), by Ernesto Lecuona † (1st on YouTube, 2nd, 3rd)
5. "No Puedo ser feliz" ("I Can Not Be Happy"), by Adolfo Guzman (On YouTube)

Side B

1. "Torna a Sorriento" ("Come Back to Sorrento") by Ernesto De Curtis
2. "Mattinatta" ("Morning"), by Ruggero Leoncavallo (On YouTube) ‡
3. "Core 'ngrato" ("Ingrate Heart"), by Salvatore Cardillo, Riccardo Cordiferro
4. "La donna è mobile" ("Women Are Flighty"), by Verdi
5. "Estrellita" ("Little Star"), by Manuel Ponce
- Canciones Cubanas (Cuban Songs), Vol. II, Puchitio MLP-553 & Antilla MLP-553 (LP) (196?)

Manolo Álvarez-Mera; Gran Orquesta, Roberto Valdés Arnau, director
OCLC 53980565, 443637670
Side A

1. "María Belén Chacón" ("Romance of María Belén"), words adopted by José Sánchez Arcilla, music by Rodrigo Prats
2. "Si llego a besarte" ("If I Kiss You"), by Luis Casas Romero (1882–1950) (On YouTube)
3. "Quiéreme Mucho" ("Yours"), lyrics by Agustin Rodriguez, music by Gonzalo Roig (On YouTube)
4. "Mirame así" ("Look At Me, Well"), by Eduardo Sánchez de Fuentes (On YouTube)
5. "Soledad" ("Loneliness"), by Rodrigo Prats

Side B

1. "Esclavo libre" ("Free Slave"), by Ernesto Lecuona
2. "La Bayamesa" ("Women of Bayamo, Cuba"), by Sindo Garay On YouTube
3. "Corazon" ("Heart"), by Eduardo Sánchez de Fuentes
4. "Habanera Tú" ("You Dance" the Habanera), by Eduardo Sánchez de Fuentes (1st on YouTube, 2nd)
5. "María la O", lyrics by Gustavo Sánchez Galarraga (1893–1934), music by Ernesto Lecuona
- Por Los Campos De Cuba (Through the Fields of Cuba) AF Records (LP) (1996)
11. "La Bayamesa" ("Women of Bayamo, Cuba"), by Sindo Garay (of 15 tracks)
- America Inmortal, Reyes (LP) (1996)
10. "La Bayamesa" ("Women of Bayamo, Cuba"), by Sindo Garay (of 15 tracks)
- Funcion de Gala (Gala), J. & G. Recordings (196?)

Live, Teatro Marti, Havana
OCLC 469772714

5. "Elena," by Roberto García Masvidal (of 12 tracks)
9. "Yo Soy Tú Fracaso" ("I'm Your Failure"), by Roberto García Masvidal (of 12 tracks)
- Manolo Alvarez-Mera, RCA Victor 82-5470 (78 rpm)

82-5450-A: "Granada," by Agustín Lara
82-5450-B: "Despedida," by María Grever

- SMC Records (78 rpm)

Manolo Alvarez-Mera; Orchestra directed by Roberto Valdés Arnau

2521-B "Romance Gitano," by Carlos Granados

OCLC 79110973

† The song "Always in My Heart" received an Oscar nomination for "Best Original Song," in the 1942 film, Always in My Heart, losing to "White Christmas" from the film White Christmas. Nonetheless, some critics regard Álvarez's recording of "Siempre en mi corazon" as the best performance of the song.

‡ "Mattinata" ("Morning"), written in 1904, was the first song ever written expressly for the Gramophone Company.
