= Manuel Quiroga =

Manuel Quiroga may refer to:

- Manuel Quiroga (composer)
- Manuel Quiroga (violinist)
