= Pilón =

Cuban music genre

Pilón is a Cuban musical form and a popular dance created in the 1950s. named for the town of Pilón, on the southern coast of Cuba. The rhythms of Pilón are based on the motions of pounding sugarcane. One unique aspect of the pilón is the use of simultaneous piano and electric guitar guajeos. Rhythmically, the guitar plays a much simpler form of the piano part. The following example is written in 4/4 rather than cut-time.

The creation of Pilón is often attributed to bandleader and singer Pacho Alonso in collaboration with percussionist/composer Enrique Bonne.

== Enrique Bonne ==
Enrique Bonne [was] a timbalero, prolific songwriter and creator of various rhythms such as pilón, simalé and upa upa. As the leader of Enrique Bonne y sus Tambores, he was also a pioneer in bringing Afro‐Cuban folkloric influences into popular music. Of the many rhythms that Bonne created or popularized for Pacho's band, the most important was pilón. It started as a dance craze, with the dancers mimicking the movement of stirring a vat of roasting coffee beans, but long after the dance had been relegated to the history of pop culture, the rhythm itself continued to influence the likes of José Luis "Changuito" Quintana of Los Van Van, Orlando Mengual of Charanga Habanera, Denis "Papacho" Savón of Issac Delgado, Tomás "El Panga" Ramos of Paulito FG and Cubanismo, and many Latin Jazz musicians—Moore.

Enrique's son Angel Bonne continued the musical tradition.

== See also ==
Puchito Records discography:# René del Mar and His Cunjunto
"Como Te Gusta A Ti"
Enrique Bonne
209
(45 rpm) F8-OW-6793
