= Cheo Marquetti =

Cuban vocalist and songwriter (1909–1967)

José Marcelino Marquetti Díaz (April 26, 1909 – March 29, 1967), better known as Cheo Marquetti, was a renowned Cuban son vocalist and songwriter.

== Life and career ==
Marquetti was born at 277 Velarde Street, El Cerro, Havana, Cuba. He was the son of Mercedes Díaz Campos and David "El Lucumí" Marquetti Suárez, an Abakuá member of Los Chinos Buenos, a mixed band whose members dressed as Chinese. He grew up in the Havana neighborhoods of San Juan de Dios and Cayo Hueso. He started his career in 1926 with the sexteto Minerva. He joined the Belén Puig Orchestra and the Ernesto Muñoz Conjuncto in 1930 as singer of danzón music. He then joined a number of septetos, among them Septeto Cauto, led by Manuel 'Mozo' Borgella with whom he recorded in 1940 (including the song Efi Embemoro - the first Afro-Ñáñigo song to be recorded; Cheo Marquetti previously had recorded this tune in a duet setting with Bienvenido Granda in 1936, accompanied by Septeto Nacional de Ignacio Piñeiro). This was followed by stints with Septeto Hatuey, Septeto Facenda and the famous Septeto Habanero. He is also said to have been a member of Septeto Cuba, Alabama de Abelardo Barroso, Jóvenes del Cayo, Dandy del 40, La Sonora Piñón and Septeto Mora.

In an effort to achieve wider recognition he left Cuba for Mexico in the mid forties. Only mildly successful, he returned in 1953. Back in Havana he joined Orquesta Sensación, led by Rolando Valdés (to briefly replace the much more famous sonero Abelardo Barroso). This engagement was followed by temporary stints at a group whose fame survives today, Chappottín y sus Estrellas, whose members at the peak of their success and fame were Félix Chappottín, Miguelito Cuní, René Álvarez, Lilí Martínez and Gina Martín, as well as Marquetti. Between 1955 and 1957 he had his own conjunto, Los Salseros, with whom he recorded a couple of albums for Panart (reissued by EGREM).

He also made appearances in a number of Mexican movies, including Cuñado los hijos se van (1941), Chucho el remendado (1951) and Mujeres del teatro (1951).

In 1957, he traveled to Venezuela and on his return rejoined Orquesta Sensación. In 1958, he left the group and formed another conjunto for more recordings. In 1961, he dissolved his group to move to Panama. He returned to Havana in 1963. After his return he was an occasional contributor to Grupo Tutankamen. He died in relative obscurity in El Cerro, Havana, Cuba, at the relatively young age of 57.

== Style and legacy ==
Cheo Marquetti is a real "singer's singer" with a beautifully lyrical and expressive voice. Contemporary vocalists and musicians such as Henry Fiol count him as a major influence. A few compilations of Cheo Marquetti's solo recordings have recently been reissued.

== Family ==
His cousin, Luis Marquetti, was a famous composer, responsible for, among others, the classic song Deuda.

== Trivia ==
José "Cheo" Marquetti had a diverse ancestry. His father, David Marquetti Suárez, was known by the nickname "El Lucumí" and was an Abakuá member, suggesting a strong heritage of West African (Yoruba) descent. Conversely, the family surname Marquetti is etymologically linked to the common Italian surname Marchetti (a plural diminutive of Marco). The shift from Marchetti to Marquetti is consistent with the process of hispanization that often occurred when Italian immigrants settled in Cuba and other Spanish-speaking territories, suggesting the name traces its roots to Italy.
