= Tito Gómez (Cuban singer) =

Cuban singer

Tito Gómez (born José Antonio Tenreiro Gómez; January 30, 1920 in Havana, Cuba – 16 October 2000) was a Cuban singer.

In 1938, he won a music contest in his native Cuba, called La Corte Suprema del Arte (The Supreme Court of Art). Shortly afterwards, he joined the Sevilla Biltmore Orquestra and in 1939, he began singing for Orquesta Riverside. His breakthrough came with the hit "Vereda Tropical".

In the 1970s, he was part of a group called Orquesta Jorrín, led by Enrique Jorrín, inventor of the cha-cha-chá.
