= RHC-Cadena Azul =

Radio Habana Cuba-Cadena Azul (lit. "Radio Havana Cuba-Blue Network") was a Cuban radio network operating in various forms from 1939 until 1954. It was a heated rival of radio network CMQ.

== History ==
=== Origins ===
RHC was created in 1939 by Felix O'Shea, founder of Havana's CMK radio station, with stations in Jovellanos, Matanzas and Victoria de Las Tunas; the network was then sold to Cristóbal Díaz González. Cadena Azul began in 1939. In 1940, Amado Trinidad Velazco became the owner and various Cuban stations merged with CMHI, among which were CMCF and CMKO thus forming Radio Habana Cuba, with its offices at Prado #54, corner of Capdevila Street. Díaz González was a partner with the Cuban telephone company, and with his connections the network had access to a telephone line repeater that could pass on the signals across the island.

=== Characteristics ===
The goals of RHC Cadena Azul were to:

- Promote Cuban-ness
- Protect domestic artists
- Position Cuban music in its "rightful" place as they saw it
- Provide the listener with the best quality music
- Raise the standards of music broadcasting by radio

To achieve this Trinidad raised the artists' and technicians' salaries. RHC Cadena Azul employed 40 singers, 34 actors, 18 announcers, 20 writers, 10 composers and 10 bands.

Some famous musicians of RHC Cadena Azul were Iris Burguet, Manolo Álvarez Mera, René Cabell, Vicentico Valdés, Miguelito Valdés, Joseíto Fernández and Barbarito Diez; actors like Rita Montaner, Jesús Alvariño, Rolando Ochoa, Leopoldo Fernández Salgado, Aníbal de Mar, Otto Sirgo and Rosendo Rosell.

Singer and composer Sindo Garay, was one of the network's most popular artists, with 116 songs. Mexican artists who worked at the studios between 1942 and 1946 included Jorge Negrete, Tito Guizar and Pedro Vargas, and Argentine entertainer Libertad Lamarque.

=== End of the Trinidad era ===
In 1952, Trinidad sold the network to Bed Marving of the U.S., who changed its name to Cadena Azul de Cuba.

On March 1, 1954, Cadena Azul de Cuba was closed replaced by the Circuito Nacional Cubano.
