= Juan Mendoza =

Mexican singer

Juan Mendoza (1917–1978), also known by his stage name El Tariácuri, was a Mexican singer of the Mariachi genre, a folkloric-regional music of Mexico. He also participated in films in the 60s. Mendoza was part of the "Trio Tariácuri", and his sister was also singer-actress Amalia Mendoza.

== Filmography ==
Year	Title	Role	Notes
1964	Vuelve el Norteño	Juan	
1964	El revólver sangriento	Vicente	
1965	Aquella Rosita Alvírez		
1966	El jinete justiciero en retando a la muerte		

== Discography ==
=== Album ===
Year	Title	Notes
1966	El Tariácuri	
1969	Así canta	
1974	Juan Mendoza	
—	Creí	With Mariachi Jalisco de Pepe Villa
—	Mis canciones favoritas	
—	Pa' todo el año	

=== Single ===
Year	Title	Other Artist
1956	A rienda suelta / Siempre hace frío	Mariachi México de Pepe Villa
1957	El huitlacoche / El parrandero	Mariachi Guadalajara de Silvestre Vargas
1957	Sufriendo a solas / No soy monedita de oro	Mariachi Jalisco de Pepe Villa
1958	Las leyes del mundo / Dos monedas	Mariachi Guadalajara de Silvestre Vargas
1959	Cuando ya no me quieras / Volver a ti	Mariachi Jalisco de Pepe Villa
1959	De cigarro en cigarro / Te pertenezco	Mariachi Zapopan de Miguel Martínez
1962	Detente / Penitencia	Juan Mendoza con el Mariachi México de Pepe Villa
