= Abelardo Barroso =

Cuban bandleader and singer (1905–1972)

Abelardo Barroso Dargeles (21 September 1905 – 27 September 1972) was a Cuban bandleader and singer, the first sonero mayor (lead singer of the son) to be recognized as such by the Cuban public.

== Biography ==
Born in Havana, Cuba, he was the lead singer of the Sexteto Habanero from 1925, recorded with the Sexteto Boloña in 1926, and joined the Septeto Nacional de Ignacio Piñeiro in 1927. With each of these top bands he made a string of recordings in New York City, and for the rest of his life his voice was in demand.

In 1929–1930 he joined the stage variety group Salmerón, with whom he toured Spain. Returning to Cuba in 1931, he joined the Orquesta Ernesto Muñoz. In 1933 he founded the charanga López–Barroso with Orestes López. He appeared alternately with this band and with the Sexteto Universo, and in 1935 founded the Sexteto Pinin. There followed spells with the bands of Andrés Laferté and Everado Ordaz before, in 1939, he joined the important charanga Maravillas del Siglo and performed on Radio COCO. During the 1940s he worked at the cabaret Sans-Souci until 1948, when he directed and sang for the National Police Band. After a short hiatus, he joined Rolando Valdés' Orquesta Sensación, which would spearhead the second great charanga movement (the first wave included Antonio Arcaño y sus Maravillas and Melodías del 40). They won the Disco de Oro for a recording of "En Guantánamo" and "Arráncame la vida". With La Sensación he appeared in Miami in 1957 and in New York in 1959 and 1960. He retired in 1969.

== Discography ==
- Cha Cha Chá, album, World Circuit (2014)

== See also ==
- Puchito Records
- Puchito Records discography
