= Adolfo Guzmán =

Cuban pianist (1920–1976)

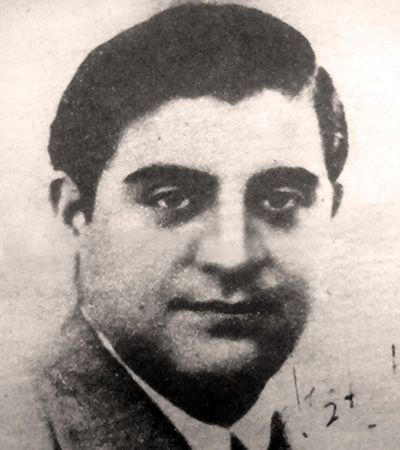

Background information
- Born: Adolfo José Guzmán González; May 13, 1920; La Habana, Cuba
- Died: July 30, 1976 (aged 56) La Habana, Cuba
- Genres: Canción, filin, big band, jazz, tango, waltz, marches
- Occupations: Musician, conductor, arranger, composer
- Instrument: Piano
- Years active: 1937–1976
- Labels: Panart, EGREM
- Formerly of: Orquesta Riverside, Los Modernistas

Adolfo Guzmán (May 13, 1920 – July 30, 1976) was a Cuban pianist, music director, arranger and composer. During his 40-year-long career he directed several important Cuban ensembles, including Orquesta Riverside and Los Modernistas, as well as prominent radio and cabaret orchestras.

== Career ==
=== Early life and career ===
Born in Santos Suárez, Havana on May 13, 1920, to María González and Eladio Guzmán (their eighth child), Adolfo José Guzmán González learned piano at a young age; he made his first composition, "Marina", a waltz, at age 14. He was 18 when he wrote his first notable composition, "Recuerdos del ayer", also a waltz. He studied piano with Alberto Falcón, and harmony, instrumentation and composition with Bernardo Moncada. After finishing his studies in January 1936, he joined singer Floro Acosta forming the Dúo Ideal; they played together for a few months until Acosta moved to Venezuela He also played with the Hermanos Justiniani. His early career was linked to tango, a genre which he would cultivate for a few years. In 1938, he became the pianist for Los románticos gauchos, which featured Peruvian-born singer Ricardo Dantés, who Guzmán accompanied at the CMW Cadena Roja radio station. Around this time he started writing many of his most famous compositions such as "Recuerdos del ayer", "Melancolía" and "Luna del Congo". He devoted much of his time to the musicalization of poems.

=== Radio and theatre career ===
After touring Cuba in 1939, Guzmán joined RHC-Cadena Azul in 1941 as the pianist for Argentine tango singer Alberto Gómez. In 1943 he became the musical director for Radio Mil Diez, where he met important music directors such as Antonio Arcaño and Enrique González Mántici, who were notable influences. He conducted a tango orchestra with which he toured extensively, and in 1944 he accompanied Gómez on a tour around the Dominican Republic (he would tour the country again in 1948). That year he also toured with Libertad Lamarque. Between 1943 and 1946 he directed orchestras at the Zombie Club, Cabaret Montmatre, Habana Casino, Teatro América, Teatro Fausto, Teatro Nacional and Teatro Campoamor. He was the first music director of the Teatro Warner Radiocentro, founded on December 23, 1947.

=== Television career ===
In 1950 he made his debut as music director, pianist and arranger on Canal 6 (CMQ TV) shortly after the establishment of TV in Cuba. He worked in the TV Show "Álbum Musical Phillips" alongside Rafael Somavilla. In October 1952 he started giving music lessons in "Fin de Siglo y Ud.", accompanying singer Salvador Levy on piano. He later directed Orquesta CMBF Televisión (Canal 7) and became one of the first jingle composers in Cuba (together with Eduardo Saborit). Remaining in Cuba after the Revolution, in 1959 he founded the Coro Gigante de la CTC Nacional together with Isolina Carrillo, and on August 4, 1960, he became the president of the Instituto Cubano de Derechos Musicales ("Cuban Institute of Musical Rights"), a position he would hold until his death. Starting in 1961 and during the following 25 years, he appeared in "Álbum de Cuba" as music director alongside Esther Borja. He became heavily involved with the ICRT (Instituto Cubano de Radio y Televisión).

=== Late music career ===
After directing Orquesta Riverside between 1957 and 1962, Adolfo Guzmán recorded several sessions for EGREM (Pianoforte, split with Frank Emilio Flynn and Peruchín). Between 1966 and 1967 he directed the quartet Los Modernistas, replacing Fernando Mulens. Around this time he also became the music director of the Teatro Musical. He conducted the ICRT orchestra in 1970, and he took part in the Festival Internacional de la Canción de Varadero in 1970 and Festival de Música Cubana in 1975, both held in Varadero, as jury member and music director. In 1975, he wrote the music for several TV shows: Ulises, Los Tres Mosqueteros and Los Insurgentes.

=== Death and legacy ===
Adolfo Guzmán died on July 30, 1976, in Havana. In the summer of 1978, the ICRT organized the first Concurso de Música Cubana Adolfo Guzmán ("Adolfo Guzmán Cuban Music Contest") in his honor.

== Style and influence ==
Guzmán is considered one of the main instrumental filin composers alongside Frank Emilio Flynn and Luis Yáñez. According to musicologist and producer María Teresa Linares, he was one of the key innovators of the canción, a genre he cultivated between 1938 ("Sin saber por qué") and 1971 ("He perdido la fe"). He was called a "fabulous arranger" by singer Esther Borja. A clear jazz influence is present in his compositions and arrangements. He also cultivated classical music, as exemplified by his Concerto for piano and orchestra. As a music director, he was strict and well-respected.

== Personal life ==
Adolfo Guzmán had five children: Ligia, Gilda, Grisel, Arianne and Adolfo Fidel. Ligia became a musicologist and Adolfo Fidel became a pianist. Guzmán was a firm supporter of communism and a member of the Popular Socialist Party since the 1940s, and later the Communist Party of Cuba. As a result, he was denied entry into the US when Orquesta Riverside gave a concert in Miami. He also adopted his nephew Julio Antonio Guzmán from his wife side when his young son passed away tragically. Julio Antonio Guzmán left Cuba and also became a musician, directing his own orchestra called Conjunto Constelación.

== Awards and honors ==
- Composer of the Year (1952) for "No puedo ser feliz"
- Orden Raúl Gómez García (1968)
- Orden XX Aniversario del Desembarco del Granma (1976)
- Orden XV Aniversario del Consejo Nacional de Cultura (1976)
- Héroe Nacional del Trabajo (1976) ("Labor Hero of the Republic of Cuba")

== Bibliography ==
- Depestre Catony, Leonardo (1988). Adolfo Guzmán: apuntes y testimonios (in Spanish). Santiago de Cuba: Oriente.
