= Orquesta Riverside =

Cuban band

- Also known as: Orquesta Havana Riverside
- Origin: Havana, Cuba
- Genres: Big band, bolero, cha-cha-cha
- Years active: 1938–1993
- Labels: Victor, Ideal, Panart, Puchito, EGREM
- Past members: José Curbelo, Tito Gómez, Peruchín, Adolfo Guzmán, Rubén González

Orquesta Riverside (known as Orquesta Havana Riverside between 1938 and 1941) was a highly successful Cuban big band that was amongst the most popular ensembles of the 1940s and 1950s. Founded in 1938, it was originally directed by local musician Enrique González Mantici until 1945. Other directors were Antonio Sosa (1945–47), Pedro Vila (1947–57), Adolfo Guzmán (1957–62), Argelio González and Nelson Arocha.

In 1993, the ensemble disbanded after a long period lacking success. Years later, Raúl Nacianceno Miyares, a former saxophonist in the band, revived the name of the band with young music graduates, playing the same arrangements as 50 years ago.

== Members ==
- Enrique González Mantici: director (1938–1942)
- José Curbelo: piano (1938–1940)
- Platanito: trumpet
- Antonio Temprano: trumpet
- Emilio Temprano: trombone
- "Periquito" Temprano: clarinet, alto saxophone
- José Nacianceno: clarinet, alto saxophone
- Asdrúbal Pardo: tenor saxophone
- Pedro Pardo: tenor saxophone
- Antonio Sosa: guitar, tumbadora, director (1938–1947)
- Julio Belzaqui: double bass
- Manolo Castro: vocals (1938)
- Pedro Vargas: vocals (1939)
- Mario Suárez: vocals (1939)
- Guillermo Portabales: vocals (1939)
- René Cabel: vocals (1939–40)
- Chucho Martínez Gil: vocals (1939)
- Miguelito Valdés: vocals (1940)
- Anselmo Sacasas: piano (1940)
- Juan Arvizu: vocals (1940)
- Lupita Palomera: vocals (1940)
- Juan Bruno Tarraza: piano
- Tito Álvarez: vocals
- Alberto Ruiz: vocals (until 1942)
- Tito Gómez: lead vocals (1942–1975)
- Orlando Vallejo: vocals
- Onelio Pérez: vocals
- René Ravelo: saxophone
- Gregorio Brenes: saxophone
- José Simpson: saxophone
- Raúl Nacianceno Mijares: saxophone
- Miguel Antuña Benítez: saxophone
- Roberto Arocha Morales: saxophone
- Marcos Urbay: trumpet
- Enrique Osorio: trumpet
- José A. Martínez Daussac: trumpet
- Mario del Monte Cossío: trumpet
- Armando Galán Alfonso: trumpet
- Roberto Morell del Campo: trombone
- Edgar Díaz: drums
- Sergio L. Núñez Molina: drums
- Rolando Piloto Álvarez: drums
- Orlando "Cachaíto" López: double bass
- Roberto Martínez Capote: double bass
- Baudilio Carbonell: bongo
- Peruchín: piano, arranger (1946–1959)
- Ángel Fernández de la Osa: congas
- Carlos Montero Bello: guitar
- Pedro Vila: saxophone, director (1947–1957)
- Leonardo Timor: trumpet (since 1956)
- Generoso Jiménez: trombone
- Adolfo Guzmán: piano, director (1957–1962)
- Paquito Hechavarría: piano
- Rubén González: piano
- Argelio González: director
- Nelson Arocha Enseñat: piano, director, arranger
- Orlando Montero Maldonado:vocals
- Manuel "Guajiro" Mirabal: trumpet (1960s)
- Joseíto González: piano (1980s)
- Raúl Nacianceno: saxophone, director
