= Tito Gómez (Puerto Rican singer) =

Puerto Rican musician

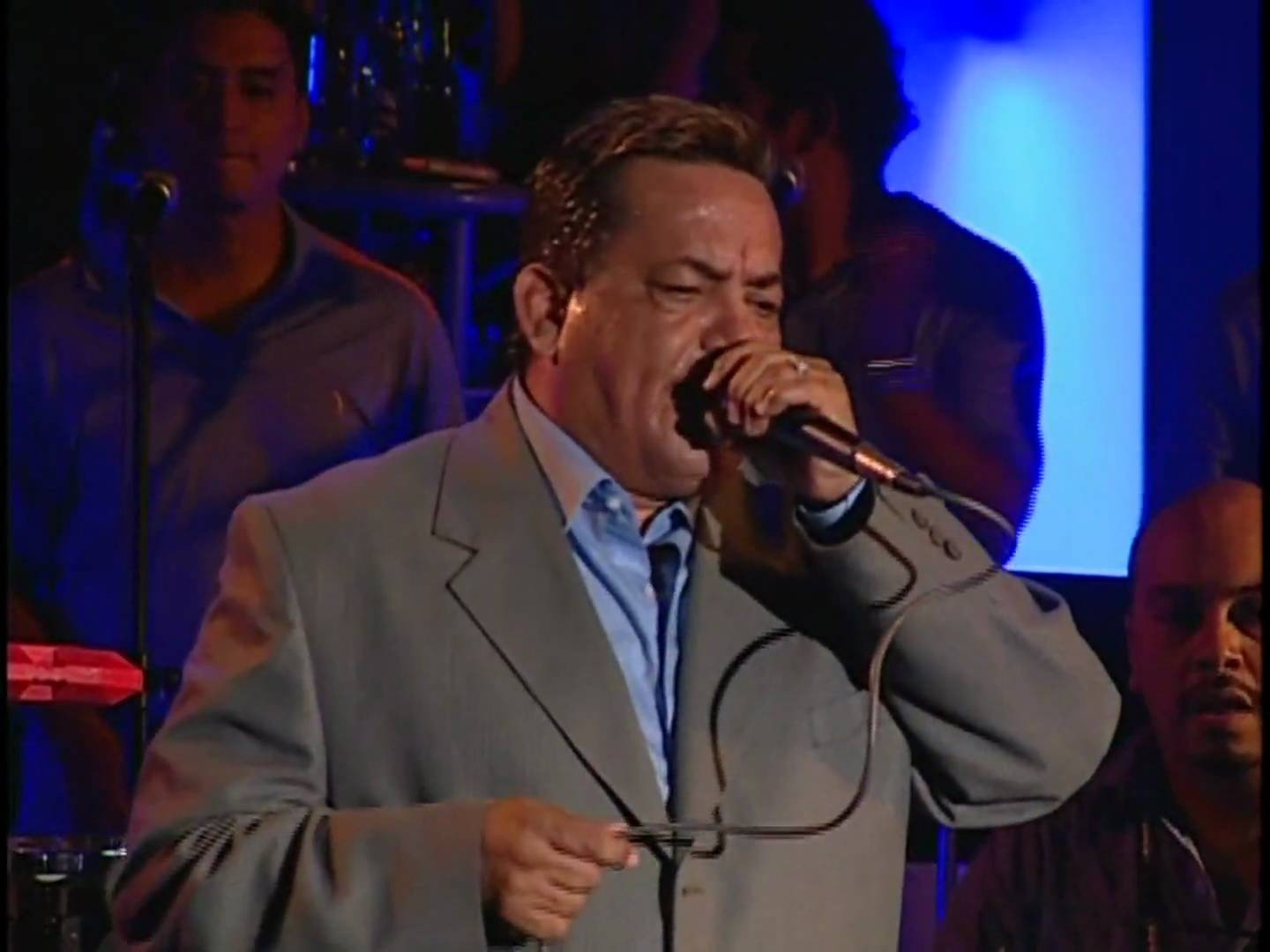
- Gomez performing live in Colombia on April, 19th, 2007, less than 2 months before his death.

Background information
- Birth name: Humberto Luis Gómez Rivera
- Born: April 9, 1948
- Origin: Juana Díaz, Puerto Rico
- Died: June 11, 2007 (aged 59); Cali, Colombia
- Genres: Salsa
- Years active: 1984–2007

Tito Gómez (born Humberto Luis Gómez Rivera, April 9, 1948, in Juana Díaz, Puerto Rico – June 11, 2007, in Cali, Colombia) was a Puerto Rican salsa singer.

== Group career ==
His musical career started at the age of 15 singing with the Conjunto Antoanetti before joining the Sonora Ponceña as co-lead vocalist in 1967. In 1973 Ponceña trumpeter Joe Rodriguez, percussionist Mikey Ortiz and Gómez broke away and formed La Terrifica. Later, Gómez joined Ray Barretto's band sharing vocal duties with Ruben Blades, most notably on the 1975 Barretto album.

The following year he returned to La Sonora Ponceña where he remained for two years. In 1979 he moved to Venezuela to join La Amistad, a short-lived project with former members of La Dimension Latina. In 1982 he went solo once again and returned to Puerto Rico.

In 1985, he joined Colombian band Grupo Niche, relocated to Colombia, and sang lead vocals with them for eight years.

== Solo career and death ==
He went solo in the early 1990s making seven albums in nine years for Miami-based Musical Productions. His debut Un Nuevo Horizonte included a hit single "Dejala" featuring Tito Rojas.

Gómez's musical career came to a temporary end when he was convicted for transporting counterfeit money in the United States in 2000, serving time in a federal prison. Upon release in 2004 went back to Puerto Rico to his hometown Juana Diaz and relaunched his solo career. He was in the middle of a reunion tour of Colombia with Grupo Niche when he died of a heart attack on June 11, 2007, in Cali, Colombia. He was buried in his hometown of Juana Diaz, Puerto Rico at the Juana Diaz Municipal Cemetery.
