= Celina González =

Cuban singer

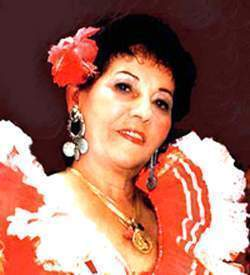

Background information
- Born: March 16, 1929
- Origin: Cuba
- Died: February 4, 2015 (aged 85)
- Occupation: Singer-songwriter

Celina González Zamora (16 March 1929 – 4 February 2015) was a Cuban singer-songwriter, who specialized in "música campesina", traditional music of the Cuban countryside. She is best known for co-authoring A Santa Bárbara with her partner Reutilio Domínguez. Her recording of it was a hit, as was Celia Cruz's version. González and Domínguez wrote "Yo soy el punto cubano": the recording was a hit in many countries throughout the world.

González was born in Jovellanos, Matanzas. At age 16, she met Reutilio Domínguez in Santiago de Cuba. He became her singing partner and husband, resulting in a collaboration that lasted until his death in Guantanamo in 1971. In 1948 they began working with the famous guitarist and singer Ñico Saquito and gained increasing popularity on radio, film and television. They performed in New York with Beny Moré and Barbarito Diez. In 1964 the duo stopped performing together and González continued as a soloist. In later years she sang with her son Lázaro, and was usually accompanied by the conjunto Campo Alegre.

Initially, her music was mainly that of the European countryside guajiro (peasant), with lyrics based on the poetics of décima. The musical form was often that of the punto cubano. The relationship with Ñico Saquito taught her a great deal about the son and the guaracha, and her later work made frequent use of those forms.

In 1980 she won Egrem's Disco de Plata award for the album Celina. This was the first of many awards. In 1984 she was awarded the Vanguardia Nacional for her artistic work and won a trip to the Soviet Union and Bulgaria with her son. In 1984 she won the award for Best Singer at the 27th International Music Festival in Cali, Colombia, and after a successful tour in Europe in 1988 she recorded a session for the BBC.

Albums La rica cosecha and Desde La Habana te traigo were well received, and she was nominated, unsuccessfully, for a Grammy in 2001 in the 'Best Traditional Tropical Latin Album' category, for her CD Cincuenta años... como una reina. The album won instead the Cubadisco award for the same year. She died on 4 February 2015, aged 85 in her homeland Cuba.

== Discography ==
Albums

- La Rica Cosecha
- Desde la Habana te Traigo
- Cincuenta Años... Como una Reina

Contributing artist

- The Rough Guide to the Music of Cuba (1998, World Music Network)
