= Juan Martínez Abades =

Spanish painter (1862–1920)

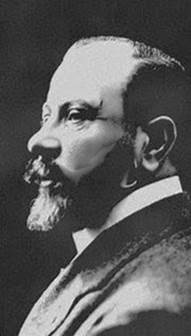
- Born: Juan Martínez Abades; March 7, 1862; Gijón (Asturias), Spain
- Died: January 19, 1920 (aged 57); Madrid, Spain

Juan Martínez Abades (7 March 1862 – 19 January 1920) was a Spanish painter in the Naturalist style, who specialized in seascapes and other maritime scenes from the Cornisa Cantábrica. He was also a talented songwriter and semi-professional singer.

== Biography ==
Abades was born in Gijón. His father was an industrialist and he received his secondary education at the Real Instituto Jovellanos; a school devoted to mining and maritime pursuits founded by Gaspar Melchor de Jovellanos. He first displayed his artistic talents there, copying works from Jovellanos' collection. Later, he went to Madrid, where he studied at the "Escuela Especial de Pintura, Escultura y Grabado" (a branch of the Real Academia de Bellas Artes de San Fernando) from 1880 to 1887. His teachers there included the sculptor, José Gragera and the painter, Ignacio Suárez Llanos.

After graduating, he participated in the National Exhibition of Fine Arts with a historical painting on the death of Messalina. On that basis, he received a travel stipend from the Diputación de Oviedo that enabled him to visit Italy and study at the Accademia di San Luca. In 1890 and 1892, he was awarded second place at the National Exhibition and achieved first-place in 1901.

With the support of Florencio Valdés (1836-1910, industrialist and co-founder of the newspaper El Comercio) he was able to establish himself in Madrid. He participated in every National Exhibition until 1917 and doubled as a composer, occasionally performing his own works. His cuplés have been recorded by, among others, Raquel Meller and Sara Montiel and they appear in the soundtrack of films like The Violet Seller (1958). One of his cuplés, "Los Amores de Ana", recorded numerous times, has been recently recorded by Ana Belén.

From 1894 until his death, he was a frequent contributor of illustrations to the magazine, Blanco y Negro. He also exhibited as far afield as Chicago (World's Columbian Exposition, 1893) and Havana (1914).

His marriage to a woman from the Canary Islands in 1891 led to work decorating the City Hall in Santa Cruz de Tenerife and his maritime paintings came to be very eclectic, encompassing costumbrista-style scenes, ships new and historical, shorebirds and geological formations.

The decline in popularity for these types of paintings after the turn of the century led him to concentrate more on his song writing career although, from 1912 to 1914, he designed a series of calendars that were used by the Spanish Navy. He died in Madrid, aged 57. In 1987, the Museum of Fine Arts of Asturias organized a major travelling retrospective of his works.

== Selected paintings ==
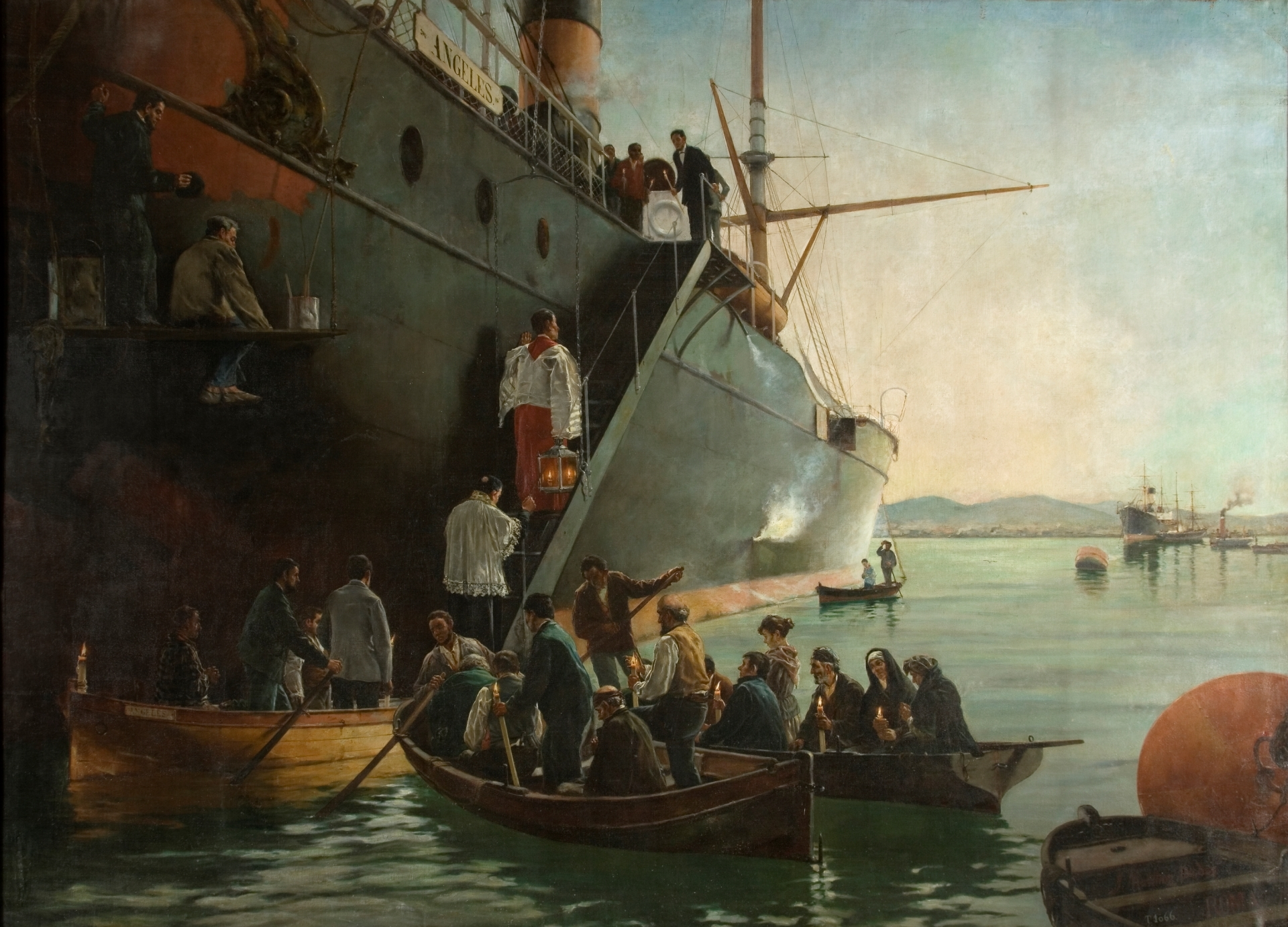
The Viaticum Comes Aboard.
(National Exhibition, 1890)

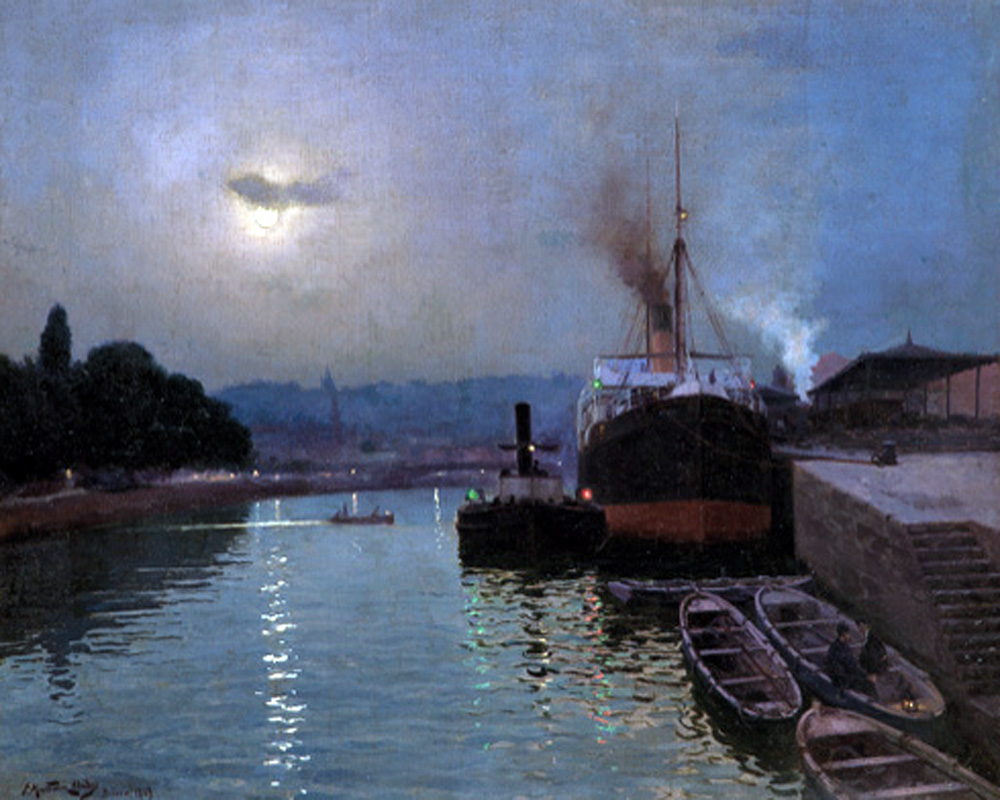
Night at the Port of Bilbao

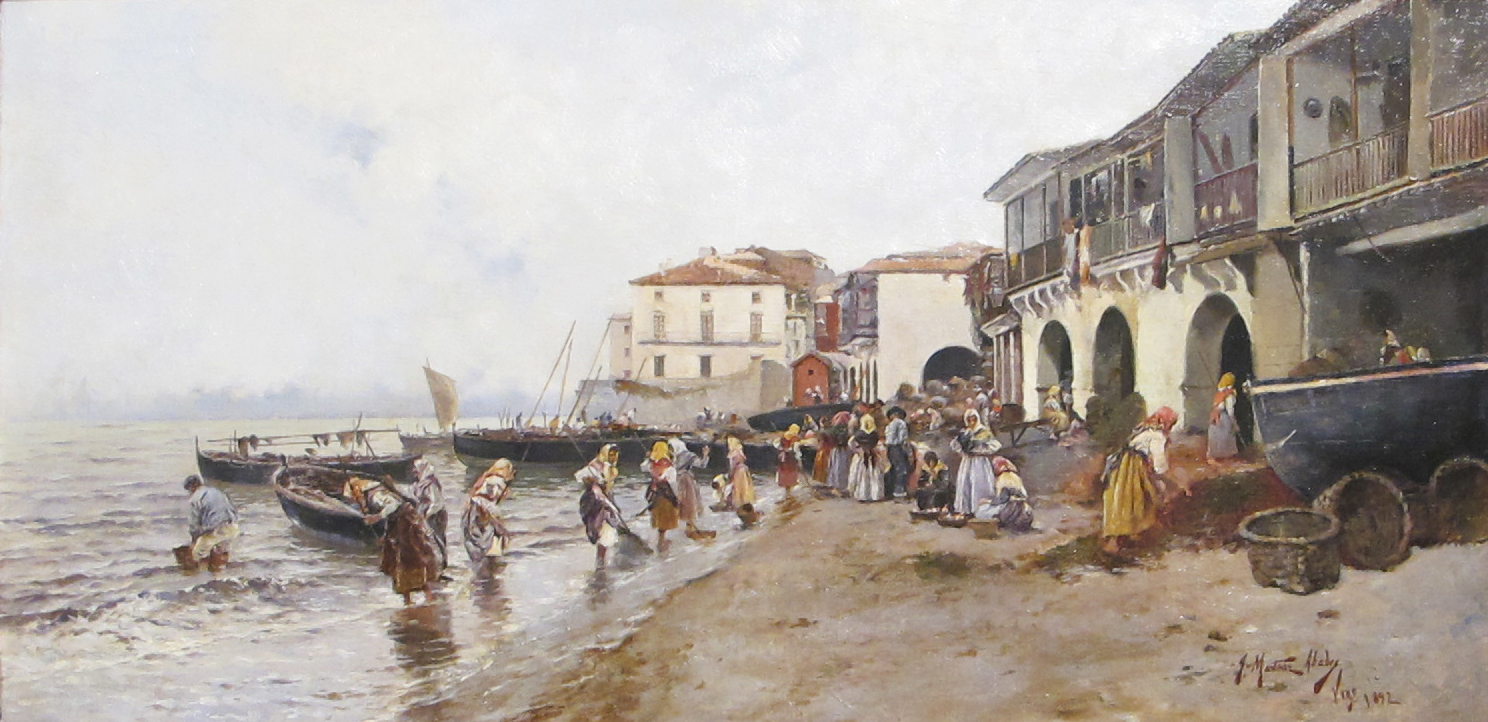
Gathering Seaweed on the Shore at Berbes.
