= Esteban Salas y Castro =

Cuban composer (1725–1803)

Esteban Salas
- Born: 25 December 1725; Havana, Cuba, Spanish Empire
- Died: 14 July 1803 (aged 77); Santiago de Cuba, Cuba, Spanish Empire

Esteban Salas y Castro (December 25, 1725 – July 14, 1803) was a Cuban composer of religious music. His compositions focused chiefly on vocal music, and are a fine representation of the late Baroque style. Although heavily influenced by French and Italian works of the period, his music is considered to incorporate an original Latin American component.

He became a teacher and head of music at the Chapel of Music at the cathedral of Santiago de Cuba from 1764. He also studied theology and canon law and was ordained a priest in Santiago de Cuba in 1790. Salas composed his last carol for Christmas 1801.

Interest in his works was revived during the twentieth century following the rediscovery of many of his scores during the 1940s by the Cuban novelist and musicologist, Alejo Carpentier. Not much is known about his personal life but he was generally described as a man of mixed Spanish and African heritage.

The music conservatory in Santiago de Cuba is named in his honor.
