= Siempre en Mi Corazón—Always in My Heart =

Siempre en Mi Corazón — Always in My Heart: The Songs of Ernesto Lecuona
- 1983 LP cover

Studio album by Plácido Domingo
- Released: 1983
- Genre: Pop music
- Length: 32:14
- Language: Spanish
- Label: CBS Records
- Producer: Milt Okun

Plácido Domingo chronology
Adoro (1982)	Siempre en Mi Corazón — Always in My Heart: The Songs of Ernesto Lecuona (1983)	My Life for a Song (1983)

Alternative cover
- 1997 CD cover

Siempre en Mi Corazón — Always in My Heart: The Songs of Ernesto Lecuona is a studio album recorded by Spanish tenor Plácido Domingo. It was produced by Milt Okun and released by CBS Records in 1983. The album includes songs written by Cuban musician Ernesto Lecuona and won Domingo a Grammy Award for Best Latin Pop Performance in 1985.

== Track listing ==
All tracks written by Ernesto Lecuona.

No.	Title	Length
1.	"Siboney"	3:34
2.	"Noche Azul"	2:49
3.	"Andalucía"	2:48
4.	"Siempre en Mi Corazón"	3:27
5.	"María la O"	3:24
6.	"Karabalí (Canto carabalí)"	3:12
7.	"Juventud"	2:39
8.	"Malagueña"	3:22
9.	"Damisela Encantadora"	3:27
10.	"La Comparsa"	3:32

== Personnel ==
- Plácido Domingo - vocals
- Barry Griffiths - conductor
- Royal Philharmonic Orchestra
- Lee Holdridge - arranger and director
- Alf Clausen - arranger
