= Júrame (María Grever song) =

"Júrame" ("Swear to Me") is a popular song by Mexican composer María Grever. The song has been covered by José Mojica, Juan Camacho, Nelson Ned, Julio Iglesias, Luis Miguel, Plácido Domingo, Andrea Bocelli, and others.
