= Manuel Quiroga (composer) =

Spanish composer

Maestro Quiroga
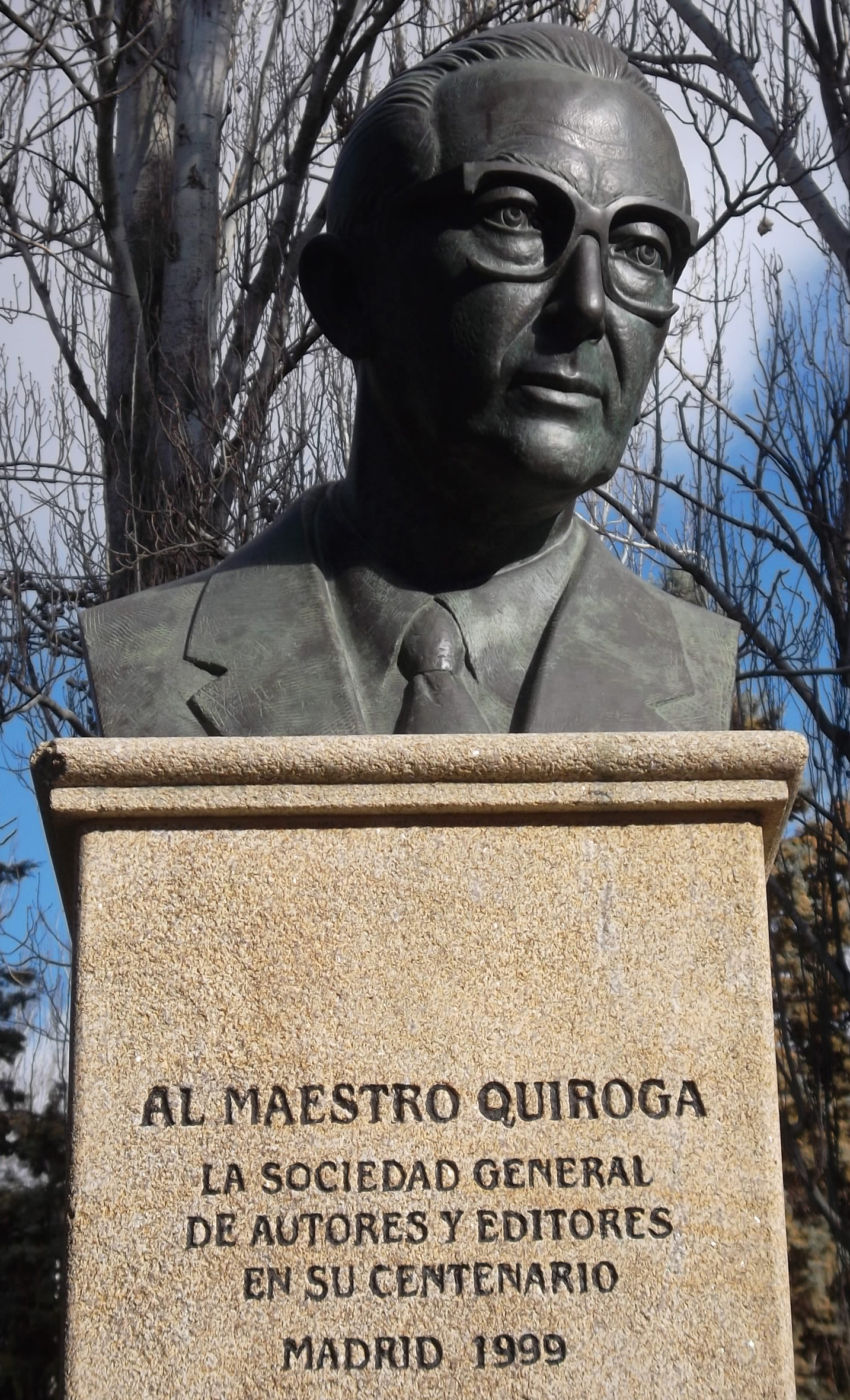
- A bust of Maestro Quiroga in Madrid
- Born: Manuel López-Quiroga Miquel; 30 January 1899; Seville, Spain
- Died: 13 December 1988 (aged 89); Madrid, Spain

Manuel López-Quiroga Miquel (30 January 1899 – 13 December 1988), better known as Maestro Quiroga, was a Spanish composer especially known for his coplas, cuplés, and zarzuelas. He was also a pianist and one of the group of songwriters, Quintero, León and Quiroga, who created some of Spain's most popular and best-known songs from the mid-twentieth century.

== Biography ==
Maestro Quiroga was born in Seville, Spain. In 1934 he began dedicating himself completely to music, giving classes to other new artists and composing. He was a prolific composer, with more than 5,000 works to his name, many of them becoming very popular in the 1940s and 1950s in Spain. As he did not write words, he always surrounded himself with lyricists like Salvador Valverde, Antonio Quintero and Rafael de León. Some of his most popular songs are Tatuaje, Rocio, La Paralla, María de la O, Ojos verdes, Te Lo Juro Yo and La Zarzamora.

He also composed several works for the stage. In 1941, he wrote La reina fea for the zarzuela star soprano, Pepita Embil. Her son, renowned tenor Plácido Domingo, has since recorded several of Quiroga's songs.

Maestro Quiroga died from a pulmonary edema at Virgen del Mar de Madrid clinic on December 13, 1988.

== Compositions ==
=== Works for orchestra ===
- Ojos Verdes
- Rosa de Capuchinos
- Romance de la Otra
- Te he de Querer nientras Viva

=== Works for band ===
- 1935 María de la O, canción-zambra – Text: Salvador Valverde en Rafael de León
- 1946 Suite Andaluza
  1. Noche en Granada
  2. Mezquita (baile)
  3. Bolero flamenco
- 1947 Brisas de Andalucía, suite
  1. Garrotín de Córdoba
  2. Andalucía Mora (Baile)
  3. Maleficio (Danza)
- 1950 Virgen de la Palma, marcha procesional
- 1954 Color Moreno, espectacolo de danza y copla
- 1956 Jaime Ostos, paso-doble
- 1960 Españolerías, paso-doble
- 1980 Una saeta a la Virgen, marcha procesional
- ¡Ay, Maricruz! canción paso-doble – Rafael de León en Salvador Valverde
- Candelaria, marcha procesional
- Capote de grana y. oro, paso-doble – Text: Rafael de León en Antonio Quintero Ranmírez
- Carmen de España, paso-doble – Text: Antonio Quintero Ranmírez en Rafael de León
- Celos zambra – Text: Antonio Quintero Ranmírez en Rafael de León
- Cocidito madrileño, paso-doble – Text: Rafael de León en Antonio Quintero Ranmírez
- Coplas de Luis Candelas, canción paso-doble – Text: Rafael de León
- Francisco Alegre, paso-doble torero – Text: Rafael de León en Antonio Quintero Ranmírez
- La parrala, canción paso-doble – Text: Rafael de León en Arias Saavedra
- La zarzamora marcha-canción – Text: Antonio Quintero Ranmírez en Rafael de León
- Lola puñales, marcha – Text: Antonio Quintero Ranmírez en Rafael de León
- Prisionera de los celos, marcha – Text: Antonio Quintero Ranmírez en Rafael de León
- Suite Gitana
  1. Interludio
  2. Danza del Velorio
  3. Bolero

=== Stage works ===
- La Marquesa chulapa
- Pan y quesillo
- Sevilla, que grande eres

Zarzuelas

- 1918 El Presagio rojo, 1 act – libretto: Fernando Márquez y Tirado and Salvador Videgaín García
- 1921 La Niña de los perros
- 1923 El Cortijo de "Las Matas", 1 act – libretto: Fernando Marquez y Tirado
- 1927 De buena cepa – libretto: Francisco Acebal
- 1935 María de la O
- 1941 La Reina fea, 1 act – libretto: Fernando Márquez y Tirado and Pedro Llabrés Rubio
- 1944 Pepita Romero – libretto: Federico Romero and Guillermo Fernández-Shaw
- 1947 Gloria La Petenera

=== Vocal music ===
- 1962 Contigo nada más, cha-cha-chá – Text: Carlos Salto
- 1963 Don Nicanor, polka-fox (together with: Ramón Cobián) – Text: A. Gîaï Padilla
- 1963 Chupirindango, bossa-nova ritual (together with: Ramón Cobián) – Text: A. Gîaï Padilla
- ¡Ay, macarena!, canción – Text: Rafael de León en Antonio Quintero Ranmírez
- ¡Ay, pena, penita! farruca – Text: Rafael de León en Antonio Quintero Ranmírez
- A la Lima y al Limón
- Aserrín, aserrín, villancicos – Text: Rafael de León en Arias Saavedra
- Ay, Mari Cruz
- Carcelero, carcelero, canción flamenca – Text: Rafael de León en Antonio Quintero Ranmírez
- Doña Sol
- La niña de la estación
- No me llames Dolores O, canción – Text: Rafael de León
- Ojos verdes
- Tatuaje, canción del puerto – Text: Rafael de León, Arias Saavedra en Alejandro Rodríguez Gómez
- Y sin embargo te quiero

== Sources ==
- Maria de los Angeles Pidal Fernandez. El compositor Manuel López-Quiroga.
- Miguel Espín en Romualdo Molina. Quiroga. Un genio sevillano. Fundación Autor, 1999. ISBN 8480482869
