= Arsenio Rodríguez discography =

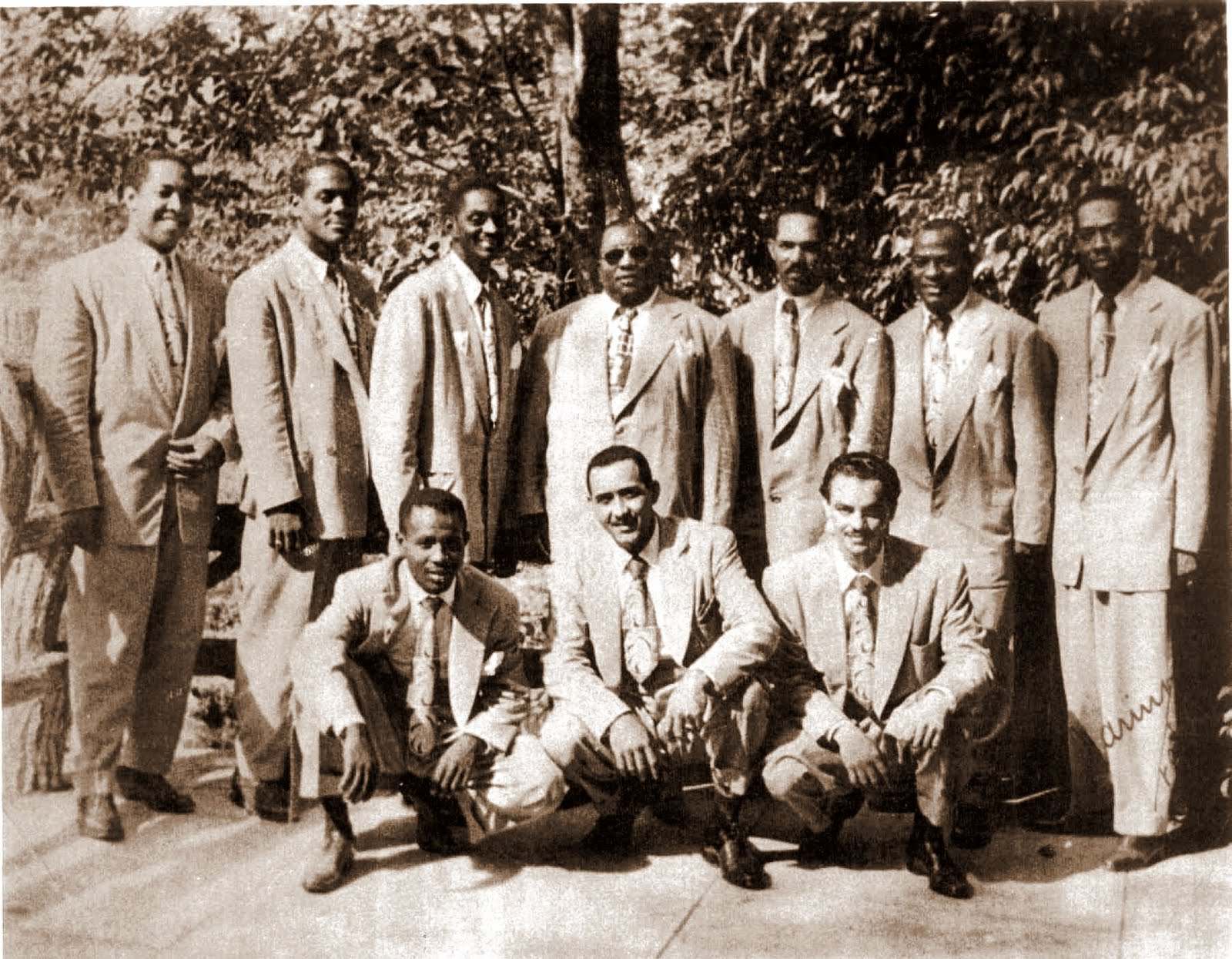
- Arsenio Rodríguez's conjunto ca. 1949.
- Studio albums: 10
- Compilation albums: 24
- Tribute albums: 10+
- Singles: 109

The discography of Arsenio Rodríguez consists of numerous singles released between 1940 and 1956 by Victor, as well as LPs released between 1957 and 1970 by various labels. In addition, there are noncommercial recordings archived at the Center for Folklife Programs and Cultural Studies Archive, Smithsonian Institution.

The first author to elaborate a list including all of Rodríguez's official recordings was American ethnomusicologist David F. García, who published his work in a book entitled Arsenio Rodríguez and the Transnational Flows of Latin Popular Music (Temple University Press, 2006). The book was awarded the Certificate of Merit in the category Best Research in Folk, Ethnic, or World Music by the Association for Recorded Sound Collections in 2007. In addition, Cuban ethnomusicologist Cristóbal Díaz Ayala elaborated a similar list, largely based on García work, as part of his Encyclopedic Discography of Cuban Music 1925-1960 in the Diaz Ayala Cuban and Latin American Popular Music Collection.

Arsenio Rodríguez's recorded material can be divided into two eras. The first era comprises all songs recorded in Havana between 1940 and 1956, which were released as 78 rpm (and also 45 rpm) singles by Victor/RCA Victor. All these tracks except one ("Me quedé sin ti", 23-7000 B) were re-released as a 6-CD boxset in 2008 by the Spanish record label Tumbao Cuban Classics, which had also issued several compilations of this material in the 1990s. The second era comprises all recordings made by Rodríguez in New York between 1950 and 1970, the year of his death. His debut album, Montunos cubanos, was recorded for SMC (New York's Spanish Music Center) in 1950 (or 1953 according to other accounts).

== Singles ==
=== As leader ===
Official singles
| Year | Side | Title | Style | Composer | Label | Session |
|---|---|---|---|---|---|---|
| 1940 | A | El pirulero no vuelve más | pregón | Arsenio Rodríguez | Victor 83314 | 12 September 1940, Havana |
| 1940 | B | Yo 'ta namorá | afro | Arsenio Rodríguez | Victor 83314 | 12 September 1940, Havana |
| 1941 | A | Corazón de hielo | bolero | Arsenio Rodríguez | Victor 83530 | 31 March 1941, Havana |
| 1941 | B | Todos seguimos la conga | conga | Arsenio Rodríguez | Victor 83530 | 31 March 1941, Havana |
| 1941 | A | Yo tuve la culpa | bolero | Arsenio Rodríguez | Victor 83562 | 31 March 1941, Havana |
| 1941 | B | No hace na' la mujer | guaracha | Bienvenido Julián Gutiérrez | Victor 83562 | 31 March 1941, Havana |
| 1941 | A | Llora timbero | rumba | Arsenio Rodríguez | Columbia 30789 | 16 May 1941, Havana |
| 1941 | B | Triste soledad | bolero son | G. García | Columbia 30790 | 16 May 1941, Havana |
| 1941 | A | Si volvieras | bolero son | Lino Frías | Columbia 30794 | 16 May 1941, Havana |
| 1941 | B | El dulcero de Güines | pregón | Arsenio Rodríguez | Columbia 30795 | 16 May 1941, Havana |
| 1942 | A | Sediento de amor | bolero son | Jacinto Scull | Victor 83948 | 18 June 1942, Havana |
| 1942 | B | Cómo traigo la yuca | guaracha | Arsenio Rodríguez | Victor 83948 | 18 June 1942, Havana |
| 1942 | A | Con un solo pie | conga | Bienvenido Julián Gutiérrez | Victor 83963 | 18 June 1942, Havana |
| 1942 | B | Intranquilidad | bolero son | Marcelino Guerra | Victor 83963 | 24 June 1942, Havana |
| 1943 | A | Sin tu querer | bolero son | Pablo Cairo | RCA Victor 23-0050 | 14 September 1943, Havana |
| 1943 | B | Sandunguera | guaracha | Luis Piedra, Marcelino Guerra | RCA Victor 23-0050 | 14 September 1943, Havana |
| 1943 | A | Triste lucha | bolero son | Arsenio Rodríguez | RCA Victor 23-0061 | 14 September 1943, Havana |
| 1943 | B | Ñaña seré | guaracha | Arsenio Rodríguez, Guillermo Valdés | RCA Victor 23-0061 | 21 September 1943, Havana |
| 1943 | A | ¡So, caballo! | son montuno | Arsenio Rodríguez | RCA Victor 23-0076 | 7 December 1943, Havana |
| 1943 | B | A buscar camarón | son montuno | Arsenio Rodríguez | RCA Victor 23-0076 | 29 November 1943, Havana |
| 1943 | A | Oye cómo dice | guaracha | Félix Chappottín | RCA Victor 23-0078 | 29 November 1943, Havana |
| 1943 | B | ¿Quién será mi amor? | bolero son | Marcelino Guerra | RCA Victor 23-0078 | 16 November 1943, Havana |
| 1943 | A | Pilla con pilla | guaracha rumba | Guillermo Valdés | RCA Victor 23-0082 | 29 November 1943, Havana |
| 1943 | B | Camina a trabajá, haragán | son montuno | Arsenio Rodríguez | RCA Victor 23-0082 | 16 November 1943, Havana |
| 1944 | A | Mi chinita me botó | son guajiro | Arsenio Rodríguez | RCA Victor 23-0173 | 6 July 1944, Havana |
| 1944 | B | Quien ama no traiciona | bolero son | Arsenio Rodríguez | RCA Victor 23-0173 | 6 July 1944, Havana |
| 1944 | A | Estás equivocada | bolero son | Osvaldo Farrés | RCA Victor 23-0182 | 6 July 1944, Havana |
| 1944 | B | Mujeres, enamórenme | guaracha | Arsenio Rodríguez | RCA Victor 23-0182 | 6 July 1944, Havana |
| 1944 | A | Oye mi consejo | bolero son | Arsenio Rodríguez | RCA Victor 23-0193 | 6 July 1944, Havana |
| 1944 | B | Yo no como corazón de chivo | guaracha son | Arsenio Rodríguez | RCA Victor 23-0193 | 6 July 1944, Havana |
| 1945 | A | Yeyey | pregón | Emilio Sanso, O. Gainza | RCA Victor 23-0350 | 5 July 1945, Havana |
| 1945 | B | Mi guane | guajira | Rafael López | RCA Victor 23-0350 | 5 July 1945, Havana |
| 1945 | A | Tú no eres culpable | bolero | Pepe Robles, Marcelino Guerra | RCA Victor 23-0362 | 5 July 1945, Havana |
| 1945 | B | Timbilla | rumba de cajón | Arsenio Rodríguez | RCA Victor 23-0362 | 5 July 1945, Havana |
| 1945 | A | Agonía | bolero | Arsenio Rodríguez | RCA Victor 23-0373 | 5 July 1945, Havana |
| 1945 | B | Nadie más que tú | bolero | Jacinto Scull | RCA Victor 23-0373 | 5 July 1945, Havana |
| 1945 | A | No hay yaya sin guayacán | son montuno | Arsenio Rodríguez | RCA Victor 23-0401 | 27 November 1945, Havana |
| 1945 | B | Ya lo verás | bolero | Arsenio Rodríguez | RCA Victor 23-0401 | 27 November 1945, Havana |
| 1945 | A | Inspiración | bolero | Pedro Pablo Pérez Chorot | RCA Victor 23-0428 | 27 November 1945, Havana |
| 1945 | B | El último amor | bolero | Arsenio Rodríguez | RCA Victor 23-0428 | 27 November 1945, Havana |
| 1945 | A | Deuda | bolero | Luis Marquetti | RCA Victor 23-0452 | 27 November 1945, Havana |
| 1945 | B | Canta, montero | son montuno | Arsenio Rodríguez | RCA Victor 23-0452 | 27 November 1945, Havana |
| 1946 | A | El reloj de Pastora | son montuno | Arsenio Rodríguez | RCA Victor 23-0470 | 21 June 1946, Havana |
| 1946 | B | Cangrejo fue a estudiar | son montuno | Arsenio Rodríguez | RCA Victor 23-0470 | 21 June 1946, Havana |
| 1946 | A | Chicharronero | son montuno | Lilí Martínez | RCA Victor 23-0492 | 21 June 1946, Havana |
| 1946 | B | Dame un cachito pa' huelé | son montuno | Arsenio Rodríguez | RCA Victor 23-0492 | 21 June 1946, Havana |
| 1946 | A | Una experiencia más | bolero | Arsenio Rodríguez | RCA Victor 23-0519 | 21 June 1946, Havana |
| 1946 | B | Cero guapos en Yateras | son montuno | Lilí Martínez | RCA Victor 23-0519 | 21 June 1946, Havana |
| 1947 | A | Celos de mujer | guaracha | Arsenio Rodríguez | RCA Victor 23-0655 | 13 December 1946, Havana |
| 1947 | B | Juventud amaliana | guaguancó | Arsenio Rodríguez | RCA Victor 23-0655 | 13 December 1946, Havana |
| 1947 | A | ¿Por qué la trajiste? | bolero son | Arsenio Rodríguez | RCA Victor 23-0734 | 13 December 1946, Havana |
| 1947 | B | Soy el terror | son montuno | Arsenio Rodríguez | RCA Victor 23-0734 | 10 January 1947, Havana |
| 1947 | A | Tengo que olvidarte | bolero son | Jacinto Scull | RCA Victor 23-0755 | 13 December 1946, Havana |
| 1947 | B | Semilla de caña brava | guaracha | Lilí Martínez | RCA Victor 23-0755 | 13 December 1946, Havana |
| 1947 | A | Mi convicción | bolero son | Lilí Martínez | RCA Victor 23-0766 | 10 January 1947, Havana |
| 1947 | B | Adivínalo | guaracha | José Luis Forest | RCA Victor 23-0766 | 10 January 1947, Havana |
| 1948 | A | Lo dicen todas | guaracha | Arsenio Rodríguez | RCA Victor 23-0828 | 27 February 1948, Havana |
| 1948 | B | La vida es un sueño | bolero | Arsenio Rodríguez | RCA Victor 23-0828 | 27 February 1948, Havana |
| 1948 | A | Yo no engaño a las nenas | son montuno | Arsenio Rodríguez | SMC 1205 | March 1948, Havana |
| 1948 | B | Tocoloro | son montuno | Arsenio Rodríguez | SMC 1205 | March 1948, Havana |
| 1948 | A | Tumba palo cucuyé | son montuno | Arsenio Rodríguez | SMC 1206 | March 1948, Havana |
| 1948 | B | Tintorera ya llegó | son montuno | Arsenio Rodríguez | SMC 1206 | March 1948, Havana |
| 1948 | A | El Cerro tiene la llave | guaracha | Fernando Noa | RCA Victor 23-0888 | 8 April 1948, Havana |
| 1948 | B | El tabernero | bolero | Rafael Ortiz | RCA Victor 23-0888 | 8 April 1948, Havana |
| 1948 | A | Te esperaré | bolero son | Lilí Martínez | RCA Victor 23-0897 | 8 April 1948, Havana |
| 1948 | B | No vuelvo a Morón | son montuno | Otilio Portal | RCA Victor 23-0897 | 8 April 1948, Havana |
| 1948 | A | Soy tu destino | bolero | Isolina Carrillo | RCA Victor 23-0946 | 26 March 1948, Havana |
| 1948 | B | Esa china tiene coímbre | son montuno | Arsenio Rodríguez | RCA Victor 23-0946 | 26 March 1948, Havana |
| 1948 | A | Me siento muy solo | bolero | Arsenio Rodríguez | RCA Victor 23-0975 | 22 June 1948, Havana |
| 1948 | B | No toque el guao | son montuno | Arsenio Rodríguez | RCA Victor 23-0975 | 22 June 1948, Havana |
| 1948 | A | A Puerto Rico | bolero | Arsenio Rodríguez | RCA Victor 23-0995 | 22 June 1948, Havana |
| 1948 | B | Sacando candela | guaracha | Gervasio Kessell | RCA Victor 23-0995 | 1 June 1948, Havana |
| 1948 | A | Monte adentro | son montuno | Arsenio Rodríguez | SMC 1209 | July 1948, Havana |
| 1948 | B | Apurrúñenme mujeres | son montuno | Arsenio Rodríguez | SMC 1209 | July 1948, Havana |
| 1948 | A | Ya me lo dio | son montuno | Arsenio Rodríguez | SMC 1210 | July 1948, Havana |
| 1948 | B | Masango | son montuno | Arsenio Rodríguez | SMC 1210 | July 1948, Havana |
| 1948 | A | A Belén le toca ahora | guaguancó | Arsenio Rodríguez | RCA Victor 23-1072 | 19 October 1948, Havana |
| 1948 | B | Los tres Juanes | bolero | Bienvenido Julián Gutiérrez | RCA Victor 23-1072 | 19 October 1948, Havana |
| 1948 | A | Luna al amanecer | bolero | Lilí Martínez | RCA Victor 23-1105 | 27 October 1948, Havana |
| 1948 | B | Lo que dice usted | son montuno | Jesús Guerra | RCA Victor 23-1105 | 28 October 1948, Havana |
| 1948 | A | Orgullo inútil | bolero | Rosendo Ruiz Jr. | RCA Victor 23-1130 | 27 October 1948, Havana |
| 1948 | B | Dame un besito | son montuno | Arsenio Rodríguez | RCA Victor 23-1130 | 27 October 1948, Havana |
| 1949 | A | Feliz viaje | bolero | Arsenio Rodríguez | RCA Victor 23-1147 | 12 January 1949, Havana |
| 1949 | B | No me llores más | son montuno | Lilí Martínez | RCA Victor 23-1147 | 12 January 1949, Havana |
| 1949 | A | Flor del fango | bolero | Cristóbal Dobal | RCA Victor 23-1171 | 28 January 1949, Havana |
| 1949 | B | Qué cosas tendrán las mujeres | son montuno | Lilí Martínez | RCA Victor 23-1171 | 28 January 1949, Havana |
| 1949 | A | Pueblo Nuevo se pasó | guaguancó | Lilí Martínez | RCA Victor 23-1180 | 19 February 1949, Havana |
| 1949 | B | En su partir | bolero | Jacinto Scull | RCA Victor 23-1180 | 19 February 1949, Havana |
| 1949 | A | Llévatelo todo | son montuno | Lilí Martínez | RCA Victor 23-1194 | 19 February 1949, Havana |
| 1949 | B | Mírame más | bolero | Enrique Hernández | RCA Victor 23-1194 | 19 February 1949, Havana |
| 1949 | A | Me boté de guano | son montuno | Alfredo "Chocolate" Armenteros | RCA Victor 23-1336 | 2 August 1949, Havana |
| 1949 | B | Es mejor olvidarte | bolero | René Scull | RCA Victor 23-1336 | 2 August 1949, Havana |
| 1949 | A | Finaliza un amor | bolero | Raúl Díaz | RCA Victor 23-1367 | 19 August 1949, Havana |
| 1949 | B | El palo tiene curujey | son montuno | Pascual Bueno Griñán | RCA Victor 23-1367 | 19 August 1949, Havana |
| 1949 | A | Los Sitios, acere | guaguancó | Silvio A. Pino | RCA Victor 23-1382 | 6 September 1949, Havana |
| 1949 | B | Sagrado amor | bolero | Lázaro Prieto | RCA Victor 23-1382 | 6 September 1949, Havana |
| 1950 | A | Dundunbanza | son montuno | Arsenio Rodríguez | RCA Victor 23-1488 | 29 December 1949, Havana |
| 1950 | B | Flor de canela | bolero | Arsenio Rodríguez | RCA Victor 23-1488 | 29 December 1949, Havana |
| 1950 | A | Pero yo no sé | bolero | Félix Chappottín | RCA Victor 23-1504 | 13 January 1950, Havana |
| 1950 | B | Juventud de Colón | guaguancó | Federico Gayle Suárez | RCA Victor 23-1504 | 13 January 1950, Havana |
| 1950 | A | No puedo comer vistagacha | guaracha | Arsenio Rodríguez | RCA Victor 23-1518 | 26 January 1950, Havana |
| 1950 | B | Por tu bien | bolero | Lilí Martínez | RCA Victor 23-1518 | 26 January 1950, Havana |
| 1950 | A | Kila, Quique y Chocolate | son montuno | Arsenio Rodríguez | RCA Victor 23-1583 | 29 March 1950, Havana |
| 1950 | B | Vuelvo a la vida | bolero | Arsenio Rodríguez | RCA Victor 23-1583 | 29 March 1950, Havana |
| 1950 | A | El rumbón de Luyanó | guaguancó | Lázaro Prieto | RCA Victor 23-1591 | 19 April 1950, Havana |
| 1950 | B | Recuerda aquella noche | bolero | Arsenio Rodríguez | RCA Victor 23-1591 | 19 April 1950, Havana |
| 1950 | A | El rincón caliente | guaguancó | Arsenio Rodríguez | RCA Victor 23-1604 | 24 April 1950, Havana |
| 1950 | B | Qué susto | bolero | Arsenio Rodríguez | RCA Victor 23-1604 | 24 April 1950, Havana |
| 1950 | A | La sandunga del son | son montuno | Raul Díaz | RCA Victor 23-5205 | 29 June 1950, Havana |
| 1950 | B | Con reciprocidad | bolero | Bienvenido Julián Gutiérrez | RCA Victor 23-5205 | 29 June 1950, Havana |
| 1950 | A | Anabacoa | guaracha | Juanchín Ramírez | RCA Victor 23-5209 | 8 August 1950, Havana |
| 1950 | B | Cárdenas | bolero | Arsenio Rodríguez | RCA Victor 23-5209 | 8 August 1950, Havana |
| 1950 | A | Todo terminó | bolero | Arsenio Rodríguez | RCA Victor 23-5219 | 12 September 1950, Havana |
| 1950 | B | Juventud de Cayo Hueso | guaguancó | Arsenio Rodríguez | RCA Victor 23-5219 | 12 September 1950, Havana |
| 1950 | A | Con un amor se borra otro amor | son montuno | Arsenio Rodríguez | RCA Victor 23-5237 | 12 September 1950, Havana |
| 1950 | B | Ten valor | bolero | Arsenio Rodríguez | RCA Victor 23-5237 | 12 September 1950, Havana |
| 1950 | A | Ta Benito | afro | Arsenio Rodríguez | RCA Victor 23-5299 | 9 November 1950, Havana |
| 1950 | B | Aquí como allá | lamento | Arsenio Rodríguez | RCA Victor 23-5299 | 9 November 1950, Havana |
| 1950 | A | Te mantengo y no quieres | son montuno | Rafael Ortiz | RCA Victor 23-5300 | 9 November 1950, Havana |
| 1950 | B | Cree lo que tú quieras | bolero | Jacinto Scull | RCA Victor 23-5300 | 9 November 1950, Havana |
| 1950 | A | El que no tiene no vale | bolero son | Félix Chappottín | RCA Victor 23-5304 | 15 November 1950, Havana |
| 1950 | B | Quizás con los años | bolero | Lázaro Prieto | RCA Victor 23-5304 | 15 November 1950, Havana |
| 1951 | A | Me dijo que sí y le dije que no | son montuno | Arsenio Rodríguez | RCA Victor 23-5365 | 13 February 1951, Havana |
| 1951 | B | Falso desprecio | bolero | Antonio Alonso | RCA Victor 23-5365 | 13 February 1951, Havana |
| 1951 | A | Caminante y laborí | son montuno | Arsenio Rodríguez | RCA Victor 23-5383 | 6 March 1951, Havana |
| 1951 | B | Jamás te perdonaré | bolero | Enrique Pérez Poey | RCA Victor 23-5383 | 6 March 1951, Havana |
| 1951 | A | Tu faz morena | bolero | Juan Limonta | RCA Victor 23-5405 | 3 April 1951, Havana |
| 1951 | B | Jumba | son montuno | Arsenio Rodríguez | RCA Victor 23-5405 | 3 April 1951, Havana |
| 1951 | A | Murumba | rezo negro | Félix Chappottín | RCA Victor 23-5432 | 1 May 1951, Havana |
| 1951 | B | Negrita | guajira son | Marcelino Guerra | RCA Victor 23-5432 | 1 May 1951, Havana |
| 1951 | A | Amores de verano | guaguancó | Arsenio Rodríguez | RCA Victor 23-5461 | 29 May 1951, Havana |
| 1951 | B | Te contaré | bolero | Arsenio Rodríguez | RCA Victor 23-5461 | 29 May 1951, Havana |
| 1951 | A | Amor en cenizas | bolero | Arsenio Rodríguez | RCA Victor 23-5481 | 22 June 1951, Havana |
| 1951 | B | Mira... cuidadito | son montuno | Arsenio Rodríguez | RCA Victor 23-5481 | 22 June 1951, Havana |
| 1951 | A | A Graciela | bolero | Arsenio Rodríguez | RCA Victor 23-5520 | 14 August 1951, Havana |
| 1951 | B | Mira que soy chambelón | son montuno | Arsenio Rodríguez | RCA Victor 23-5520 | 14 August 1951, Havana |
| 1951 | A | Pobre mi Cuba | lamento guajiro | Arsenio Rodríguez | RCA Victor 23-5593 | 25 October 1951, Havana |
| 1951 | B | Guaragüí | son montuno | Arsenio Rodríguez | RCA Victor 23-5593 | 25 October 1951, Havana |
| 1952 | A | Ya se fue | bolero | Marcelino Guerra | RCA Victor 23-5624 | 11 December 1951, Havana |
| 1952 | B | Amor a mi patria | lamento | Arsenio Rodríguez | RCA Victor 23-5624 | 11 December 1951, Havana |
| 1952 | A | Esclavo triste | lamento | Arsenio Rodríguez | Tico 10-040 | c. 1951, New York |
| 1952 | B | La gente del Bronx | guaguancó | Arsenio Rodríguez | Tico 10-040 | c. 1951, New York |
| 1952 | A | Mulence | guaguancó | Arsenio Rodríguez | Tico 10-041 | c. 1951, New York |
| 1952 | B | Pa' que gozen | mambo son | Arsenio Rodríguez | Tico 10-041 | c. 1951, New York |
| 1952 | A | Jagüey | son montuno | Arsenio Rodríguez | Tico 10-074 | c. 1951, New York |
| 1952 | B | Meta y guaguancó | guaguancó | Arsenio Rodríguez | Tico 10-074 | c. 1951, New York |
| 1952 | A | Esas no | son montuno | Arsenio Rodríguez | Tico 10-075 | c. 1951, New York |
| 1952 | B | Cómo se goza en El Barrio | guaguancó | Arsenio Rodríguez | Tico 10-075 | c. 1951, New York |
| 1952 | A | Burundanga | montuno afro | Félix Chappottín | RCA Victor 23-5644 | 22 January 1952, Havana |
| 1952 | B | Injusta duda | bolero canción | Enrique González | RCA Victor 23-5644 | 22 January 1952, Havana |
| 1952 | A | Mi conuco | guajira son | Arsenio Rodríguez | RCA Victor 23-5694 | 18 March 1952, Havana |
| 1952 | B | Pogolotti | guaguancó | Eloy Oliva | RCA Victor 23-5694 | 18 March 1952, Havana |
| 1952 | A | Yo soy chambelón | son montuno | Arsenio Rodríguez | Tico 10-120 | c. 1952, New York |
| 1952 | B | Arpegio por Arsenio | tres solo | Arsenio Rodríguez | Tico 10-120 | c. 1952, New York |
| 1952 | A | Swing y son | swing-son | Arsenio Rodríguez | Tico 10-121 | c. 1952, New York |
| 1952 | B | Maye santa | son montuno | Arsenio Rodríguez | Tico 10-121 | c. 1952, New York |
| 1952 | A | Oiga mi guaguancó | guaguancó | Arsenio Rodríguez | Tico 10-122 | c. 1952, New York |
| 1952 | B | Se va el comparsa | conga | Arsenio Rodríguez | Tico 10-122 | c. 1952, New York |
| 1952 | A | Oye mi cantar | guajira | Arsenio Rodríguez | Tico 10-123 | c. 1952, New York |
| 1952 | B | Ahora capetillo | son capetillo | Arsenio Rodríguez | Tico 10-123 | c. 1952, New York |
| 1952 | A | No quiero | son capetillo | Israel Rodríguez | Seeco Ex 20-334 | 9 April 1952, New York |
| 1952 | B | Si me voy | bolero | Israel Rodríguez | Seeco Ex 20-334 | 9 April 1952, New York |
| 1952 | A | Besarte quisiera | bolero rítmico | Israel Rodríguez | Seeco Ex 20-335 | 9 April 1952, New York |
| 1952 | B | Se formó el bochinche | son montuno | Israel Rodríguez | Seeco Ex 20-335 | 9 April 1952, New York |
| 1952 | A | Sólo fue un sueño | bolero | Felipe Goyco | Seeco Ex 20-347 | 27 June 1952, New York |
| 1952 | B | El dolorcito de mi china | son capetillo | Israel Rodríguez | Seeco Ex 20-347 | 27 June 1952, New York |
| 1952 | A | Hipocresía | bolero | Israel Rodríguez | Seeco Ex 20-348 | 27 June 1952, New York |
| 1952 | B | Cambia el paso | son capetillo | Israel Rodríguez | Seeco Ex 20-348 | 27 June 1952, New York |
| 1952 | A | Juégame limpio | son capetillo | Arsenio Rodríguez | Seeco Ex 20-369 | 12 September 1952, New York |
| 1952 | B | Vive en el recuerdo | bolero | Arsenio Rodríguez | Seeco Ex 20-369 | 12 September 1952, New York |
| 1952 | A | Ya voló | conga | Neno González | Seeco Ex 20-370 | 12 September 1952, New York |
| 1952 | B | Se ama una vez | bolero | Arsenio Rodríguez | Seeco Ex 20-370 | 12 September 1952, New York |
| 1953 | A | Pobre chinito | mambo | Israel Rodríguez | Seeco Ex 20-385 | 2 April 1953, New York |
| 1953 | B | Baila Simón | son montuno | Israel Rodríguez | Seeco Ex 20-385 | 2 April 1953, New York |
| 1953 | A | Que me mande la niña | son mambo | Israel Rodríguez | Seeco Ex 20-386 | 2 April 1953, New York |
| 1953 | B | Pimienta | son capetillo | Israel Rodríguez | Seeco Ex 20-386 | 2 April 1953, New York |
| 1955 | A | Mambo abacuá | mambo | Arsenio Rodríguez | RCA Victor 23-6696 | 16 March 1955, New York |
| 1955 | B | Mi primer cariño | cha cha chá | Arsenio Rodríguez | RCA Victor 23-6696 | 16 March 1955, New York |
| 1955 | A | Acerca el oído | bolero | Arsenio Rodríguez | RCA Victor 23-6734 | 16 March 1955, New York |
| 1955 | B | Mambo en la cueva | mambo | Tata Gutiérrez | RCA Victor 23-6734 | 16 March 1955, New York |
| 1955 | A | Me estoy comiendo un cable | guaracha | Arsenio Rodríguez | RCA Victor 23-6811 | 21 June 1955, New York |
| 1955 | B | Cuba cha cha chá | cha cha chá | Arsenio Rodríguez | RCA Victor 23-6811 | 21 June 1955, New York |
| 1955 | A | Sobre el arco iris | cha cha chá | Harold Arlen, Yip Harburg | RCA Victor 23-6840 | 21 June 1955, New York |
| 1955 | B | Confórmate | guaguancó | Arsenio Rodríguez | RCA Victor 23-6840 | 21 June 1955, New York |
| 1955 | A | Présteme el cubo | son capetillo | Arsenio Rodríguez | Verne V-0996 | 1955, New York |
| 1955 | B | Qué habrá pasado | cha cha chá bolero | Arsenio Rodríguez | Verne V-0996 | 1955, New York |
| 1955 | A | Suéltame | mambo cha cha chá | Arsenio Rodríguez | Verne V-0997 | 1955, New York |
| 1955 | B | No nos entendemos | cha cha chá bolero | Arsenio Rodríguez | Verne V-0997 | 1955, New York |
| 1955 | A | Cruel destino | bolero son | Chicho Ibáñez | Capia 100 | 1955, New York |
| 1955 | B | Emilia Dolores | plena | Arsenio Rodríguez | Capia 100 | 1955, New York |
| 1956 | A | Que negra m'acelerá | rumba | Arsenio Rodríguez | RCA Victor 23-6985 | 16 April 1956, Havana |
| 1956 | B | Graciela, tú lo sabes | cha cha chá | Arsenio Rodríguez | RCA Victor 23-6985 | 16 April 1956, Havana |
| 1956 | A | Titi, tu kundungo quiere papa | cha cha chá | Arsenio Rodríguez | RCA Victor 23-6970 | 16 April 1956, Havana |
| 1956 | B | Lo sabía | bolero | Arsenio Rodríguez | RCA Victor 23-6970 | 16 April 1956, Havana |
| 1956 | A | Ayaca de maíz | son pregón | Silvano "Chori" Shueg | RCA Victor 23-7000 | 16 April 1956, Havana |
| 1956 | B | Me quedé sin ti | bolero | Arsenio Rodríguez | RCA Victor 23-7000 | 16 April 1956, Havana |
| 1956 | A | Adiós roncona | columbia matancera | Arsenio Rodríguez | RCA Victor 23-7120 | 5 November 1956, Havana |
| 1956 | B | Con flores del matadero | guaguancó | Arsenio Rodríguez | RCA Victor 23-7120 | 5 November 1956, Havana |
| 1956 | A | Triste lucha | bolero | Arsenio Rodríguez | RCA Victor 23-7129 | 5 November 1956, Havana |
| 1956 | B | Dame to yoyo ma Belén | son montuno | Arsenio Rodríguez | RCA Victor 23-7129 | 5 November 1956, Havana |
| 1956 | A | Contigo no soy feliz | bolero | Jacinto Scull | RCA Victor 23-7140 | 5 November 1956, Havana |
| 1956 | B | Casera mire qué caña | son pregón | Arsenio Rodríguez | RCA Victor 23-7140 | 5 November 1956, Havana |
| 1957 | A | Blanca paloma | guapachá | Arsenio Rodríguez | Puchito 344 | 1957, New York |
| 1957 | B | Adórenla como a Martí | bolero | Arsenio Rodríguez | Puchito 344 | 1957, New York |
| 1957 | A | Carraguao alante | son montuno | Arsenio Rodríguez | Puchito 393 | 1957, New York |
| 1957 | B | Hay fuego en el 23 | son montuno | Arsenio Rodríguez | Puchito 393 | 1957, New York |
| 1957 | A | La fonda de Bienvenido | guaguancó | Bienvenido Julián Gutiérrez | Puchito 583 | 1957, New York |
| 1957 | B | Mami me gustó | son montuno | Arsenio Rodríguez | Puchito 583 | 1957, New York |
| 1960 | A | Curazao | bolero-chá | Arsenio Rodríguez | Grabaciones Angel Job 45-6008 | 1960, New York |
| 1960 | B | Son montuno en Curazao | son montuno | Arsenio Rodríguez | Grabaciones Angel Job 45-6008 | 1960, New York |

=== As sideman ===
With Chano Pozo
| Year | Side | Title | Style | Composer | Label | Session |
|---|---|---|---|---|---|---|
| 1947 | A | Cómetelo todo | guaracha | Chano Pozo | Coda 5053 | 7 February 1947, New York |
| 1947 | B | Pasó en Tampa | guaracha | Arsenio Rodríguez | Coda 5053 | 7 February 1947, New York |
| 1947 | A | Porque tú sufres | guaracha | Chano Pozo | Coda 5057 | 7 February 1947, New York |
| 1947 | B | Rumba en swing | guaracha | Chano Pozo | Coda 5057 | 7 February 1947, New York |
| 1947 | A | Serende | guaguancó | Chano Pozo | Coda 5059 | 10 February 1947, New York |
| 1947 | B | Seven, Seven | son montuno | Chano Pozo | Coda 5059 | 10 February 1947, New York |
| 1947 | A | Contéstame | bolero | Arsenio Rodríguez | Coda 5061 | 10 February 1947, New York |
| 1947 | B | Sácale brillo al piso | son montuno | Arsenio Rodríguez | Coda 5061 | 10 February 1947, New York |

== Studio albums ==
=== As leader ===
Official studio albums
| Year | Title | Label | Format | Session |
|---|---|---|---|---|
| 1950 | Montunos cubanos (Cuban Off-Beat) | SMC Pro-Arte SMC-508 (US) | 10" LP | 10 May 1950, New York |
| 1957 | Sabroso y caliente | Puchito/Antilla MLP-586 (US); Issued in Cuba as Arsenio (Puchito SP-105); Reissued on CD as Antilla CD-586 | LP | 1957, New York |
| 1960 | Arsenio Rodríguez y su Conjunto | Ansonia Records (S)ALP 1337 (US); Reissued on CD as Ansonia HGCD 1337 in 1993 | LP | 1959-60, New York |
| 1960 | Cumbanchando con Arsenio (Fiesta en Harlem) | SMC Pro-Arte SMC-1074 (US) | LP | 1960, New York |
| 1962 | Arsenio Rodríguez y su Conjunto Vol. 2 | Ansonia Records (S)ALP 1418 (US); Reissued on CD as Ansonia CD-1418 in 1999 | LP | 1960-62, New York |
| 1963 | Quindembo · Afro Magic · La Magia de Arsenio Rodríguez | Epic LN/BN 24072 (US); Reissued in 1973 as La música afro cubana: Arsenio y su magia (Caliente CLT-7049); Reissued on CD by Sony Music in 1995 | LP | May–June 1963, New York |
| 1963 | La pachanga | Tico TRSLP-1092 (US); Reissued in France in 1979 (Occidente LP-106); Reissued on CD by Tico in 1999 | LP | 1963, New York |
| 1965 | Primitivo | Roost (S)LP-2261 (US); Reissued in 1968 as Arsenio y Kike/Canta Monguito (Tico LP-1173); Reissued on CD as Blues Interactions PCD-4729 in 1995 (Japan), and Tico SLP-1173 in 1999 (US) | LP | 1958-1963, New York |
| 1967 | Viva Arsenio! | Bang BLPS-216 (US) | LP | 1966, New York |
| 1968 | Arsenio dice | Tico LP-1175 (US) | LP | 1968, New York |

=== As sideman ===
| Year | Primary artist | Title | Label | Format | Session |
|---|---|---|---|---|---|
| 1957 | Sabú Martínez | Palo Congo | Blue Note BLP 1561 (US) | LP | 27 April 1957, New York |
| 1967 | Carlos "Patato" Valdés & Eugenio "Totico" Arango | Patato y Totico | Verve V6-5037 (US) | LP | 19 September 1967, New York |
| 1995 | Cándido Antomattei | Cándido con Arsenio Rodríguez y Estrellas | Faisán FCD-512 (US) | CD | 1960s; San Juan, New York, Havana |

== Compilation albums ==
Official compilation albums
| Year | Title | Label | Format |
|---|---|---|---|
| 1955 | Authentic Cuban Mambos Vol. 1 | Tico 135 (US) | 10" LP |
| 1955 | Authentic Cuban Mambos Vol. 2 | Tico 136 (US) | 10" LP |
| 1956 | Selecciones favoritas de Cuba | Seeco SLP 66 (US) | 10" LP |
| 1958 | Éxitos de Arsenio Rodríguez y su conjunto | Tropical TRLP-5005 (US); Reissued on CD as Clásicas de un sonero (Seeco SCCD-7352) in 1998 | LP |
| 1958 | Boogaloo con los tres grandes | Puchito/Antilla MLP-609 (Cuba/US) | Split LP with tracks by Conjunto Chappottín and Melodías del 40 |
| 1974 | Mano a mano - Arsenio y Arcaño | Cariño DBMI 5800 (US) | Split LP with tracks by Arcaño y sus Maravillas |
| 1974 | El sentimiento de Arsenio | Cariño DBMI 5802 (US) | LP |
| 1974 | A todos los barrios | Cariño DBMI 5803 (US); Reissued on CD by BMG in 1992 | LP |
| 1988 | Homenaje a Arsenio Rodríguez | Areito LD-4496 (Cuba) | Split LP with tracks by Irakere, Chucho Valdés and Manguaré |
| 1990 | El sentimiento de Arsenio | RCA PCD-1402 (Japan) | CD |
| 1992 | Legendary Sessions | Tumbao Cuban Classics TCD-017 (Spain) | CD (with Chano Pozo and Machito) |
| 1992 | Cómo se goza en el barrio | Tumbao Cuban Classics TCD-022 (Spain) | CD |
| 1993 | Montuneando con Arsenio Rodríguez | Tumbao Cuban Classics TCD-031 (Spain) | CD |
| 1993 | Arsenio dice / La pachanga | P-Vine PCD-2707 (Japan) | CD |
| 1994 | Dundunbanza | Tumbao Cuban Classics TCD-043 (Spain) | CD |
| 1995 | Arsenio Rodríguez | Discmedi 206 (Spain) | CD |
| 1997 | Oye cómo dice... | Cubanacán CUCD 1703 (Colombia) | CD |
| 1997 | Soneros Vol. 2: La tradición de Cuba | Edenways EDE-1053 (France) | Split CD with tracks by Bimbi |
| 1999 | Arsenio Rodríguez y su Conjunto | Edenways EDE-2002 (France) | CD |
| 1999 | Tocoloro | Música Latina Nostalgia MLN 55006 (Belgium) | CD |
| 2000 | Fuego en el 23 | Better Music MSCD-7068 (Spain) | CD |
| 2002 | Mami me gustó | Better Music MSCD-7083 (Spain) | CD |
| 2004 | El rey del son montuno | Rice Records RRS-001 (UK) | CD |
| 2008 | El alma de Cuba | Tumbao Cuban Classics TCD-315 (Spain) | 6-CD boxset |
