= Deuda =

Deuda may refer to:

- Deuda (film), 2004
- Deuda (genre), song and dance genre from Nepal
- "Deuda" (bolero), 1945 song by Luis Marquetti, recorded by Arsenio Rodríguez and others
