= Bésame Morenita =

Colombian song

Song
- Released: 1950
- Songwriter: Álvaro Dalmar

"Bésame Morenita" (Kiss Me, My Dark-Haired Beauty) is a Colombian song. It was composed in 1950 by Álvaro Dalmar for the baritone Carlos Julio Ramirez. The song was censored in Spain in the mid-1950s for being "against public morality."

In its list of the 50 best Colombian songs of all time, El Tiempo, Colombia's most widely circulated newspaper, ranked the version of the song recorded by Nelson Pinedo with La Sonora Matancera at No. 26. Viva Music Colombia rated the song No. 47 on its list of the 100 most important Colombian songs of all time.

Bésame Morenita has been recorded by many artists including the following:

- Caloncho
- Pedro Fernández
- Víctor García
- Paquito Guzmán
- Pedro Infante
- La Sonora Matancera
- Nelson Pinedo
- Andy Russell
- Adán Calino Sánchez
- Aníbal Velásquez Hurtado
