= Enrique González "La Pulga" =

Enrique González
- Birth name: Enrique González Castillo
- Also known as: La Pulga
- Born: 1890; Santiago de Cuba, Cuba
- Died: January 1, 1957 (aged 66–67); Cuba
- Genres: Trova, bolero, canción, guaracha, guajira
- Occupation(s): Musician, songwriter
- Instrument(s): Guitar, voice

Enrique González Castillo (1890 – January 1, 1957), nicknamed La Pulga (The Flea), was a Cuban singer-songwriter from Santiago de Cuba. His two most famous works are the boleros "Injusta duda" and "Lupina", which have been recorded by artists such as Arsenio Rodríguez and Compay Segundo, respectively. The latter was written for danzonete singer Pablo Quevedo in 1934. His repertoire included boleros, canciones, guarachas and guajiras written by himself. The height of his career took place in the 1930s and '40s in Havana, where he was the guitarist for Benny Moré before he joined Conjunto Matamoros to tour Mexico. In addition, he was part of several other vocal groups, collaborating with famous guarachero Ñico Saquito.

In March 2014, Cuban trova musicians paid homage to González in his hometown of Santiago.

== Works ==
- "El que usted conoce no soy yo" (guaracha) - Recorded by Sonora Matancera feat. Rey Caney on October 8, 1958
- "Injusta duda" (bolero canción) - Recorded by Arsenio Rodríguez on January 22, 1952; Los Compadres on October 25, 1957; Los Guaracheros de Oriente ca. 1958, among others
- "Lupina" (bolero) - Originally recorded in 1934 by Pablo Quevedo with Cheo Belén Puig's orchestra (radio broadcast); later recorded by the same orchestra feat. Ñico Membiela in 1954; also recorded by Compay Segundo and others
- "Sublime indecisión" (bolero) - Recorded by Cheo Belén Puig's orchestra feat. Ñico Membiela in 1954
- "Mi tesorito" (bolero) - Recorded by Cheo Belén Puig's orchestra feat. Ñico Membiela in 1954
- "Una sola miradita" (bolero) - Recorded by Cheo Belén Puig's orchestra feat. Ñico Membiela in 1954
