= Chori =

Chori might refer to:

== People ==
- Silvano "Chori" Shueg (1900 – 1974), Cuban musician
- Alejandro Domínguez (footballer, born 1981), Argentine footballer
- Gonzalo Castro Irizábal (born 1984), known as Chory Castro, Uruguayan footballer

== Other ==
- Children's Hospital Oakland Research Institute, California
- Chori language, from Nigeria
- Chori people, a pejorative term referring to the Sirionó people from Bolivia
- Red chori, Indian beans
- Chorizo, a type of pork sausage
- Chori Chori (1956 film), 1956 Indian Hindi-language romantic musical film by Anant Thakur, starring Raj Kapoor and Nargis
- Chori Chori (2003 film), 2003 Indian Hindi-language film

== See also ==
- Chory, a given name and surname
