= Pedro Knight =

Cuban trumpeter (1921–2007)

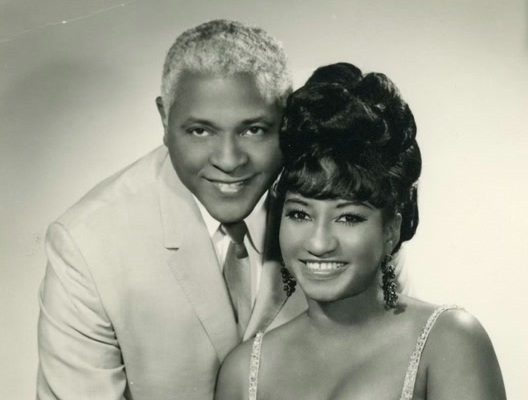
- Knight with his wife Celia Cruz, c. 1962

Background information
- Born: Gerónimo Pedro Knight Caraballo; September 30, 1921; Matanzas, Republic of Cuba
- Died: February 3, 2007 (aged 85) Los Angeles, California, U.S.
- Genres: Afro-Cuban conjunto
- Occupations: Trumpeter; manager
- Years active: c. 1942–2007
- Labels: Fania; RMM Records & Video; Sony Discos
- Formerly of: La Sonora Matancera
- Spouse: Celia Cruz (m. 1962; died 2003)

Gerónimo Pedro Knight Caraballo (September 30, 1921 – February 3, 2007) was a Cuban trumpeter, famously the husband and manager of singer Celia Cruz, married from 1962 until her death in 2003.

== Career ==
Pedro Knight Caraballo was born in Cuba, on Friday, September 30, 1921. He was a trained trumpeter, and a "powerfully expressive" musician, according to Sue Stewart of The Guardian. At age 23, he joined the Havana-based, Afro-Cuban conjunto band, La Sonora Matancera ("the sound of Matanzas", a port with a large black population), that produced, highly rhythmic dance music rooted in traditional, Africa-based styles of son and guaracha, as revived decades later by the Buena Vista Social Club. The key to the band's sound relied on trumpets, percussion, Cuban guitar, double bass, voices, and piano. At the time, Havana was emerging as one of the world's most popular musical nightspots. By the 1950s the band's sophisticated arrangements and live radio performances had become part of the golden age of Cuban music, having appeared alongside American singers such as Nat King Cole and Sarah Vaughan.

In 1950, the band's leader, Rogelio Martínez, invited Celia Cruz, who had gained popularity for her radio performances and for breaking the color barrier with the sexy song and dance act Las Mulatas de Fuego at the Tropicana, to join the band. Over the course of six or seven years, she and Knight gradually became good friends, though she resisted his romantic advances because she feared a relationship with Knight, whom she knew enjoyed casual relationships with women and had five children at that point, would not work out.

In July 1960, a year and a half after Fidel Castro came to power, La Sonora Matancera went to Mexico City to accept a two-year touring contract, but Martínez announced during a radio interview that he had no intention of returning to Cuba, a stance in which the rest of the band joined him. After 18 months, the band accepted a long-term contract at the Hollywood Palladium in Los Angeles, which entitled them to American residencies. By then, Cruz fell in love with Knight, and the couple moved to New York, where they married on July 14, 1962, after Knight abandoned his own music to become Cruz's manager, and the couple were inseparable. Commenting on their relationship, Cruz said, "Pedro is my 50%. I am the one that sings, but he takes care of everything else."

Knight (right) with Dexter Lehtinen, Celia Cruz, Alonso R. del Portillo and Ileana Ros-Lehtinen in May 1992

In 1963, after pressure from New York's salsa label, Fania, Knight agreed for Cruz to produce the album Celia y Johnny with musician/producer Johnny Pacheco, which began a lifelong friendship between the collaborators, and continued success for Cruz, including tours of six continents for the band in the 1970s and 1980s. By the mid-1990s, Cruz was an international star, and incorporated Knight into her performances, clasping him to her and referring to him as Mi cabecita de algodon (my little cottonhead) because of his halo of snow-white hair, and white mutton-chops. At home in Queens, New York, and later in Fort Lee, New Jersey, however, Cruz said she was a conventional Latina wife, performing errands such as cooking for him.

In early 2005, he attended the opening of an exhibition dedicated to Cruz at Washington's Smithsonian Museum. He worked on a biography and CD releases, but complications from years of diabetes began to take their toll on Knight, beginning with a mild stroke and then another more serious seizure in February 2006, the effects of which were exacerbated by family feuding over Cruz's fortune, though the lawsuits would be withdrawn due to Knight's dementia.

== Death ==
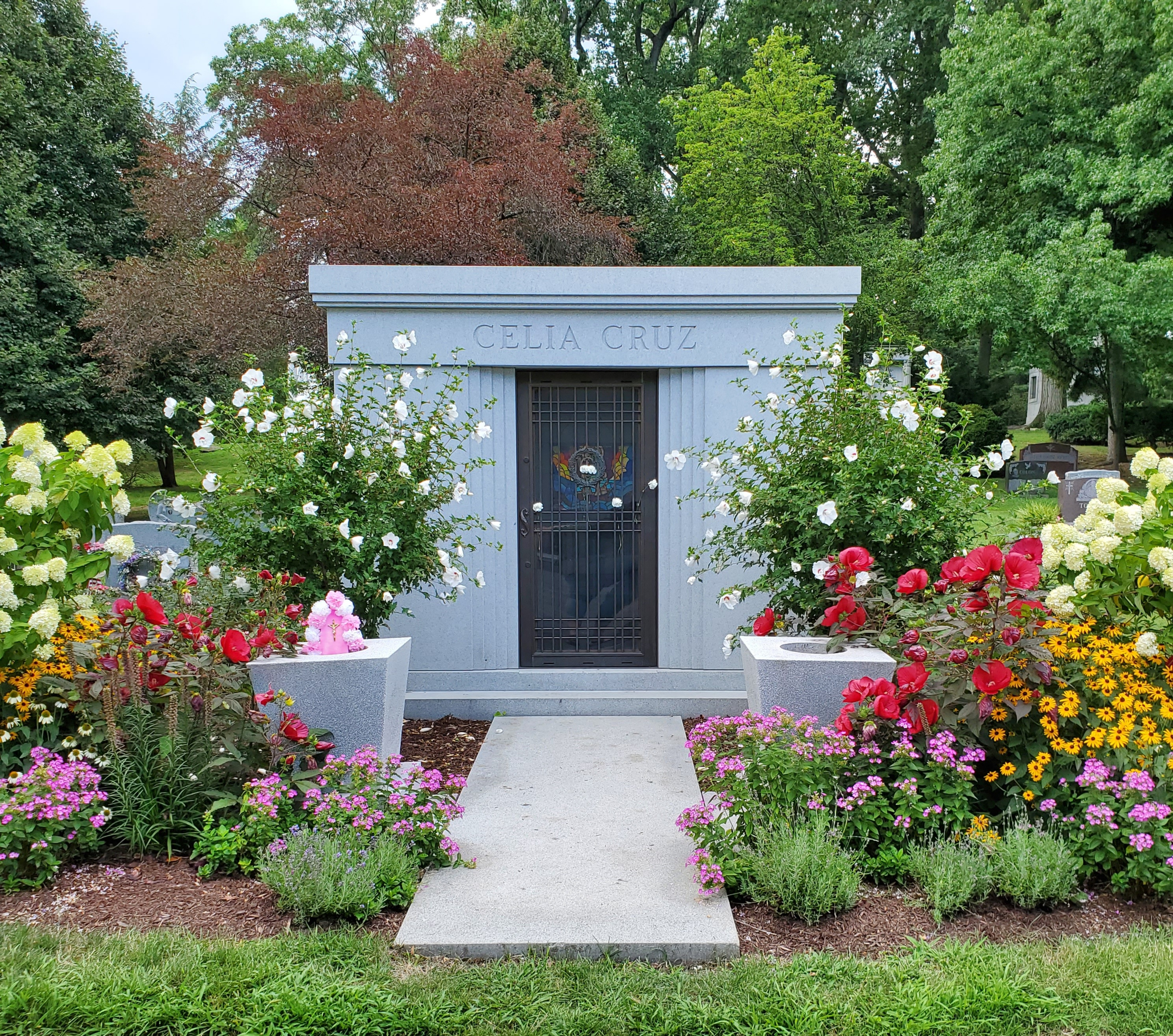
Knight and Cruz's mausoleum in Woodlawn Cemetery, Bronx, New York

Knight died on February 3, 2007, at age 85 of diabetes and other ailments. He was survived by their daughter, Ernestina Knight, and his other four children Emilia, Gladys, Pedro and Roberto, who remained in Cuba. He has been buried with Cruz in the mausoleum he built for them in 2003.
