= Calixto Leicea =

Cuban musician, arranger, and composer

Calixto Leicea (1909–2004) was a Cuban musician, arranger and composer. He was featured as a trumpeter of the Sonora Matancera.
