= Chory =

Chory is a surname and given name. Notable people with the name include:

- Chory Castro (born 1984), Uruguayan football player
- Joanne Chory (1955–2024), American plant biologist and geneticist
- Tomáš Chorý (born 1995), Czech football player

== See also ==
- Chori (disambiguation)
