= Luis Marquetti =

Cuban songwriter and composer (1901–1991)

- Birth name: Luis Marquetti Marquetti
- Born: August 24, 1901, Alquizar, Cuba
- Died: July 30, 1991 (aged 89); Alquizar, Cuba
- Genres: Bolero
- Occupation: Composer
- Years active: 1940s–1960s

Luis Marquetti (August 24, 1901 - July 30, 1991) was a Cuban songwriter and composer. He was born in the town of Alquízar.

Among his well-known boleros are Allí donde tú sabes and Deuda.

== Career ==
Born Luis Marquetti Marquetti, he was one of the great composers of the bolero, along such contemporaries as Orlando de la Rosa, Pedro Junco, René Touzet, Mario Fernández Porta, Isolina Carrillo, Osvaldo Farrés, Felo Bergaza, Adolfo Guzmán and Juan Bruno Tarraza.

Marquetti was the author of the hit song Deuda, popularized by a variety of musicians within and outside of Cuba.

He reached public notice through the voice of Pedro Vargas who contracted to record Deuda for RCA Víctor in New York.

Between 1946 and 1957 he had more than 30 of his works performed by over 100 artists. On the radio in Cuba his hits were performed by Sonora Matancera, Daniel Santos, Celia Cruz, Leo Marini, Bobby Capó, Celio González and Vicentico Valdés. In the 1950s, as recorded popular music gained an audience through the sale of 45 rpms, Marquetti's work spread throughout the island. In 1984 the recording firm Areíto (EGREM) put out a compilation of his previous recordings as Un Nuevo Corazón. His music was played on Cuban television, especially during the 1980s. His songs were used for film scores in Cuban and Mexican movies from the 1950s to the 1990s. His work also has appeared on the Cuban ballet.

In May 1952 Puerto Rican singer/composer Bobby Capó broke discriminatory policies imposed by CMQ, the most important network in the country at the time, which refused to promulgate Marquetti's work due to the color of his skin. When Capó included Marquetti's Deuda in recordings he was making in New York, a representative of the network brought up the problem, but Capó refused to exclude said bolero. The song was then included, but not officially listed. Further protest from Capó and others brought enough pressure to bear that Deuda was in the end properly included in the program.

In recent years Deuda has been recorded by Cheo Feliciano and, revising a version by Arsenio Rodriguez, was included in the Buena Vista Social Club album, sung by Ibrahim Ferrer.

== Catalog ==
- A ti, madrecita mía, 1941
- A ti que te pasa, 1956
- Allí donde tú sabes, 1948
- Alquízar, 1992
- Alma de azúcar, 1941
- Amor en Navidad, 1957
- Amor que malo eres, 1950
- Aquí entre nosotros, 1945
- Así te besaré, 1946
- Así no vengas, 1947
- Boletera, 1951
- Cada segundo te alejas más, 1992
- Caminito del abismo, 1954
- Cañaveral, 1950
- Con quien es, 1943
- Cualquiera se equivoca, 1950
- Cuba en mí, 1947
- Cuenta nueva, 1950
- De mis noches te reservo la mejor, 1992
- De ti la vida, 1943
- Debemos decidir, 1955
- Denúncieme señora, 1952
- Desastre, 1954
- Desde mi carreta, 1942
- Deuda, 1945
- El momento que vivimos, 1947
- En una frase, 1943
- Enséñame a deletrear, 1941
- Entre espumas, 1946
- Esta noche a las diez, 1943
- Este anochecer, 1966
- Este desengaño, 1947
- Fue realidad, 1949
- Hoy que la luna te regala su presencia, 1981
- Iba a suceder, 1947
- Iguales, 1946
- La quinta parte, 1947
- La verdad de mi canción, 1992
- Las Américas Unidas, 1941
- Las cosas de mi tierra, 1942
- Llegaste primavera, 1967
- Llevarás la marca, 1947
- Lo que eres tú, 1942
- Me robaste la vida, 1947
- Mi negrona, 1941
- Mírame de frente, 1956
- No es mucho, 1964
- No me avergüenza, 1954
- No me culpes, 1948
- No te vayas, 1941
- Nuestro problema, 1956
- Pacté con Dios, 1953
- Plazos Traicioneros, 1953
- Porfiado corazón, 1951
- Precaución, 1948
- Promesas de un campesino, 1946
- Rectifiquemos, 1955
- Robaré tu propio corazón, 1992
- Sabor de conga, 1941
- Si te lo digo, 1941
- Sigue tu canto, 1941
- Son de maíz, 1941
