= Bienvenido Granda =

Cuban vocalist and musician (1915–1983)

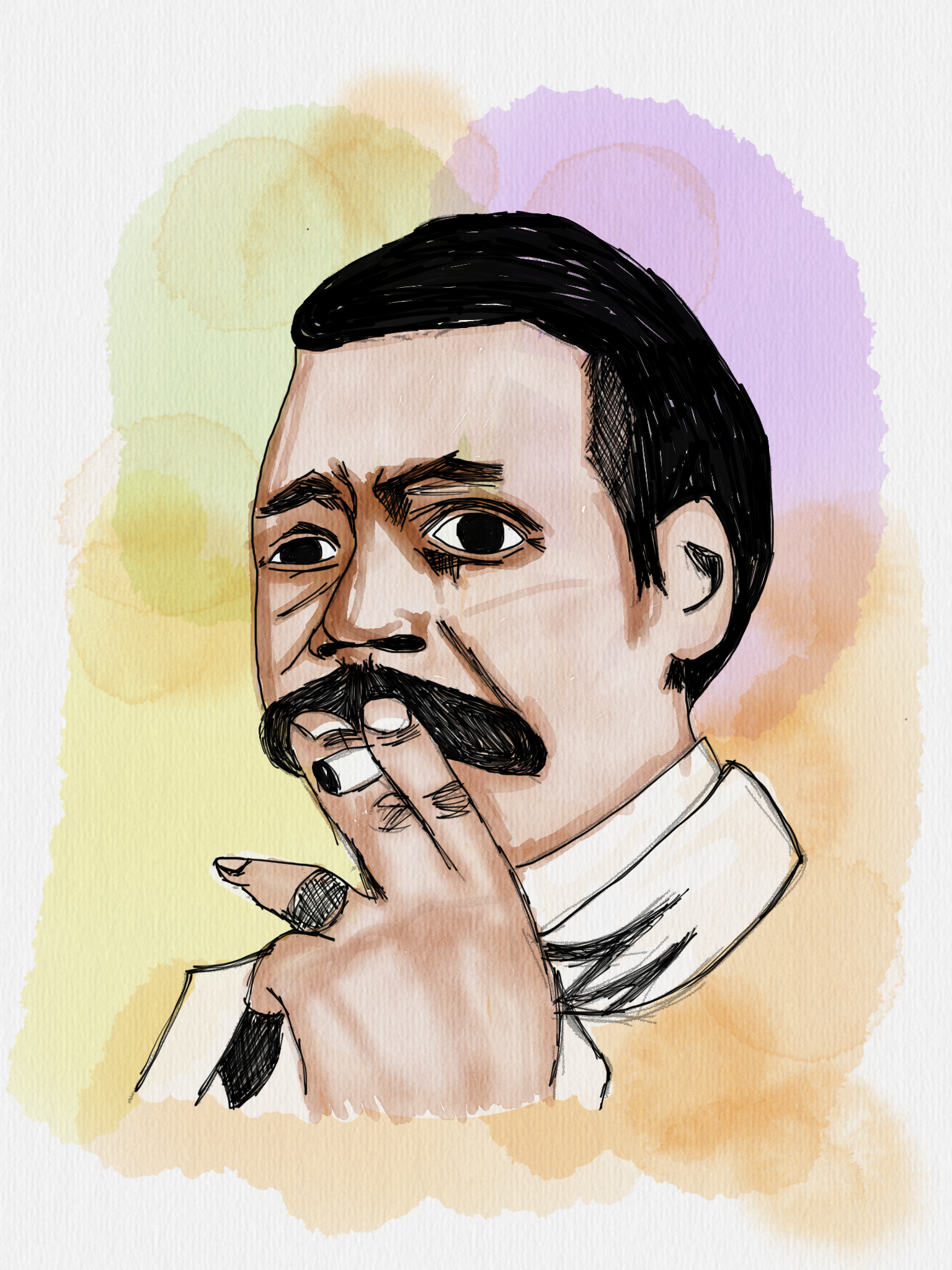

Background information
- Also known as: El bigote que canta
- Born: Rosendo Bienvenido Granda Aguilera; August 30, 1915; Havana, Cuba
- Died: July 9, 1983 (aged 67) Mexico City, Mexico
- Genres: Bolero, son montuno, guaracha
- Occupation: Musician
- Instrument: Singing
- Formerly of: Sonora Matancera

Bienvenido Granda, born Rosendo Bienvenido Granda Aguilera (Havana, August 30, 1915 – Mexico City, July 9, 1983), was a Cuban vocalist, songwriter and musician, singing boleros, son montunos, guarachas and other Cuban rhythms. He was best known for having been the lead singer of the Cuban ensemble Sonora Matancera in the 1940s and 50s. He had a distinctive voice, relaxing and sensual.

For sporting a unique mustache, he was nicknamed El bigote que canta (The mustache that sings) and El bigote que canta con estilo (The mustache that sings with style).

== Biography ==
Bienvenido Granda was orphaned at six years of age. He discovered his talent for singing various Cuban rhythms and tango as a child when he sang for spare change on buses in Cuba.

He traveled to Puerto Rico in 1941. The purpose of the trip was to record with the popular group Cuarteto Marcano. The songs recorded were “Dulce Desengaño” y “Desvarío."

Bienvenido Granda made several appearances on Cuban radio stations such as Radio Cadena Azul, Radio Cadena Suaritos, Radio Progreso and Radio CMQ. This was done as a way of gaining wider exposure.. In the 1930s-1940s, bolero and rumba experienced widespread listening in Brazil through the voices of artists such as Bienvenido Granda.

In 1942, Bienvenido Granda became the lead singer with one of the most popular bands of all Cuban/Afro-Cuban bands, the legendary Conjunto Sonora Matancera. He replaced the previous main singer and leader, Humberto Cané, in 1944 when the Cané left to pursue a solo career. The exact year that Bienvenido Granda became the lead singer of La Sonora Matancera, with some sources stating 1940 or 1942, while others claim 1944. Regardless of the exact year he joined, Bienvenido Granda performed, recorded and achieved his greatest success with La Sonora Matancera until 1954, the year in which he began his solo career, having left the group after a bitter argument with Rogelio Martínez, its director, over money. El bigote que canta wanted to be paid more than his fellow band members even though La Sonora was a cooperative. His legacy with the band is unmatched as no vocalist recorded more songs with La Sonora Matancera than Bienvenido Granda. He put on vinyl over 200 songs with this group.

After leaving Sonora Matancera Bienvenido Granda made recordings in New York and Colombia. In the sixties, he settled in Mexico City as a result of the Cuban Revolution. Later, Granda adopted the Mexican citizenship. In Mexico, he performed and recorded with many well known groups like the orchestra of Rafael de Paz, the Sonora Mexicana, the Cuarteto de Oro, the Sonora Veracruz, the orchestra of Salomón Jiménez, the Mariachi Oro y Plata, the Mariachi México, and celebrities like Armando Manzanero, Javier Solís, Lola Beltrán, Virginia López, and Fernando Fernández.

Bienvenido Granda sang several of the different musical genres created in Cuba, being especially proficient in the guaracha. He was also a fine bolero singer as the list above demonstrates.

He was 68 years old when he died on July 9 of 1983 in Mexico City from "gastrointestinal complications." His funeral was attended by many distinguished artists and thousands of fans who sang

Luna, ruégale que vuelva, y dile que la espero, muy solo y muy triste, en la orilla del mar.

a line from "En la Orilla del Mar," one of Granda's songs.

== Discography ==
- Romance Tropical
- 16 exitos con la Sonora Matancera
- Volume 14 of Big Leyendas de la música II
- Musical History
- Canta Sus Exitos

== Success ==
These songs, all recorded with the immortal Sonora Matancera, are among his greatest successes:

- La ola marina
- Echa pa'llá chico
- Vacilón: two slightly different versions
- Qué jelengue
- El cuento del sapo
- Machuquillo
- Pugilato
- Manteca
- Qué lengua más larga
- Lo que es la rumba
- Yo la mato
- Feliz viaje
- El ajiaco
- Esa sí es cheque
- Cuco-cheche-malo
- El bobo de la yuca
- Vive como yo
- Fiesta brava
- Se formó la bronca
- Tocando madera
- El velorio
- Ya se rompió el coco
- Tu precio
- Y del Vedado que
- Florecilla de amor
- Cinturita
- Ya se peinó María
- Oro falso
- Ya se rompió el muñeco
- Dejastes
- Tumba y quinto
- Pan de piquito
- Espérame un rato más
- Eso se hincha
- Sarará
- Hay que dejarse de cuento
- Calla
- No me eches la culpa
- Dónde están los rumberos
- Señora
- Angustia
- Qué dichoso es
- En la orilla del mar
- Pecastes de infiel
- Sujétate la lengua
