= Anabacoa =

Single by Beny Moré & Pérez Prado
- B-side: "Batiri RCA"
- Released: 1949
- Recorded: 1949
- Genre: Guaracha-mambo
- Length: 3:03
- Label: RCA Victor
- Songwriter: Juanchín Ramírez

Beny Moré & Pérez Prado singles chronology
"Qué te pasa José" (1949)	"Anabacoa" (1949)	"Mi chiquita" (1950)

"Anabacoa" is a guaracha composed by Puerto Rican trumpeter Juanchín Ramírez which has become a Latin music standard. Its most famous recording was made in Mexico in 1949 by Beny Moré backed by Pérez Prado and his orchestra. Recorded as a mambo, Moré's recording became a hit throughout Latin America. It was followed by the version made by Arsenio Rodríguez and his conjunto in 1950, which further cemented the piece as a standard of the Cuban music repertoire. Arsenio's rendition, although labeled as a guaracha, was driven by a guaguancó pattern on the tumbadora.

== Cover versions ==
In the 1970s, "Anabacoa" became the signature song of the Grupo Folklórico y Experimental Nuevayorkino, a New York-based descarga ensemble originally known as Conjunto Anabacoa. It was founded by Jerry González and his brother Andy in 1974. Like Arsenio's version, their rendition is also "a guaguancó based on a two-measure montuno pattern that is unchanging throughout the entire piece".

In the 1990s, Sierra Maestra recorded another descarga rendition of the song for their album Tíbiri tábara, which included other "familiar songs of the Cuban repertoire"

A new updated version has been recorded by the Bobby Sanabria Multiverse Big Band on the 2026 release, Arsenio And Beyond Live at the Bronx Music Hall. Anabaoca appears as part of medley segueing in after Arsenio Rodriguez's composition Yo Naci En Africa.
