= Celio González =

Cuban musician

Celio González (January 29, 1924 – 2004) was a Cuban musician. He was a notable singer from the Sonora Matancera.
