= Nelson Pinedo =

Napoleón Nelson Pinedo Fedullo (10 February 1928 – 27 October 2016) was a singer from Barranquilla, Colombia. In 1954, Pinedo began a five-year career with the Sonora Matancera, a Cuban ensemble, which at the time had widespread fame in Latin America. He incorporated various Colombian songs (porros, cumbias, and mapalés) into the band's repertoire— many of which were adapted to Cuban rhythms such as the Bolero.

== Death ==
Two weeks after suffering a stroke, Pinedo died in Valencia, Venezuela, on 27 October 2016 at the age of 88.

== Discography ==
- Una Noche en Caracas
- Nelson Pinedo Sings
- Sonora Matancera: Invite you to Dance
- Sonora Matancera: Desfile de Estrellas
- El Rítmico
- Cortijo Combo
- A Bailar Merecumbé Con Pacho Galán, con Pacho Galán y su Orquesta
- A Latin in América
- En Venezuela, con "Chucho" Sanoja y su Orquesta
- ¿Quién Será?
- La Esquina del Movimiento
- Sale Caliente...Y Como Callao...
