= Juanchín Ramírez =

Puerto Rican trumpeter, bandleader and composer

- Birth name: Juan Ramírez Rivera
- Born: April 22, 1906; San Juan, Puerto Rico
- Died: June 16, 1986 (aged 80); Río Piedras, Puerto Rico
- Genres: Guaracha, plena, mambo, son, chachachá
- Occupation(s): Musician, bandleader, songwriter
- Instrument(s): Trumpet, güiro
- Years active: 1914–1986
- Labels: Seeco

Juan Ramírez Rivera (April 22, 1906 – June 16, 1986), better known as Juanchín Ramírez, was a Puerto Rican trumpeter, bandleader and composer. He was a founding member of the Septeto Puerto Rico and the Grupo Aurora, as well as a member of the Noro Morales orchestra, also playing with Boro Milián, Rafael Hernández, Machito and others. He is best known for his popular compositions, primarily guarachas such as "Anabacoa", recorded by Beny Moré and Arsenio Rodríguez among others, and also "Plena española", made famous by Billo's Caracas Boys.

== Life and career ==
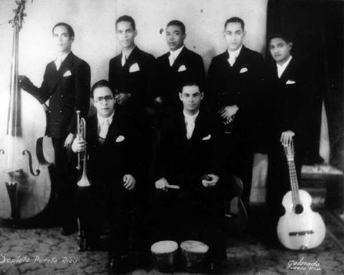
The Septeto Puerto Rico in the early 1930s. Ramírez is sitting, on the left.

Born in San Juan on April 22, 1906, son of Lino Ramírez, Spanish, and Marta Rivera, from Bayamón, Juanchín became interested in music from a young age. His uncle Paco played euphonium, while the Lumbano family (related to Ramírez through his mother's previous marriage) contained several percussionists. It was in fact with the Lumbanos that Ramírez began performing on the trumpet. He learned the instrument first by ear and then under the tutelage of Luis Morales, and later Juan Torres. As a boy, Ramírez had played güiro, but it was the trumpet that would eventually become his primary instrument. He spent much of his childhood living in Venezuela after his family moved there due to the bubonic plague outbreak of 1910.

Ramírez's first group was the Caribe Jazz Syncopator Group, directed by Dominican musician Petitón Guzmán, which he joined around 1927. He later joined cornetist Boro Milián's orchestra, first on güiro and later on trumpet. He then joined Los Hermanos Morales before becoming a founding member of the Sexteto Puerto Rico in 1933. The group was an expansion of Leocadio Vizcarrondo's Trío Puerto Rico, which became the first Cuban-style septeto in Puerto Rico after a residency in which they shared the bill with the Sexteto Matancero, directed by Graciano Gómez and Isaac Oviedo. After four years, Ramírez left the Septeto and was replaced by Miguelito Miranda, in order to join Orquesta Modelo, while also playing with Rafael Hernández's group, and shortly afterwards the Orquesta Carmelo Díaz Soler. Ramírez was also a member in the early 1930s of the Grupo Aurora, which featured famed cuatro player Ladislao Martínez, guitarist Moncho Dávila and harmony vocalist Don Felo. This was the first group to record a guaracha in Puerto Rico, doing so in 1932.

Around 1944, Ramírez emigrated to New York, where he joined Los Segundo Afro Cubanos de Varona. While playing with Varona, he was heard by Noro Morales, who hired him for his band. He spent many years with Morales, also playing with Machito in New York, before settling back in Puerto Rico, where he established new groups such as the Cuarteto Modelo and Los Pleneros del Palmar. With the latter, he recorded an album for Seeco in 1960, Así es la plena, which comprises twelve plenas. The Pleneros were founded as the house band of TV channel WIPR-TV, and often featured Rafael Cepeda as lead singer, although the main vocalist was Tasso Peña.

Ramírez died in Río Piedras, San Juan, on June 16, 1986. At the time of his death, he was a member of the Banda del Instituto de Cultura.
