= Silvano "Chori" Shueg =

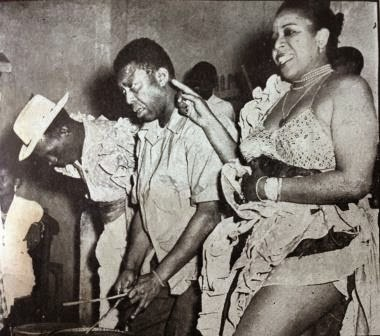
- Chori playing timbales, 1950.

Background information
- Also known as: Choricera
- Born: Silvano Shueg Hechevarría; January 6, 1900; Santiago de Cuba, Cuba
- Died: April 1974 (aged 74) Havana, Cuba
- Genres: Son cubano, guaracha
- Occupation: Musician
- Instruments: Timbales, drums, cowbell, bottles, pans, boxes

Silvano Shueg Hechevarría (January 6, 1900 – April 1974), better known as Chori or Choricera, was a famous Cuban percussionist. He rose to prominence in the 1930s due to his extravagant shows at many nightclubs in Havana where he played timbales, drums, cowbells and objects such as bottles and metal pans. He composed the popular sones "La choricera" and "Ayaca de maíz", and appeared in several films in the 1950s.

== Life and career ==
=== Early years ===
Silvano Shueg Hechevarría was born on January 6, 1900, in Santiago de Cuba, the capital of Oriente, Cuba's easternmost region. In 1919 Shueg became the timbalero in a son estudiantina (student ensemble) from Santiago called Los Champions del Son. In 1927, the band toured Havana and Shueg decided to stay in the city, where he joined the Marte y Belona dance academy. He then began performing at the numerous nightclubs and cabarets along the beach in Marianao, such as Los Tres Hermanos, El Ranchito, Rumba Palace (which was renamed La Choricera in his honor), and La Taberna de Pedro, where he played for over a decade. In these venues he met other percussionists including Cándido Camero and Tito Puente. He played sones and guarachas, and occasionally sang through a megaphone.

=== Rise to fame ===
Shueg quickly became a popular act in Havana's nightlife, partially as result of his self-promotion through graffiti that he sketched on streets and trains. In addition, American journalist Drew Pearson contributed to Shueg's popularity by mentioning him in his column. He composed two sones, "La choricera" and "Ayaca de maíz", that became very popular. Miguelito Valdés invited him to play at the Sans Souci, but the Musicians's Guild rejected him and Shueg went back to the nightclubs on the shoreline. In 1955 he took part in the Mexican film Un extraño en la escalera, and in 1956 Marlon Brando went to see him during his visit to Havana, ultimately failing to bring Shueg to the United States (Shueg left the airport minutes before his flight). Two years later, Errol Flynn attended one of Shueg's performances and offered him a role in the film The Big Boodle, which he accepted. Many other celebrities attended his performances in Havana between the 1930s and 1950s, including Langston Hughes, Toña la Negra, Agustín Lara, Cab Calloway, and Ernest Hemingway, and he was featured in Life magazine.

=== Later years and death ===
In 1961, Shueg appeared in the cinéma vérité short film PM, the first film to be banned in Castro's regime. Starting in 1962, Shueg would often perform at a peña (a venue) where veteran musicians and trovadores such as Sindo Garay would play. These concerts were organized by Alfredo González Suazo, better known as Sirique, who named the band Los Tutankamén. In 1966, Shueg and the rest of the group appeared in the documentary La herrería de Sirique.

Shueg died in April 1974 in Havana. In 2001, Cuban poet Ramón Fernández-Larrea wrote a piece in Shueg's memory.

== Filmography ==
- 1955: Un extraño en la escalera
- 1958: The Big Boodle
- 1961: PM (Pasado Meridiano)
- 1966: La herrería de Sirique
