= Sonora Matancera =

Cuban band

Sonora
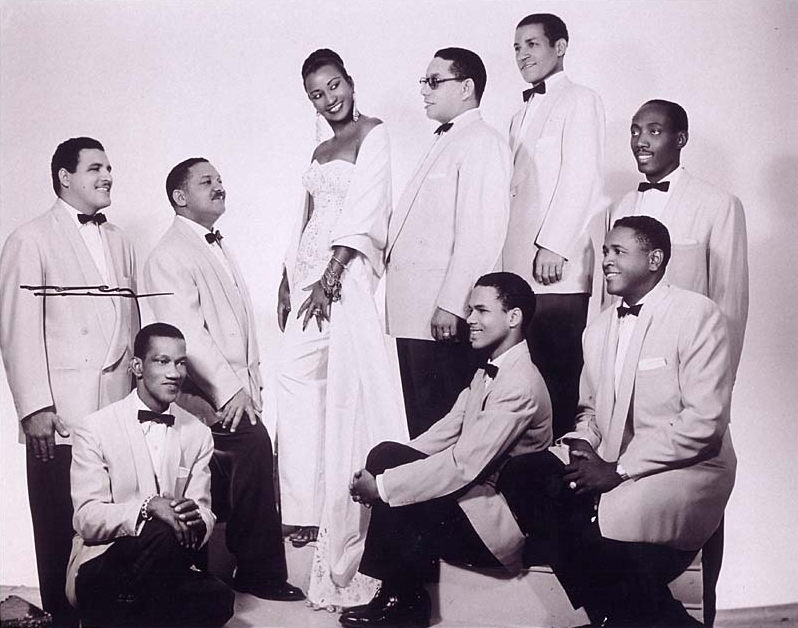
- Celia Cruz and La Sonora Matancera, 1950s

Background information
- Also known as: Tuna Liberal; Septeto Soprano; Estudiantina Sonora Matancera; Conjunto Sonora Matancera
- Origin: Barrio Ojo de Agua, Matanzas, Cuba
- Genres: Son, guaracha, bolero, guaguancó, chachachá
- Years active: 1924–present
- Labels: RCA Victor, Panart, Stinson, Ansonia, Seeco, Tropical, Marvela, MRVA, Orfeón, Bárbaro, Fania, Taurus, Warner Music, Varsity, Discos Fuentes
- Members: Valentín Cané; Pablo Vázquez Gobín "Bubú"; Manuel Sánchez "Jimagua"; Ismael Goberna; Domingo Medina; José Manuel Valera; Juan Bautista Llopis; Julio Gobín; Humberto Cané; Carlos Manuel Díaz Alonso "Caíto"; Rogelio Martínez Díaz; José Rosario Chávez "Manteca"; Calixto Leicea; Pérez Prado; Bienvenido Granda; Ezequiel Frías Gómez "Lino"; Ángel Alfonso Furias "Yiyo"
- Past members: Bienvenido León; Daniel Santos; Myrta Silva; Celia Cruz; Pedro Knight; Miguelito Valdés; Leo Marini; Bobby Capó; Nelson Pinedo; Vicentico Valdés; Estanislao Sureda "Laíto"; Roberto Torres; Alberto Beltrán; Carlos Argentino; Celio González; Elpidio Vázquez; Carmen Delia Dipiní; Javier Vázquez; Willy Rodríguez "El Baby"; Alfredo Armenteros "Chocolate"; Ismael Miranda; Justo Betancourt; Linda Leida; Gabriel Eladio Peguero "Yayo El Indio"; Welfo Gutiérrez; Olga Chorens; Gloria Díaz; Tony Álvarez; Chito Galindo; Toña la Negra; Elliot Romero; Emilio Domínguez "El Jarocho"; Gladys Julio; Hermanas Lago; Israel del Pino; Johnny López; Jorge Maldonado; Kary Infante; Manuel Licea "Puntillita"; Martha Jean Claude; Máximo Barrientos; Miguel de Gonzalo; Pepe Reyes; Raúl del Castillo; Reinaldo Hierrezuelo "Rey Caney"; Rodolfo Hoyos; Tony Díaz; Victor Piñero; Vicky Jiménez; Alfredo Valdés; Roberto Torres
- Website: sonoramatancera.com

La Sonora Matancera is a Cuban band that played Latin American urban popular dance music. Founded in 1924 and led for more than five decades by guitarist, vocalist, composer, and producer Rogelio Martínez, musicologists consider it an icon of this type of music. Notable singers to have sung and recorded with the band include Bienvenido Granda, Daniel Santos, Myrta Silva, Miguelito Valdés, Leo Marini, Celia Cruz, Nelson Pinedo, Vicentico Valdés, Estanislao "Laíto" Sureda, Alberto Beltrán, Carlos Argentino, and Celio González.

== Early history: 1920s to 1940s ==
=== The founding of Tuna Liberal ===
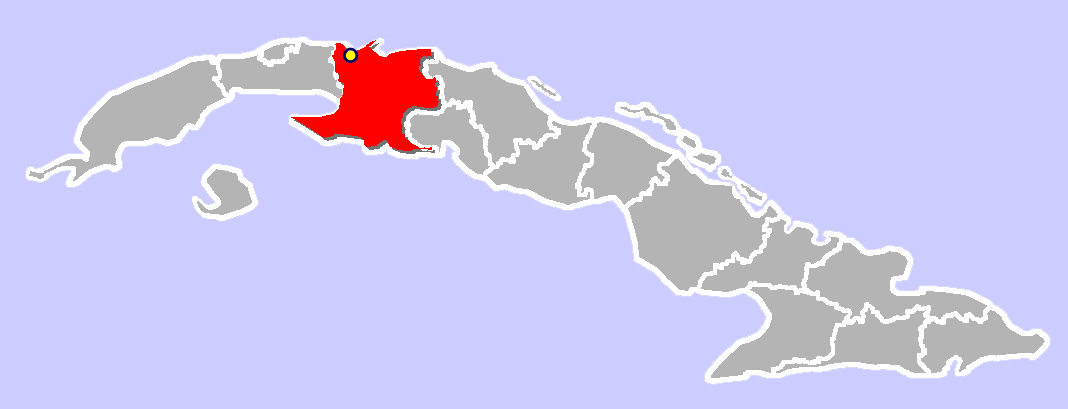
Matanzas, Cuba

The group was founded on January 12, 1924 in Barrio Ojo de Agua, a neighborhood in the city of Matanzas. Culturally and demographically, this seaport is located in the most African region of Cuba. The ensemble was initially named Tuna Liberal for political reasons. The co-founders were Valentín Cané (director, tres, guitar and tumbadora, or as it is commonly called, conga. He was also a songwriter and later on a singer) and Pablo "Bubú" Vázquez Gobín (contrabass). The other original members were Manuel "Jimagua" Sánchez (timbales), Ismael Goberna (cornet/trumpet), Domingo Medina, José Manuel Valera, Julio Gobín, Juan Bautista Llopis (guitarists), and Eugenio Pérez, vocalist. One source believes Valera and Bautista Llopis were the vocalists while a second source holds to the position that Eugenio Pérez was the sole sonero. At this point, the band was just a commonplace group and had not yet developed its distinctive sound.

=== The 1920s ===
In 1925, Gerardo Machado, then Cuban President, invited Tuna Liberal to play at a party for his birthday. This marked a new acceptance for Afro-Cuban groups and a style of music that had previously been barred from certain restaurants and hotels.

Personnel changed in 1926, and the name of the band was changed to Septeto Soprano, due to supposed new singer Eugenio Pérez (according to one source), though he left a few months later. A different source credits the new name to the vocal range of the singer and maracas player, Carlos Manuel "Caíto" Díaz Alonso, who became a member the same year.

Rogelio Martínez joined the group in 1926, after Caíto recommended him to Valentín Cané. Another source indicates that Rogelio recommended Caíto to Valentín Cané, and that Caíto and Rogelio became members in 1927. A third source posits that Caíto and Rogelio joined the collective in 1926; both had recorded with pianist and bandleader Antonio María Romeu.

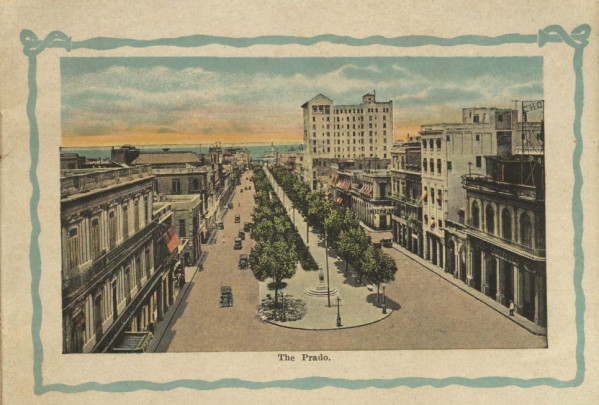
Havana in the 1920s

The group lost Domingo Medina, Julio Gobín, and Juan Bautista Llopis in their attempt at a more modern sound. In 1927, at the suggestion of Valentín Cané, the ensemble moved to Havana, intending to stay one week. It remained there for the next thirty-three years.

Havana was home to a thriving music scene in the 1920s. Septeto Soprano played their first engagements in La Habana at such popular nocturnal haunts as El Teatro Alhambra, El Centro Gallego, El Centro Asturiano, La Casa de los Médicos, El Club de los 20, El Club de los Anaranjados and other dance clubs. The group alternated at these nightspots with other ensembles of the day, including the likes of Sexteto Habanero, Sexteto Munamar, Sexteto Boloña, Septeto Nacional de Ignacio Piñeiro (one source asserts that this ensemble was a sexteto, not a septeto, at this time), Sexteto Pinareño, and Sexteto Gloria Cubana. At first the collective did not have an easy time due to the professionalism of the other tríos, cuartetos, sextetos, and septetos active at this time, but carved out a niche for itself in the Cuban capital.

The move to Havana proved to be consequential. In 1928, the collective made its first recordings, for its first label, RCA-Victor. The ensemble would eventually record for thirteen different labels.

In 1929, the band signed a contract to perform live on the airwaves of Radio Progreso, making appearances on this station for many years.

=== The 1930s ===
Son ensembles of this time added pianos to broaden their contrapuntal and harmonic vocabulary. Trumpets, sometimes as many as three, replaced cornets. The additional instruments meant sextetos and septetos evolved into conjuntos. Septeto Soprano added a piano during this decade but did not expand its brass section until the 1940s.

Septeto Soprano made only one recording during this decade. It was for RCA-Victor.

Some of the individuals important to the group's success began their long association with the collective in the 1930s. In 1932, Rogelio Martínez was appointed co-director. He was influential in determining the destiny of the conjunto. Juan Bautista Llopis returned for a brief period, and a new percussionist, José "Manteca" Rosario Chávez, became a member. Three more sources say that Manteca joined in 1929 while one other source states that this happened in 1935. Manteca filled the vacancy created when Jimagua left.

The collective changed its name to Estudiantina Sonora Matancera in the early 1930s. Each change in the group's name was indicative of a change in instrumentation and its corresponding stylistic change.

In 1935, vocalist Manolo Barquín occasionally sang with the group. That year it adopted its formal name, Conjunto Sonora Matancera. Calixto Leicea and Humberto Cané (son of Valentín Cané) became members in this year. Another source claims Humberto Cané joined in 1929.

Calixto Leicea replaced Ismael Goberna, who retired because of poor health and died a few months later. By then, Calixto had played and made his name with Sexteto Nacional (led by Ignacio Piñeiro), Chaveo y Su Grupo, Juventud Habanera, Sexteto Guarina, and María Teresa Vera. As was common with musicians of his generation throughout Latin America, he had been a member of a government-sponsored municipal band, La Banda Municipal de Matanzas (prior to embarking on a career as a professional musician), getting a firm musical education in the process. Calixto Leicea was an excellent songwriter and arranger. The band recorded many of his compositions as well as arrangements. The collective's theme song "Traigo un tono" is a guaracha composed in 1947 by Calixto.

Humberto Cané succeeded his father on tres and, as well, sang. Valentín Cané, having ceded to his eldest son the tres chair, remained a valuable member of the collective, as he still sang, composed and — in a new role — played tumbadora. The departure of Humberto Cané in 1944 signaled the end of the tres as part of the permanent instrumentation of the group.

Dámaso Pérez Prado (later, in the 1950s, famous as El Rey del Mambo) was the band's first pianist and one of its earliest arrangers from 1936 to 1939. Severino "Refresquito" Ramos was the primary arranger, as well as pianist, from 1939 (but especially since 1942) to 1944 and, as such, principal architect of the sonic identity of this conjunto. After 1944, he limited himself to arranging and composing.

In this decade, La Sonora Matancera faced strong competition from such ensembles as Sexteto Guarina, Juventud Habanera de Joseíto Fernández, Sexteto Nacional de Ignacio Piñeiro, Sexteto Segundo Nacional, Trío Matamoros, Sexteto Casino (it would later become a conjunto), Sexteto María Teresa Vera, Conjunto Kubavana, Belisario López, and Orquesta Antonio María Romeu. There was a rivalry between Sexteto Nacional de Ignacio Piñeiro and Sonora Matancera.

The ensemble terminated its association with Radio Progreso by the end of the decade. In 1939, it was signed to a contract by the ownership/management of Radio CMQ (or simply CMQ) for a series of live broadcasts.

=== The 1940s ===
Bienvenido Granda sang lead vocals from 1940 to 1954, the first truly important sonero to perform and record with the conjunto. Another source says that he joined La Sonora Matancera in 1942 while a third source says it was in 1944. Whatever the case may be, his association with Sonora Matancera made it famous throughout the Spanish-speaking Caribbean. No one recorded more tunes with the ensemble than Bienvenido Granda, as he made over 200 recordings during his time with the ensemble.

In 1942, La Sonora Matancera left CMQ. It would now broadcast — with Bienvenido Granda as lead singer — over the airwaves of RHC Radio.

Pedro Knight and Ezequiel "Lino" Frías Gómez left Arsenio Rodríguez's conjunto to join Sonora Matancera on the same day in 1944. These two steered the collective towards a more modern sound. The one gave the brass section more heft while the other enhanced the rhythm section. Pianist Lino Frías anchored La Sonora's rhythm section until 1976. He was also a superb composer and arranger.

In 1944, the conjunto made its next-to-last recordings for RCA-Victor. It also was signed to a recording contract by the newly established Panart Records.

Original director Valentín Cané led the group till an asthmatic condition forced him to retire in 1946. He continued to receive pay as if he were an active member of La Sonora Matancera till he died two years later. In 1946, in place of Valentín Cané, Tata Güines, who was a member of the groundbreaking ensemble led by Israel "Cachao" López in the late 1950s and the early 1960s, became the conguero for a short time. Carlos "Patato" Valdés also held this position for a few months.

Ángel "Yiyo" Alfonso Furias took over the tumbadora chair in 1948 and thus completed the quintessential lineup. From 1948 to 1954, it consisted of:

- Calixto Leicea: first trumpet chair;
- Pedro Knight: second trumpet chair;
- Pablo "Bubú" Vázquez Gobín: contrabass;
- Ezequiel "Lino" Frías Gómez: piano;
- José "Manteca" Rosario Chávez: timbalitos, bongó and cencerro (also known as campana);
- Ángel "Yiyo" Alfonso Furias: tumbadora;
- Rogelio Martínez: Director, guitar and coro (background vocals);
- Carlos Manuel "Caíto" Díaz Alonso: maracas and coro;
- Bienvenido Granda: lead vocals, coro (whether he or some other sonero sang lead with the band) and claves.

Sonora Matancera honed its skills over a generation — from the late 1920s to the late 1940s — in the academias de baile (a special type of dance hall), such as the famous Marte y Belona, where nightly La Sonora drew record crowds of the best dancers. Apart from this prestigious academia, other nightspots where La Sonora Matancera entertained the dancing public in the early 1940s were El Habana Sport, another academia de baile, Centro Castellano, La Tropical (one source lists a dance hall called La Cervecería Tropical; it is not at all clear if these two are one and the same) and Las Playitas. The collective during this time also made live broadcasts on Radio Progreso. Later that same decade Sonora Matancera frequently played in such top dance venues as El Club Atlético Santiago de Las Vegas, Quibikán, Centro Gallego, El Edén Concert, Sans Souci, El Tropicana and Centro Asturiano. At this time La Sonora always performed on the feast day of August 15, known as La Tutelar, at El Liceo Guanabacoa while Arsenio Rodríguez y Su Conjunto Orquestal Todos Estrellas and Antonio Arcaño y sus Maravillas (Cachao and his brother Orestes López were members of this orchestra at the time) engaged in a musical mano a mano on the same day at El Manantial de la Cotorra. Its long tenure in the academias served La Sonora Matancera well as it transformed the ensemble into an excellent dance band.

In the 1940s, the conjunto more than held its own against such important groups as Orquesta Casino de La Playa, Arsenio Rodríguez, Orquesta Ideal, Cheo Belén Puig, Antonio Arcaño y sus Maravillas, Conjunto Jóvenes del Cayo, and Orquesta Almendra. Together with this cooperative these bands made Cuba "El Paraíso Musical de las Américas" ("The Musical Paradise of the Americas").

From the mid-1940s till the end of the 1950s, the collective had a program as "artistas exclusivos" ("exclusive artists") on Radio CMQ called "Cascabeles Candado".

In the period 1947–1948, the group made a number of recordings (Bienvenido Granda as lead singer on the majority of these numbers) as Conjunto Tropicavana or Conjunto Tropicabana. The name change was to avoid legal problems, since the band was still under contract to Panart Records.

As this decade drew to a close, Sonora Matancera decided on a course of action that would become standard practice: the incorporation of non-Cuban lead singers into its ranks (without excluding the use of Cuban artists). The first non-Cuban singers were Puerto Ricans, singer/composer Daniel Santos and guarachera/songwriter Myrta Silva. Some of these vocalists were featured lead singers. Others were invited to record a limited number of songs during a brief period of time.

Daniel Santos performed and recorded with the collective beginning in 1948. His five-year stay with La Sonora helped it achieve world-wide fame. The cooperative returned to airing live broadcasts at Radio Progreso in 1948 with Daniel Santos as the featured lead vocalist.

Myrta Silva was the first woman to join the musical collective. Over a short time in 1949, she recorded four studio sessions with the conjunto. She left by 1950. Myrta returned in 1952 and made a number of live recordings.

In 1949, the ensemble recorded twenty-two songs for Ansonia Records. The conjunto made said recordings using its real name. That same year, moreover, it signed with Seeco Records, which was owned by New York City-based Sidney Siegel. The first recording for this label was made on November 25, 1949, the guaracha "Tocando madera", with Bienvenido Granda as sonero. The association with Seeco Records lasted until 1966, with the last recordings having been made in the prior year. The source does not indicate if the group was still contractually obligated to Panart Records when it recorded for Ansonia and when it signed, as well as recorded, with Seeco.

== Late 1940s to late 1950s ==
La Sonora Matancera's most successful period was from 1947 until 1959. This was its golden age. By the early 1950s, the ensemble made live broadcasts from the studios of Radio Progreso, Radio CMBG, and Radio CMQ. These stations broadcast on shortwave radio, which helped increase the collective's popularity in Latin America. During this decade, the band — besides these regular bookings on Cuban radio — had its calendar filled with club dates, film appearances, and tours overseas. The majority of its recordings were made at this time.

=== Temporary change to Big Band style ===
Besides personnel and instrumental changes, Sonora Matancera, as already illustrated, underwent stylistic changes. In 1950, the conjunto expanded to big band (orquesta) size, making a series of recordings with Daniel Santos. Though these met with approval, the orquesta reverted to a conjunto.

About 1950, the ensemble recorded eighty tunes for Stinson Records using the name of Sonora Cubana. It already had recorded ten numbers under this name and would record two additional songs as Sonora Cubana; the record company for these twelve tunes is not named by the source. The lead vocalist on these recordings is Bienvenido Granda.

=== Addition of Celia Cruz, personnel changes and the first overseas tour ===
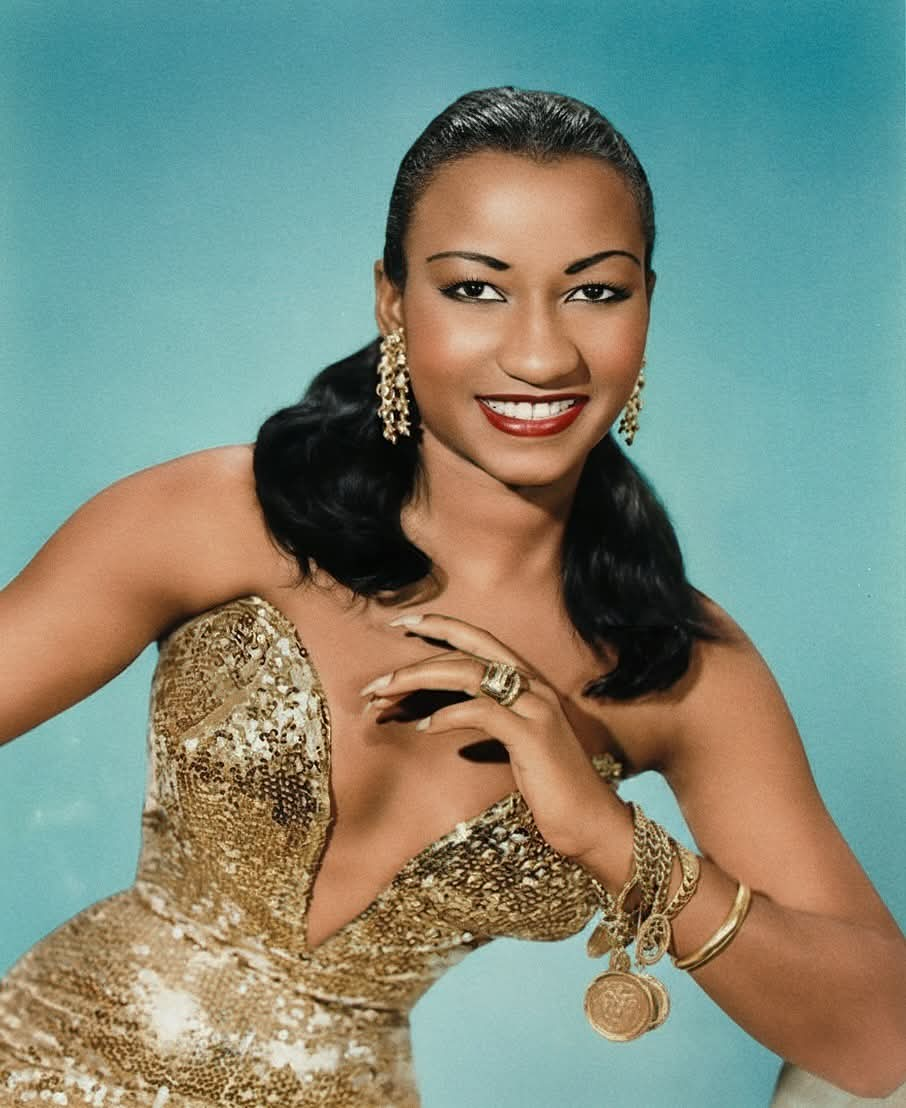
Celia Cruz in 1957

Celia Cruz succeeded Myrta Silva in 1950, performing and recording with the conjunto until 1965. Fans of the cooperative at first did not accept Celia as a worthy replacement for Myrta, but by 1951 she had won the audience over. In 1962, she married second trumpeter Pedro Knight, who later became her "protector, manager, and musical director".

Cruz's first recording with the conjunto was made on December 15, 1950. It was for Seeco Records. "Cao cao, maní picao" was an instant success, a "bombshell". Seeco had an extensive distribution network, allowing it to ship its recordings of different artists, including La Sonora, throughout Latin America.

Personnel changes in 1954 included the replacement by Estanislao "Laíto" Sureda of Bienvenido Granda as male lead singer; Bienvenido left after a heated argument with Rogelio Martínez over money: he wanted higher pay than his colleagues, but in the collective all received the same salary. One other personnel change occurred this year. Elpidio Vázquez, a son of Bubú, replaced him on contrabass.

The conjunto made its first overseas tour in 1955. It performed in Panama, Colombia, Venezuela and Costa Rica. In the course of the Colombia tour, Carlos Argentino joined the band as a singer and remained till 1959.

Manteca left either in 1955 or in 1957, retiring as had other members through the years because of health matters. Simón Domingo "Minino" Esquijarroza then became the percussionist.

In 1956, Celio González replaced Laíto on lead vocals (besides singing coro with Rogelio, Caíto, and Laíto and playing the güiro); he stayed until 1959. Refresquito retired in 1957, and Javier Vázquez, another son of Bubú, then became the principal arranger. In 1959, the conjunto undertook another overseas tour, playing in Venezuela, Peru, Chile, and Uruguay; the year is considered the ensemble's high-water mark.

== The Middle Period: 1960s to 1970s ==
=== Leaving Cuba and its aftermath: 1960–1961 ===
The cooperative began the decade with a tour of Haiti, the Dominican Republic, Aruba, and Curaçao, but the political upheaval following the Cuban Revolution affected the group greatly. Having signed a lucrative contract to perform in Mexico City, the group, accompanied by Celia Cruz, left Havana on June 15, 1960. Minino decided to stay; the conjunto never returned to Cuba.

On July 15, 1960 two new singers joined the group, Willy "El Baby" Rodríguez and Alberto Pérez Sierra. Of the eleven new vocalists associated with La Sonora Matancera in the 1960s, only two remained for any appreciable amount of time, Willy "El Baby" Rodríguez and Justo "El Mulato" Betancourt. In 1961, Mario "Papaíto" Muñoz joined the ensemble as the new timbalero/bongosero/campanero. Additionally, Celio González returned and continued as sonero and güiro player until 1965.

=== 1962–1965 ===
In 1962, Sonora Matancera established itself in New York City, where it continued to perform Cuban/Afro-Cuban urban popular dance music. Its residency in New York would last for thirty-nine years, longer than their stay in Havana.

In 1965, Celia, Celio and Willy all ended their affiliation with the collective. Celia Cruz went on to become a significant and celebrated performer of so-called salsa music, and was known as the "Queen of Salsa".

In that same year, Caíto and Lino were among the vocalists and instrumentalists gathered by Dominican-born Johnny Pacheco for a classic studio recording. Besides Caíto and Lino two other musicians associated with La Sonora played on this album. One was from the past (Patato) and one was a trumpeter who would be invited to participate in a 1981 recording session (Pedro "Puchi" Boulong).

=== A Time of Transition: 1966–1969 ===
Pedro Knight retired as a trumpeter in 1967 to be Celia Cruz's full-time manager. Ramón Emilio "Chiripa" Aracena became the new second trumpet chair that same year.

Leo Marini, a vocal mainstay during the 1950s, renewed his association by recording an album with the cooperative in 1969.

The latter half of the decade saw the emergence of two new musical genres, the Boogaloo and the closely related shing-a-ling. These musical styles were born in New York City of the admixture of Latin — specifically Cuban/Afro-Cuban rhythms — and rhythm and blues in its incarnation as soul music. Many New York-based groups recorded in this style to satisfy their record companies. La Sonora Matancera also recorded an album, Sonora Boogaloo, even though they were recording at this time for their own label. Soon after Sonora Matancera returned to their earlier style.

At the end of the 1960s six of the nine members of La Sonora were stalwarts of the glory years.

=== 1970s ===
Over the course of this decade, soneros and instrumentalists came and went. Instrumentational and stylistic changes were the order of the day as well.

During this time, La Sonora Matancera continued to record, perform at dance clubs, and tour overseas. Early in the 1970s, the ensemble played at Carnegie Hall. Eventually, it would travel to Europe, playing in Spain, France, Germany, and Finland.

In 1970, Justo Betancourt left, to be replaced by Gabriel Eladio "Yayo el Indio" Peguero. This was a significant change in lead singers, for Yayo remained with Sonora Matancera for more than two decades. He recorded only forty-four songs. This does not negate the fact that Yayo was the most important sonero to perform and record with the cooperative in its later years.

In 1971, Chiripa left the ensemble. Saúl Torres entered in his stead. Carlos Argentino, a veteran of the golden age, rejoined and recorded with La Sonora in the same year. In 1972, Leo Marini returned to the collective (without evidence of recording that year).

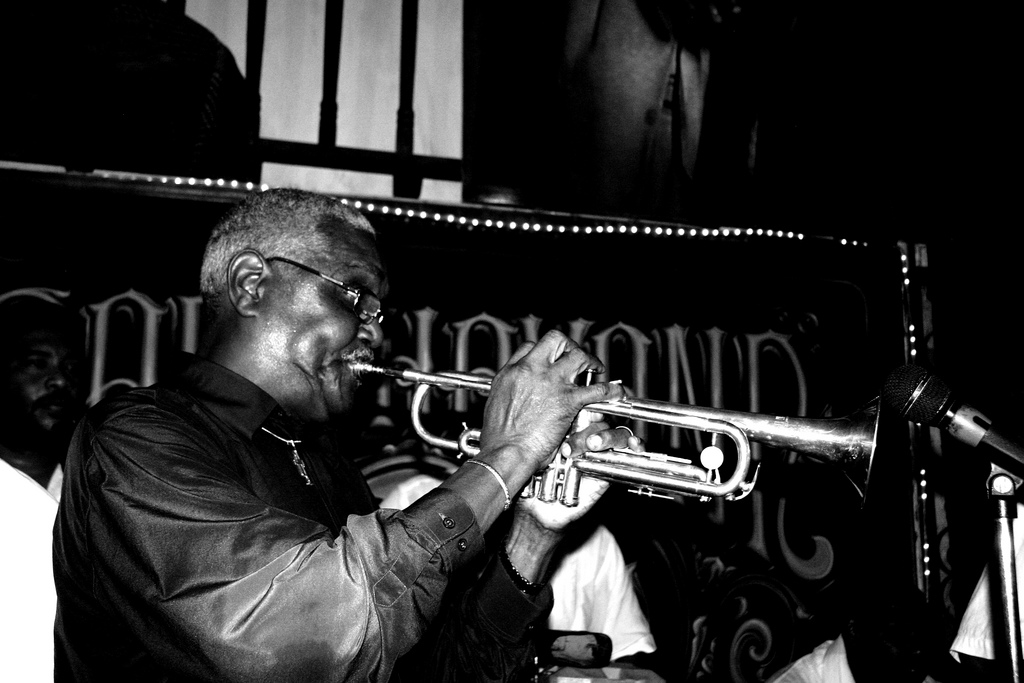
"Chocolate" Armenteros on trumpet.

Between 1973 and 1977, the brass section comprised six different trumpeters. The most prominent was Alfredo "Chocolate" Armenteros, a former member of Arsenio Rodríguez's seminal conjunto in the 1940s.

The individual members of the ensemble were seen by other artists as exemplars of their craft. In 1975, Caíto sang on one of the cuts at a recording session at CBS Studios in New York City. This recording session yielded a double album of Cuban dance music and Afro-Cuban folkloric music, the first of a two-album series. These two albums are considered to be among the best recordings of Cuban/Afro-Cuban music made in the 1970s. Chocolate was one of the instrumentalists assembled for this recording date, prior to his joining the cooperative.

After thirty-two years Lino Frías and La Sonora Matancera parted ways in 1976. Lino went on to play on two albums recorded that year with a collection of top singers and musicians under the aegis of Cachao. He was also the pianist and musical director on the first album made by Armando Sánchez and his conjunto. He may have continued in this vein if not for poor health. These three albums were recorded by small, independent labels not controlled by Fania Records. Javier Vázquez followed Lino Frías as pianist and in so doing assumed dual responsibilities with the collective.

In 1977, Miguelito Valdés, having recorded with Sonora Matancera in 1951, did so once more. Contemporary touches were added to the cooperative's instrumentation, with electronic piano, organ and electric guitar employed during this session.

Calixto Leicea stopped recording with the collective in 1978, although he accompanied La Sonora wherever it performed. In that same year, recordings made in 1977 by Miguelito Valdés with the group were re-released.

Five veterans of the glory days were still active with the cooperative at the close of the 1970s.

== The Late Period: 1980s to present day ==
=== The 1980s ===
The decade of the 1980s began with the departure of Yiyo, a member for thirty-two years. He was replaced by Alberto Valdés. Chocolate also left in this year, being succeeded by Héctor "Bomberito" Zarzuela, a long-time member of Pacheco's conjuntos. This year saw the addition of a third trumpet and a third coro vocalist, bringing the number of instrumentalists and singers to twelve.

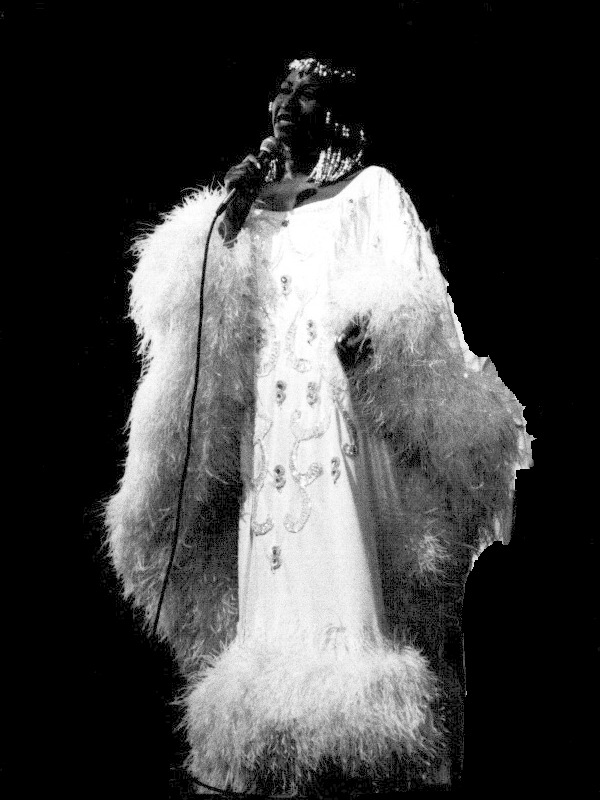
Celia Cruz in performance, 1980.

In 1980, the contrabass and the piano were replaced by electronic counterparts (in the case of the piano for the second time). In this year Celia Cruz returned to record one more album. Rhythm instruments, violins and organ can be heard on several of the recorded numbers, but were possibly an electronic illusion on the part of the pianist and not the actual instruments themselves. Critics saw experiments with electrical effects as emblematic of a loss of originality, although the attempt was a temporary one.

In 1981, La Sonora Matancera recorded an album for Bárbaro Records, a subsidiary of the Fania Records empire co-founded by Johnny Pacheco and Jerry Masucci. The artists on this recording, for the most part, had been specially invited for the recording date. The tres made its return on one number played by Mario Hernández, the much-admired Puerto Rican tresero. Elpidio Vázquez, Jr. also performed on this date as the substitute bass player on one song. He represented the third consecutive generation of his family to be a member of Sonora Matancera. Justo Betancourt was the sonero.

The old guard continued to resurface. Celia Cruz recorded a final album with the ensemble in 1982.

In 1984, the collective recorded with the singer Ismael Miranda. He was for many years sonero with Larry Harlow's orchestra.

1985 was a year of change. Bomberito left, to be replaced by Ken Fradley. Fradley had been a charter member of Saoco, the short-lived but important conjunto. Two artists constituted the coro on Saoco's first album: Yayo el Indio (a member of La Sonora) and Adalberto Santiago (a sonero who would record with La Sonora Matancera in 1993). The individual members of Sonora Matancera, even at this late date, were held in high esteem. The cooperative still attracted top talent, vocalists and instrumentalists alike.

In 1989, La Sonora celebrated its sixty-fifth anniversary of existence. This landmark achievement was commemorated by concerts in Central Park and Carnegie Hall. Their appearance at the last-named venue has been preserved on vinyl. Of the fourteen soneros on this recording, nine were veterans of the gilded age. This was the last occasion when these artists would perform with the collective. In this year Javier Vázquez left after thirteen years as pianist and thirty-two years as chief arranger. José Luis Cruz became the new keyboardist.

=== The 1990s ===
Caíto died in 1990 after sixty-three years with the group. He was succeeded by Fernando Lavoy.

In 1993, La Sonora Matancera recorded an album in Mexico, De Nuevo, with Adalberto Santiago on lead vocals. In the same year Willy "El Baby" Rodríguez rejoined La Sonora. Sonora Matancera lost the services of Yayo el Indio in 1994. He retired as the singer with the longest continuous tenure with the ensemble. At this time the personnel lineup consisted of nine members. Three of them were associated with the cooperative since at least the 1950s.

=== Later history: 2000 to 2013 ===
For traditionalists, the death of Rogelio Martínez on May 13, 2001 marked the end of La Sonora. Javier Vázquez, with the blessing of Rogelio Martínez, Jr., leads a group of the same name in Las Vegas, Nevada.

== Characteristic features ==
La Sonora Matancera is characterized by its use of two trumpets. Furthermore, contrabass, piano, timbalitos, bongós, cencerro, and tumbadora are prominently featured. Sonora Matancera was also distinguished by its backup singers, or coro. It usually consisted of Rogelio Martínez and Carlos Manuel "Caíto" Díaz Alonso, whose falsetto delivery was derived from a traditional singing style of the earliest soneros (called in Cuba voz de vieja).

The group's style in the 1940s was described as "white" or "mulato" in comparison to other groups in the same genre; while race in 1940s/1950s Cuba didn't necessarily mean much in terms of audience it did affect which clubs groups could play in, and access to record production and distribution. The addition of Celia Cruz, according to Ned Sublette, made La Sonora "sound blacker".

== Discography ==
=== Albums ===
- "Sonora Matancera: Sus Grandes Éxitos (para coleccionistas)". Recorded in Cuba from 1945 to 1947. Panart Records, LP-2061, Serie 2000.
- "Daniel Santos con el Conjunto Sonora Matancera". Recorded in Cuba. Panart Records, Volumen 1, LP-2014, Serie 2000.
- "Daniel Santos con el Conjunto Sonora Matancera". Recorded in Cuba. Panart Records, Volumen 2, LP-2076, Serie 2000 .
- "Más ternura con la Sonora Matancera". Various lead singers. Recorded at Estudios CMQ. Seeco Records/SONO-RODVEN, LPS-2026. Compilation issued in 1989.
- "Señor Babalú". Miguelito Valdés con Sonora Matancera y Noro Morales y Su Orquesta. Six sides are with Sonora Matancera and six sides are with Noro Morales. Recorded in the late 1940s (?) and the early 1950s. Tropical Records, TR 5010.
- "Sonora Matancera. Canta: Bienvenido Granda". Recorded in Cuba in 1949. Ansonia Records, ALP 1225.
- "Sonora Matancera. Canta: Bienvenido Granda. "En tu busca". Recorded in Cuba in 1949. Ansonia Records, Volumen 2, SALP 1535.
- "Sonora Matancera". Recorded in Cuba apparently in 1950. Stinson Records, Volume I, Collector's Series, SLP 92.
- "Sonora Matancera, 'Se formó la rumbantela'". Recorded most probably in Cuba apparently in 1950. Stinson Records, Volume II, Collector's Series, Grabaciones Mundiales C. A. 200–3018.
- "Sonora Matancera presenta a Daniel Santos". Tropical Records, TR LP 5109.
- "Grandes Éxitos de Daniel Santos con la Sonora Matancera". Tropical Records, TR LP 5134.
- "La Época de Oro de Daniel Santos con la Orquesta Sonora Matancera". Recorded in Cuba in 1950. RCA FSP-230(e), Volumen II (1950).
- "Una Noche en Caracas con la Sonora Matancera". Various lead singers. Seeco Records, SCLP 9060, Serie de Oro.
- "Canta Nelson Pinedo (Nelson Pinedo Sings). Nelson Pinedo con la Sonora Matancera". Seeco Records, SCLP 9062, Serie de Oro.
- "Canta Celia Cruz (Celia Cruz Sings)". Seeco Records, SCLP 9067, Serie de Oro.
- "Baile con la Sonora Matancera". Carlos Argentino and Estanislao "Laíto" Sureda, lead vocals. Seeco Records, SCLP 9072.
- "Cuba's Queen of Rhythm. Celia Cruz accompanied by Sonora Matancera". Seeco Records, SCLP 9101, Gold Series.
- "Grandes Éxitos de Bienvenido Granda con la Sonora Matancera". Seeco Records, SCLP-9123-H, Gold Series.
- "¡Ahí Viene la Sonora Matancera! (Here Comes Sonora Matancera) con Celio González". Seeco Records, SCLP 9126, Gold Series.
- "Reminiscencias". Leo Marini con la Sonora Matancera. Recorded in Cuba on June 11, 1958. Seeco Records, SCLP-9128-H, Gold Series.
- "La Incomparable Celia". Celia Cruz with Sonora Matancera. Seeco Records, SCLP 9136.
- "Grandes Éxitos de la Sonora Matancera (Great Hits of Sonora Matancera)". Bienvenido Granda, lead vocals. Seeco Records, SCLP 9151.
- "Vicentico Valdés con la Sonora Matancera". Recorded in Cuba on Dec 18, 1958, Estudios CMQ. Seeco Records, SCLP-9154-H, Gold Series.
- "El Inimitable Carlos Argentino con Sonora Matancera". Seeco Records, SCLP-9172. Gold Series.
- "Más Éxitos de Sonora Matancera. Canta Celio González". Seeco Records, SCLP-91770. Gold Series.
- "En El Aire. Carlos Argentino con la Sonora Matancera". Seeco Records, SCLP-9191. Gold Series.
- "La Dinámica Celia Cruz con la Sonora Matancera". Seeco Records, SCLP-9192. Gold Series.
- "Reflexiones de Celia Cruz con la Sonora Matancera". Seeco Records, SCLP-9200.
- "Sonora Matancera en México. Cantan Willy y Alberto". Seeco Records, SCLP-9203.
- "Celebremos Nochebuena con Sonora Matancera". Various lead singers. Seeco Records, SCLP 9206. Gold Series.
- "Canciones Premiadas de Celio González con la Sonora Matancera". Seeco Records, SCLP 9207. Gold Series.
- "Canciones Premiadas de Celia Cruz con la Sonora Matancera". Seeco Records, SCLP-9215. Gold Series.
- "México, qué grande eres. Celia Cruz acompañada por la Sonora Matancera". Recorded in Mexico. Seeco Records, SCLP-9227. Gold Series.
- "La Sonora Matancera. Los Reyes del Ritmo". Cantan Celio González y Willy "El Baby" Rodríguez. Seeco Records Inc., SCLP 9229. Gold Series.
- "La Tierna, Conmovedora, Bamboleadora Celia Cruz con la Sonora Matancera". Seeco Records, SCLP 9246. Gold Series.
- "Sonora Matancera en Puerto Rico. Cantan Celio y Willy". Seeco Records, SCLP-9254. Gold Series.
- "Canciones Inolvidables. Celia Cruz con la Sonora Matancera". Seeco Records, SCLP 9267. Gold Series.
- "Un Brindis Musical por Daniel Santos con Sonora Matancera". Seeco Records, SCLP 9279. Gold Series.
- "Algo Especial por la Sonora Matancera". Bienvenido Granda and Estanislao "Laíto" Sureda, lead vocals. Seeco Records, SCLP-9284.
- "Sarará". Sonora Matancera. Various lead singers. Seeco Records, SCLP 9324.
- "La Sonora Matancera los invita a bailar". Various lead singers. Tropical Records, TRLP-5125.
- "Escucha Mis Canciones. Leo Marini con la Sonora Matancera". Tropical Records, TRLP-5162.
- "Lo Inédito de la Sonora Matancera". Various lead singers. Eco Records/Peerless Records, Serie para Coleccionistas, ECO-25974-9.
- "La Sonora Matancera del Ayer y Sus Cantantes". Various lead singers. Discos Fuentes/Seeco Records Celebrity Series, Vol. 3, Serie Coleccionista, 314082.
- "Sonora Boogaloo". Recorded in 1968–1969. MRVA Records, MRVA 1002.
- "Continuación de Reminiscencias de Leo Marini". Recorded ca. 1969. MRVA Records, MRVA 1005. Re-edited on Orfeón Records, Orfeón 12-937 minus two songs.
- "Salsa con la Sonora Matancera". Three disc boxed set. Welfo Gutiérrez and Gabriel Eladio "Yayo El Indio" Peguero, lead vocals. Orfeón Records, JM-206.
- "Mister Babalú". Miguelito Valdés con la Sonora Matancera. Recorded in 1977. Orfeón Records, JM-233.
- "Pruebe la Salsa de la Sonora Matancera". Orfeón Records, 12-054. Re-edited on LP-16H-5134 in 1978.
- "Welfo Mr. Salsa con la Sonora Matancera". Welfo Gutiérrez, lead vocals. Orfeón Records, 12-1049.
- "Salsa Afrocubana". Miguelito Valdés con la Sonora Matancera. Hecho en México. Orfeón Records, LP-12-1066. This album is a re-release of the above-listed "Mister Babalú". Compilation issued in 1978.
- "Celia Cruz y la Sonora Matancera". Recorded in 1980. Orfeón Records, JM-322.
- "Sonora Matancera con Justo Betancourt". Recorded in 1981. Produced by Javier Vázquez. Bárbaro Records, B 207 0798.
- "15 Éxitos de la Sonora Matancera". Various lead singers. Cubalegre Records, DDD-1439. Compilation released in 1982.
- "Celia Cruz con la Sonora Matancera. Feliz Encuentro". Recorded in 1982. Produced by Javier Vázquez. Bárbaro Records, JM B 212. Serie 0798.
- "BIDISCO/32 Éxitos. Bienvenido Granda con la Sonora Matancera". Peerless Records, Double Album, ADP-530-1. Compilation issued in 1984.
- "30 Años de la Sonora Matancera". Various lead singers. Seeco Records, SSS 3000, Gold Series. Compilation released in 1989.
- "40 Años de la Sonora Matancera". Various lead singers. Seeco Records, Seeco Sonic Sound Series, Double Album, SSD 1001.
- "50 Años de la Sonora Matancera". Various lead singers. Seeco Records, Double Album SSD 4001, Compilation issued in 1975.
- "60° Aniversario de la Sonora Matancera". Various lead singers. Seeco Records/Peerless Records, MSTV 4003-5/MCTV 4003-9. Compilation released in 1984.
- "Celebrando con la Sonora Matancera/65 Aniversario". Various lead singers. Seeco Records/TH-RODVEN Records, Inc. TH-2630. Compilation issued in 1989.
- "Gilda Mirós Presents: Sonora Matancera Live! from Carnegie Hall. 65th Anniversary Celebration". Various lead singers. Recorded in 1989. Team Enterprises, Double Album T-7030.

=== Cassette Tapes ===
- "La Sonora Matancera. Recordando A Cuba". Various lead singers. Recorded in Cuba. Panart P-8001.
- "Canta Bienvenido Granda (Bienvenido Granda Sings). El Nuevo Sonido". Seeco Records, SCLP 9065, Gold Series.
- "Argentina's Favorite Troubadour. Leo Marini Sings". Leo Marini con La [sic] Sonora Matancera. Seeco Records, SCCA 9071.
- "Carlos Argentino Sings". Carlos Argentino/Sonora Matancera. Seeco Records, SCCA 9100. Gold Series.
- "Desfile de Estrellas". La Sonora Matancera. Various lead singers. Seeco Records, SCCA 9120, Gold Series.
- "Grandes Éxitos de Celia Cruz con La [sic] Sonora Matancera". Seeco Records, SCCA 9124, Gold Series.
- "Yo Canto Para Ti (I Sing For You)". Carlos Argentino con La [sic] Sonora Matancera. Seeco Records, SCCA 9127, Gold Series.
- "La Sonora Matancera Llegó. Canta Celio González". Seeco Records, SCCA 9156, Gold Series.
- "Alberto Beltrán con la Sonora Matancera. Canta Sus Mejores Éxitos". Seeco Records, SCLP-9302.
- "Cuba's Foremost Rhythm Singer Celia Cruz. Accompanied by Sonora Matancera". Seeco Records, SCCA 432.

=== Compact Discs ===
- "La Sonora Matancera 'En Vivo'". Edición Limitada. One song from a film and live recordings. Various lead singers. Bohío Records.
- "La ola marina". Conjunto Sonora Matancera. Recorded in Havana, Cuba in 1944. Tumbao Cuban Classics, TCD-114. Compilation released in 2002.
- "Se formó la rumbantela". Sonora Matancera. Recorded in Havana, Cuba in the mid-1940s. Tumbao Cuban Classics, TCD-045. Compilation issued in 1994.
- "Bobby Capó con La Sonora Matancera". Recorded in Cuba on June 9, 1948 and January 4, 1952. Seeco Records, SCCD-9356, Gold Series.
- "Daniel Santos y Bienvenido Granda con la Sonora Matancera". Vol. 2. Recorded live in Havana, Cuba in 1949, 1950, and 1953. CD Sonora.
- "La Guarachera de Cuba. Celia Cruz con la Sonora Matancera". Recorded at Estudios CMQ, 1950–1953. Tumbao Cuban Classics, TCD-091.
- "Celia Cruz con La [sic] Sonora Matancera". Vol. 5. Live recordings on Radio CMQ, 1951–1952. Bárbaro Records, CD 230. Compilation released in 1995.
- "Sonora Matancera Live on the radio 1952–1958". Various lead singers. Harlequin Records, HQ CD 79.
- "Sonora Matancera Live on the radio 1952–1958". Vol. 2. Various lead singers. Harlequin Records.
- "Celia Cruz con La [sic] Sonora Matancera". Vol. 1. Live recordings on Radio Progreso, 1953–1954. Bárbaro Records, CD 226. Compilation issued in 1995.
- "Celia Cruz con La [sic] Sonora Matancera". Vol. 2. Live recordings on Radio Progreso, 1955. Bárbaro Records, CD 227. Compilation released in 1995.
- "Celia Cruz con La [sic] Sonora Matancera". Vol. 3. Live recordings on Radio Progreso, 1956. Bárbaro Records, CD 228. Compilation issued in 1995.
- "Algo Nuevo de lo Añejo de la Sonora Matancera". Para coleccionistas. Live recordings. Various lead singers. Yumurí Records. 1032.
- "Algo Nuevo de lo Añejo de la Sonora Matancera". Para coleccionistas. Live recordings. Various lead singers. Yumurí Records, Volume II.
- "Algo Nuevo de lo Añejo de la Sonora Matancera". Para coleccionistas. Live recordings. Various lead singers. Yumurí Records, Volume III.
- "La Sonora Matancera. ¡En Vivo!. Inéditas". Live recordings. Various lead singers. Cubanacán Records, CUCD 1707.
- "Los Últimos de Celio González acompañado por la Sonora Matancera". Seeco/Tropical, STR 90523.
- "La Inolvidable Sonora Matancera". Various lead singers. Notes by Carlos Deiby Velásquez. Discos Fuentes/Seeco Records, D16197.
- "La Sonora trae un tono. La Sonora Matancera en CMQ, 1957". Cantan Celio González y Carlos Argentino. Tumbao Cuban Classics, TCD-096.
- "La Sonora Matancera. El nuevo sonido fabuloso". Cantan Elliot Romero y Justo Betancourt. Seeco Records, SCCD 9282. Gold Series.
- "La Niña de Guatemala en Ritmo de Guantanamera". La Sonora Matancera. Various lead singers. West Side Latino Records Corp., WSCD-4311. Compilation released in 2000.
- "Sonora Matancera-Ismael Miranda". Recorded in New York City in 1984. Produced by Javier Vázquez. Fania Records, Música Latina International, JM 632.

== Filmography ==
- "El nacimiento de la rumba", 1937.
- "Tam Tam Edén", 1937. Filmed in Havana, Cuba. One source says that the title of this film short is "Tam Tam: la historia de la rumba" and that it was shot in 1936.
- "El ángel caído", 1948. With Daniel Santos and Rosita Quintana.
- "Escuela de modelos", 1949. With Alberto Garrido.
- "Música, mujeres y piratas", 1950. With Leopoldo Fernández, "Pototo", and Aníbal de Mar, "Filomeno".
- Ritmos del Caribe (also known as "Borrasca"; one source claims that "Borrasca" is the name of a totally different movie), 1950. With Daniel Santos, Amalia Aguilar and Rita Montaner.
- "La mentira", 1952. With Bienvenido Granda, Marga López and Jorge Mistral.
- Cinnamon Skin, 1953. With Sara Montiel, Pedro Vargas and Fernando Casanova.
- "A romper el coco", 1954. With Amalia Aguilar.
- "Me gustan todas", 1954. With Adalberto "Resortes" Martínez, Eulalio "Piporro" González and Rosita Fornés.
- "Una gallega en La Habana", 1955. With Nelson Pinedo, Celia Cruz, Ramón "Diplo" Rivero and Niní Marshall.
- "¡¡Olé Cuba!!", 1957. With Celia Cruz, Celio González, Pototo and Filomeno.
- "Amorcito corazón", 1961. With Celia Cruz, Alberto Pérez Sierra, Willy "El Baby" Rodríguez, Rosita Quintana and Mauricio Garcés.

== Bibliography ==
- Serna, Carlos E. and Marco T. Barros Ariza. La Sonora Matancera, Más de 60 Años de Historia Musical. Medellín, Colombia: Editorial Fuentes, 1990.
- Valverde, Humberto. Memorias de la Sonora Matancera. Univalle, Colombia: Editorial Caimán Records, 1997.
- Zaldívar, Mario. El mito de la Sonora Matancera. San José, Costa Rica. 1999.
- Portaccio Fontalvo, José. Ochenta Años de la Sonora Matancera. Bogotá, Colombia. 2004.
- Ramírez Bedoya, Héctor. Historia de la Sonora Matancera. 2 vols.
- Edwards, David and Mike Callahan. Seeco Album Discography. New York: Quartet Books, 2002.
