= All Night Long (1981 film) =

1981 film directed by Jean-Claude Tramont

- Original film poster
- Directed by: Jean-Claude Tramont
- Written by: W. D. Richter
- Produced by: Leonard Goldberg; Jerry Weintraub
- Starring: Gene Hackman; Barbra Streisand; Diane Ladd; Dennis Quaid; Kevin Dobson
- Cinematography: Philip H. Lathrop
- Edited by: Rachel Igel; Marion Rothman
- Music by: Richard Hazard; Ira Newborn
- Distributed by: Universal Pictures
- Release date: March 6, 1981
- Running time: 88 minutes
- Country: United States
- Language: English
- Budget: $15 million
- Box office: $4,454,295

All Night Long is a 1981 American romantic comedy film directed by Jean-Claude Tramont and starring Gene Hackman, Barbra Streisand, Diane Ladd, Dennis Quaid, Kevin Dobson and William Daniels. It was written by W. D. Richter.

== Plot ==
George Dupler, a married man nearing middle age, is demoted after a temper tantrum at work and throwing a chair out of his boss Ralph Shuster's window) and reduced to working as the midnight-shift manager of an all-night pharmacy/convenience store.

George's 18-year-old son, Freddie, is having an affair with Cheryl Gibbons, an older, married woman, who also happens to be Freddie's fourth cousin. George advises Freddie to stop the affair before it leads to any trouble, but Freddie declares that he might love her. One night at the store, George finally meets Cheryl, an untalented singer-songwriter married to volatile firefighter Bobby and she begins to show an interest in him. After a while, the interest is mutual.

George goes to Cheryl's house to return her cigarette lighter. She offers to show George the paint job Freddie has done in her bedroom. George and Cheryl are about to get intimate, when Freddie comes over to see Cheryl for another tryst. George escapes before Freddie can see him, but Cheryl decides to tell Freddie about the affair she is having with his dad. The next day, when George is trying to sleep, and his wife, Helen, is having a French class, Freddie confronts his father, trying to fight him. Helen hears about the affair and George leaves. When she demands a divorce, George agrees.

George ends up quitting his job and leasing a loft where he can pursue his dream of being an inventor. George goes to an anniversary party where everybody he knows is there, including his family, plus Cheryl and Bobby. He realizes Bobby is aware of the affair with his wife. George takes Cheryl away from the party and her husband. Even though Cheryl loves him, she thinks he is too good for her.

Cheryl goes to the fire station where Bobby works to talk to him. Bobby ends up yelling at her and is about to hit her when the fire alarm goes off. He and all of the firemen leave, whereupon we see that it was George who reported the nonexistent fire.

Cheryl moves into George's place. Freddie has accepted the situation and helps her move in, showing that he and his dad have reconciled.

== Cast ==
- Gene Hackman as George Dupler
- Barbra Streisand as Cheryl Gibbons
- Dennis Quaid as Freddie Dupler
- Diane Ladd as Helen Dupler
- Kevin Dobson as Bobby Gibbons
- William Daniels as Richard H. Copleston
- Hamilton Camp as Buggoms
- Terry Kiser as Ralph Shuster
- Charles Siebert as Nevins
- Vernee Watson as Emily
- Raleigh Bond as Ultra-Save Doctor
- Annie Girardot as French Teacher
- Ann Doran as Grandmother Gibbons
- Jim Nolan as Grandfather Gibbons
- Judy Kerr as Joan Gibbons
- Marlyn Gates as Jennifer Gibbons
- Mitzi Hoag as Nurse
- Chris Mulkey as Russell Monk
- Steve Peterman as Leon
- Richard Stahl as Pharmacist
- Faith Minton as Holdup Woman
- Jessie Lawrence Ferguson as Jacob Horowitz
- Nicholas Mele as Shoplifter
- Bonnie Bartlett as Patricia
- Irene Tedrow as Landlady
- Peggy Pope as Waitress
- Paul Valentine as Customer

== Production ==
The film was originally planned as a low-budget release with Gene Hackman and Lisa Eichhorn in the leading roles. Agent Sue Mengers, who was married to the film's director, Jean-Claude Tramont, suggested Barbra Streisand, her longtime client and close friend, for the part of Cheryl Gibbons instead of Eichhorn, even though filming was already under way. Streisand was paid $4 million for starring in the film, the highest salary for an actor up to that time. The film's subsequent failure at the box office contributed to Streisand's decision to fire Mengers.

Prominent in the musical soundtrack is "La Violetera", a composition by José Padilla which had been featured previously in Charlie Chaplin's City Lights.

== Reception ==
The film received mostly negative reviews, though some critics cited Streisand's performance as one of her best. On review aggregator Rotten Tomatoes, 33% of 9 reviews are positive, and the average rating is 5.4/10.

Stephen Holden, in Rolling Stone magazine, gave the film a positive review, adding that Streisand's performance suggested Marilyn Monroe. Pauline Kael in The New Yorker was full of praise: "The director, Jean-Claude Tramont, a Belgian who has worked in American television, is a sophisticated jokester. There may be a suggestion of Lubitsch and of Max Ophüls in his approach, and there is more than a suggestion of Jacques Tati. Gene Hackman, whose specialty has been believable, lived-in characters, gives one of his most likable performances." Gary Arnold of The Washington Post also praised Hackman's performance, calling it "the most endearing of his career, an impression of frustrated but resilient middle-class masculinity that should evoke as much recognition and rooting interest among men as women seemed to derive from Ellen Burstyn's role in Alice Doesn't Live Here Anymore."

== Awards ==
Streisand was nominated for a Golden Raspberry Award for Worst Actress for her performance at the 2nd Golden Raspberry Awards. Gene Hackman was nominated for a 2nd place National Society of Film Critics Award for Best Actor for his performance at the 1981 National Society of Film Critics Awards.

== Box office ==
The movie was a flop. It opened at No. 1 on the American film charts with an opening weekend of $1,391,000. The Independent Movie Data Base website lists the film's total U.S. gross as less than $4.5 million. William Goldman shared in Adventures in the Screen Trade that the original $3 million budget ballooned to $15 million, in part because of the addition of Streisand. With prints and advertising costs, Goldman reports the studio Universal Pictures lost at least $20 million on the film.
