= Los Shadows =

EP by The Shadows
- Released: 1963
- Recorded: 1963; Barcelona, Spain
- Genre: Rock

Los Shadows is an extended play 45 rpm record released by The Shadows. It reached #4 in the UK EP charts in 1963.

== Description ==
The four songs chosen, as well as the title of the record, have a definite Spanish and Latinamerican flavor to them; the author of Granada (a town in Spain), Agustín Lara, was Mexican, Julio César Sanders, author of Adios Muchachos (Pablo the Dreamer) was Argentinian, while the lyricist, César Vedani, is not credited on the Shadows instrumental version. José Padilla, who composed "Valencia" (another town in Spain) in 1924 and Augusto Algueró author of Las Tres Carabelas, were Spaniards.

== Track listing ==
Side 1

- Granada (Lara)
- Adios Muchachos (Pablo the Dreamer) (Sanders)

Side 2

- Valencia (Padilla)
- Las Tres Carabelas (Three Galleons) (Alguero Jr.)

== Personnel ==
- Hank Marvin – Lead guitar
- Bruce Welch – Rhythm guitar
- Brian Locking – Bass guitar
- Brian Bennett – Drums
- Norrie Paramor Strings

The record was recorded in Barcelona on April 27, 1963.
