= The Violet Seller =

1958 film

- Theatrical release poster
- Spanish: La Violetera
- Italian: La bella fioraia di Madrid
- Directed by: Luis César Amadori
- Screenplay by: Jesús María de Arozamena
- Story by: Manuel Villegas López; Jesús María de Arozamena; André Tabet
- Produced by: Benito Perojo; Miguel Tudela
- Starring: Sara Montiel; Raf Vallone; Frank Villard; Tomás Blanco; Ana Mariscal
- Cinematography: Antonio L. Ballesteros
- Edited by: Antonio Ramírez de Loaysa
- Music by: Juan Quintero
- Color process: Eastmancolor
- Production companies: Producciones Benito Perojo (Spain); Vic Film (Italy); Trevi Cinematográfica (Italy)
- Distributed by: Dipenfa S.A. (Spain); Lux Film (Italy)
- Release dates: 6 April 1958 (Spain); 29 June 1959 (Italy)
- Running time: 108 minutes
- Countries: Spain; Italy
- Language: Spanish

The Violet Seller, better known under its Spanish title La Violetera, is a 1958 Spanish–Italian historical jukebox musical film produced by Benito Perojo, directed by Luis César Amadori and starring Sara Montiel, Raf Vallone, Frank Villard, Tomás Blanco and Ana Mariscal.

The film was inspired by the song "La Violetera" composed by José Padilla in 1914, with lyrics by Eduardo Montesinos, that is incarnated in the film by Montiel as Soledad, a street violets seller who, after meeting and breaking with Fernando, the love of her life, becomes a famous singer who sings the song in her concerts.

The Violet Seller received excellent reviews upon its release on 6 April 1958, although some reviewers found the plot too trite and conventional. Montiel's performance was widely praised while the production and the remaining main cast received generally positive reviews. It was immensely popular in Spain and it had a wide international release making it the worldwide highest-grossing Spanish-language film made up to that point.

The film's soundtrack album garnered also excellent reviews, had a wide international release and received a Golden Disk award for the number of records sold.

== Plot ==
Madrid. 31 December 1899. On New Year's Eve, Soledad, a street violets seller and a novice variety show singer at Salón Bolero café-concert, meets Fernando, an influential and wealthy aristocrat, at the door of the Apolo Theatre, and they immediately fall in love with each other.

Fernando is under constant pressure from his older brother Duke Don Alfonso, who reminds him of his duties, including his engagement to Countess Doña Magdalena. Even though their union is impossible due to social inequality, Fernando opposes the social norms and causes a scandal in Madrid's high society circle by moving Soledad into a luxurious apartment and announcing their engagement. Alfonso dies in a duel trying to defend Fernando's honor. Now being a Duke, feeling guilty of his brother's death and trying to obey his will, Fernando breaks up with Soledad. But, only some hours later, he realizes that he can not live without her and he returns to the apartment that she has just left to go to Paris with Henri Garnal, an important theatrical French producer that was impressed when seeing her singing that same day.

In Paris, Soledad becomes a famous singer star. Fernando marries Magdalena and leaves Spain when appointed ambassador to Brazil while Soledad gives concerts in the best theatres all around Europe accompanied by Garnal. In her debut in Madrid, Soledad and Fernando meet again, he tries to explain what happened, confesses her his love and asks her to leave with him; she confesses her love back but she eventually refuses him. When going to the United States for her debut on Broadway, Soledad survives seriously ill and Garnal dies on the sinking of the RMS Titanic. After a long recovery, having lost her singing voice, sad and lonely, she can not manage to get a job in Paris and she runs out of money.

Nearly ten years after becoming a widower, Fernando returns to Madrid, on New Year's Eve, when he is appointed to be a minister in the government. He finds Soledad at Salón Bolero, trying to make a modest come back lip-synching "La Violetera" to one of her old recordings in front of an audience, with the orchestra miming. She is stunned when she sees him, and misses her cue, but she gathers her courage and, with great effort, is able to sing in tune the song in full when the orchestra starts to play the music live. They come together in a big hug and they kiss each other while the people in the hall celebrate the New Year.

== Cast ==
- Sara Montiel as Soledad Moreno
- Raf Vallone as Fernando Arlés
- Frank Villard as Henri Garnal
- Tomás Blanco as Alfonso Arlés
- Pastor Serrador as Carlos
- Ana Mariscal as Magdalena
- Tony Soler as Lola
- Félix Fernández as Salón Bolero owner
- Robert Pizani as maestro
- Charles Fawcett as Van de Ritzen
- Aurora García Alonso as lottery seller
- Laura Valenzuela as girl with maestro
- Julia Delgado Caro as Isabel
- Julio Goróstegui as Excelencia
- Carmen Rodríguez as flowers seller at Maxim's
- Vicente Soler as drunk
- Blanquita Suárez as old singer
- Nora Samsó as woman in gallery
- Modesto Blanch as man in gallery
- María Francés as clinic administrator
- María Gámez as woman

== Production ==
=== Development ===
After the unexpected success of Montiel's singing leading role in The Last Torch Song, a low-budget musical film that became a blockbuster, in June 1957 she signed with producer Benito Perojo a lavish contract to make four films in three years, being the first of them The Violet Seller, a large-budget international co-production musical film that was initially intended for Carmen Sevilla. Montiel retained some control over the production in regards to the songs and her wardrobe. The economic agreement was ten million pesetas (Note: In Spain, ten million pesetas (€60,101) in 1957, adjusted for inflation using the consumer price index, in 2022 would be approximately €3 million, while its purchasing power would be €10–16 million.) (US$240,000 as of 1957) (Note: The exchange rate in June 1957 was of forty-two pesetas to the United States dollar.) for four films, which means that she was to receive 2.5 million pesetas (US$60,000) per film, making her the highest-paid Spanish star at a time when the highest-paid stars were netting one million pesetas (US$24,000) per film. With the success of The Violet Seller, and in a contractual dispute for the next film, A Girl Against Napoleon, the agreement was improved by securing for her the twenty per cent of the producer's net revenue. Many years later, she began to say that she had been paid more than US$1 million (forty-two million pesetas) for each of these films, and the press widely reported it as the actual figure. On 28 September 1957, she arrived in Madrid from the United States, where she resided at the time, for the production of The Violet Seller.

Jesús María de Arozamena wrote the script and the dialogues of the film based on the plot lines written by himself and Manuel Villegas López and adapted by André Tabet. Following the formula that proved successful in The Last Torch Song, composers Juan Quintero and Gregorio García Segura arranged a list of cuplés, made famous at the late nineteenth century and early twentieth century by singers with high-pitched voices like Raquel Meller, to fit Montiel's low-pitched sensual voice and the corresponding musical numbers were tucked into the plot and were carefully staged to make her shine on-screen. Her role was initially scripted to sing only three songs, but she insisted on including up to twelve songs. (Note: In the Spanish version of the film, Montiel sings eleven different songs and she reprises "La Violetera" with a different arrangement. She sings an additional song, "Cuore ingrato «Catarí»" that, although not present in the Spanish version, appears in the foreign version released in some countries.) She even selected the songs, supervised their arrangement and recording and made sure they fit the plot properly. She also required the hiring of top international stars to stage along her, which were Italian Raf Vallone and French Frank Villard, although Jean-Claude Pascal was initially announced instead Villard.

Quintero also composed and conducted the film score and the songs were recorded at the Hispavox studios in Madrid. Joaquín Esparza designed the costumes. Humberto Cornejo and Spanish haute couture firms Vargas Ochagavía and Marbel dressed Montiel. Vargas Ochagavía also dressed Mariscal and Cornejo also provided the general wardrobe.

=== Filming ===
Principal photography began in November 1957 under the direction of Luis César Amadori, and took place at CEA Studios in Madrid where the full-scale period sets were constructed under the art direction of Enrique Alarcón. These included, among others, the full-scale sets of the Calle de Alcalá in front of the Apolo Theatre, a sumptuous ballroom with a full orchestra, the popular café-concert hall and those resembling the famous Lhardy and Maxim's restaurants. It was mainly filmed on studio by cinematographer Antonio L. Ballesteros in colorful Eastmancolor and 1.37:1 aspect ratio, with only a few scenes filmed on location in Madrid in places such as the Fountain of Galápagos at the Buen Retiro Park and the Delicias railway station. As the film was a co-production with Italy, after a couple of days of promotion in Rome that included a welcome at Ciampino Airport and a reception at Palazzo Barberini on 18 January 1958, they filmed some scenes in Turin and in Milan to comply with the requisites in place to be a co-production. They filmed some exterior footage afterwards on location in Paris in the rue du Chevalier-de-La-Barre and in the stairs of the rue du Calvaire at the butte of Montmartre and on the Petit Pont with Notre-Dame in the background. Filming was completed in February 1958. (Note: According to the shooting schedule published weekly in Primer Plano film magazine, the week of 9–13 December 1957 was the third week of filming and the week of 24–28 February 1958 was the thirteenth and last. Filming in Madrid was scheduled in weeks three to seven, filming in Italy and Paris in eight to eleven and filming in an actual theatre in twelve and thirteen. Week five took two actual weeks due to the Christmas holidays.)

As usual in those days, the filming was done without recording live sound, so the dialogues, the soundtrack and the sound effects were added during post-production. For the original language version, Spanish actors were dubbed by themselves and foreigners were dubbed by Spanish voice actors. On 26 February 1958, Montiel flew back to the United States after completing all her work in the film.

=== Censorship and double version ===
The film had to deal during production with Francoist film censors that condemned what, according to them, was an immorality in some plot lines, an excessive sensuality of Montiel on-screen and an excessive love effusiveness between the protagonists. As was customary in co-productions with other countries, the film was edited in double version, one censored for the Spanish and similar markets and other uncensored for less strict foreign markets.

Both versions differ in the length of the love kisses between the protagonists –shorter in the Spanish version– and in Montiel's attire in one of the scenes –where she wears a negligee that reveals her cleavage in the foreign version while she wears a formal dress in the Spanish version–. In addition to the effects of censorship, in the foreign version –that runs for ninety minutes– several songs were removed and in the musical number of Soledad on tour around Europe some footage was replaced with other –not present in the Spanish version– showing her singing "Cuore ingrato".

The film premiered in Spain only authorized for audiences over sixteen years old. This rating was lowered to only authorized for audiences over fourteen years old later on its theatrical run. Many years later, it was finally rated as suitable for all ages.

== Release ==
=== Premiere and initial release ===
The Violet Seller opened on 6 April 1958 in Spain. That same evening, the formal premiere was held in a grand gala at the 1,400-seat Rialto Theatre in Madrid, with a big crowd blocking the Gran Vía. The demand for tickets was so high at the Rialto that they had to start selling them up to five days in advance to avoid crowds at the ticket window. The film was running there for thirty-one weeks, making it the second highest grossing film in Madrid in the 1950s, (Note: Back then in Spain, boxoffice grosses were a secret kept by exhibitors for tax reasons. The only guide to estimate them was the length of the first-run and the capacity of the venue. It was not made mandatory to officially communicate the number of tickets sold until 1 January 1965.) only surpassed by The Last Torch Song. On 11 April, it opened at the 1,643-seat Tívoli Theatre in Barcelona, and it was running there for twenty-six weeks. After its exclusive first-run in over twenty-five theatres in major Spanish cities, it entered general release the following season and was running across the country for several years. In Italy, it opened on 29 June 1959 in three theatres in Rome.

The film had a wide international release with the dialogues dubbed or subtitled into other languages in non-Spanish speaking countries, while the songs kept in their original version. Perojo claimed to have received offers from Metro-Goldwyn-Mayer and Columbia Pictures for the world release of the film but that he had already pre-sold the rights to distributors in some countries. In Mexico and some other country, it was released in Mexiscope format. In English it was initially titled Buy My Violets, but although its official title is The Violet Seller, it is widely named under its Spanish title La Violetera. The rentals worldwide were initially estimated in over US$5 million, beating The Last Torch Song, the worldwide highest-grossing Spanish-language film made up to that point, and catapulting Montiel's career as an actress and a singer even more.

The foreign version opened on 10 July 1959 in France with the dialogues adapted to French by Georges Tabet. On 18 July, it premiered in Paris at the 4,670-seat Gaumont-Palace, the largest cinema in the world at the time. In two years, it sold two million tickets across France, reaching 2.7 million tickets sold in the following years.

=== Home media ===
In 1958, Publicaciones Fher, as part of its Mandolina collection, published the official photonovel of the film in eight installments of sixteen black-and-white pages each within its "Cine Ensueño" series and a song book with the plot of the film and the lyrics of the songs that were sold at newsstands. The film was later released on videocassette and DVD several times in different countries, and after a digital High-definition remastering and restoration, it was released on 13 March 2014 on Blu-ray in Spain.

== Reception ==
Montiel was praised for her performance.

=== Critical response ===
Upon its release, the press generally gave The Violet Seller excellent reviews; however, while its production values and acting were universally recognized, some reviewers of the time found the plot too trite and conventional.

A. Martínez Tomás wrote for La Vanguardia that the plot is only a pretext for an artistic and personal exaltation of Sara Montiel, it is full of clichés, the anachronisms are blatant throughout it and the action has a very conventional line but its attractive force and its aesthetic emotion are maintained throughout the film. ABC, in its Seville edition, felt that in a national film had never been such brilliant nuances, to attract attention and suggest the viewer, who follows the incidents of the emotional and entertaining narration so closely that the growing interest in each scene becomes irrepressible until its culmination.

Much of the praise was reserved for Montiel in particular, for her acting, singing, charming, beauty and sensuality. ABC felt that such is her performance that no Spanish actress could surpass her in this performance, inimitable, natural and unique, which undoubtedly reaches the character of quite an event. Vallone, Villard, Blanco, Serrador, Soler and Mariscal were also praised for their performances. Other aspects of the production praised were the "attractive and sumptuous" costumes, the "beautiful" Alarcón scenography, the "graceful" selection of songs, the "excellent" Ballesteros cinematography and the "expert and clever" Amadori direction.

On the other hand, some reviewers at the time were not so enthusiastic, such as Film Ideal giving it just a three out of seven rating. (Note: Film Ideal magazine gave the film an "Average" rating on a scale of: "Very Good", "Good", "Less Good", "Fair", "Average", "Bad" and "Very Bad".)

=== Accolades ===
On 19 September 1958, the Rialto Theatre honored Montiel with a great reception and the presentation of a commemorative plaque, which was later placed at the theatre lobby, upon reaching eighteen consecutive months topping its billboard with two of her films, The Last Torch Song first and The Violet Seller later, a record never before achieved by Spanish cinema in first-run in Madrid.

On 2 December 1958, at the 1958 Triunfo magazine annual vox populi poll, The Violet Seller received the Award for Best Spanish Picture and Montiel received the Award for Best Spanish Actress. On 24 January 1959, at the 1958 Circle of Cinematographic Writers Awards, Montiel received the Medal for Best Actress and Alarcón received the Medal for Best Set Decoration. On 30 January 1959, at the 1959 National Syndicate of Spectacle Awards, the film received the second place Award for Best Picture, endowed with 250,000 pesetas, and Montiel received the Award for Best Actress.

In addition, The Violet Seller and Miracles of Thursday represented Spain at the special onetime World Film Festival organized within the 1958 Brussels World's Fair.

=== Critical re-evaluation ===
In revisiting the film recently critics give the film mixed reviews; although its historical value within the History of Spanish cinema is universally recognized, they find it old-fashioned, sexist and overemotional.

Guillermo Altares wrote in 1994 for El País that its cinematographic value nowadays is almost non-existent. Cristina Veganzones wrote in 2016 for ABC that one of the most sexist phrases in History is sung by Montiel in "Es mi hombre". Fernando Méndez-Leite stated in 2018 in Televisión Española that the film is not exactly a musical film, it is a melodrama with songs.

== Soundtrack ==
Sara Montiel Performs The Songs Of The Film "The Violet Seller"

Soundtrack album by Sara Montiel
- Released: 1958
- Studio: Hispavox
- Genre: Cuplé; chotis; chanson populaire
- Label: Hispavox

Sara Montiel chronology
Baile con Sara Montiel (1958)	Sara Montiel Performs The Songs Of The Film "The Violet Seller" (1958)	Besos de fuego (1958)
- "La Violetera" A sample of Sara Montiel's cover of "La Violetera" by José Padilla and Eduardo Montesinos from The Violet Seller

The Violet Seller is a jukebox musical film featuring popular music songs known in the early twentieth century. Montiel sings eleven different songs in the Spanish version of the film, that Quintero and García Segura arranged to fit her low-pitched sensual voice. Most of the songs are Spanish cuplés but there are also Madrilenian chotis and French popular chansons sang partially or totally in French. She sings "La Violetera" title song twice with two different arrangements. She additionally sings a Neapolitan song that, although not present in the Spanish version of the film, appears in the foreign version released in some countries. There are two other cuplés in the film performed by Tony Soler and another performed by Blanquita Suárez. The presence of some of the songs in the film is anachronistic, as they were actually released later.

The songs appear in the film in the following order, performed by Montiel and in Spanish, except where noted:

1. "La primavera" by Soler
2. "El Polichinela"
3. "Rosa de Madrid"
4. "Mimosa"
5. "Soy castañera" by Soler
6. "Mala entraña"
7. "Bajo los puentes de París" partially in French
8. "Es mi hombre" with phrases in French
9. "Frou Frou" fully in French
10. "La Violetera"
11. "Agua que no has de beber"
12. "Tus ojitos negros"
13. "Cuore ingrato" fully in Neapolitan and only in the foreign version
14. "Flor de té"
15. "Venga alegría" by Suárez
16. "La Violetera" (bis)

=== Release ===
After the success of The Last Torch Song soundtrack album, Montiel signed a contract with Hispavox to record and release the soundtrack albums of her next films, starting with The Violet Seller, for which she secured the ten per cent of the record sales as royalties from the recordings.

The songs of the film were recorded at the Hispavox studios in Madrid just before the filming. Hispavox released the album with the full studio versions of the songs sung by Montiel titled Sara Montiel interpreta las canciones de la película «La Violetera» (transl. Sara Montiel Performs The Songs Of The Film "The Violet Seller") originally in Spain in 1958 in one LP and three EPs. The album was subsequently released in different vinyl editions in Argentina, Bolivia, Brazil, Canada, Chile, Colombia, France, Greece, Israel, Italy, Japan, Mexico, Peru, Portugal, the United States and Venezuela. (Note: The soundtrack was released under the English titles Sara Montiel Interpret The Songs Of The Film La Violetera in Israel and La Violetera, Original Sound Track Recording in Canada and the United States.)

The songs in all released editions are those performed by Montiel in the film. The three songs performed by other singers, "Soy castañera" (by Larruga) and "La primavera" (by Cadenas, Retana, Badía) performed by Soler and "Venga alegría" (by Tecglen, Casanova) performed by Suárez, were not included in any of the editions. The film score composed by Quintero was also not released commercially.

==== Commercial performance ====
The soundtrack topped sales in Spain since its release and Montiel received a check for 300,000 pesetas (US$6,000 as of 1958) for first quarter sales. A year later, in July 1959, Hispavox acknowledged Montiel by serving her a Golden Disk for topping the company's sales in Spain and Latin America with the soundtrack.

==== Critical response ====
Professional ratings
Review scores
Source	Rating
Billboard	5/5 stars

The soundtrack album also garnered excellent national and international reviews upon its initial releases. In the United States, on 27 October 1958, Billboard magazine picked it as "The International Album Billboard Spotlight Winner of the Week" for being one of the best releases in the Columbia Records' "Adventures In Sound" series. Three years later, on 25 September 1961, Billboard rated the album reissue with "Four Stars Strong Sales Potential" rating.

=== Track listing ===
The album was originally released in Spain in one LP and three EPs. The LP features all Montiel's songs from the film except for two, "El Polichinela" and "Es mi hombre", which were released on two separate EPs, and were replaced on the LP by the songs "Gitana" and "Nada" not featured in the film. For subsequently single-disc full editions, both songs from the film were reinstated, with the added ones no longer appearing.

==== Spanish original edition ====
LP - HH 1114 - Side A
No.	Title	Writer(s)	Conductor / arrangement	Length
1.	"La Violetera"	Padilla; Montesinos	García Segura	3:36
2.	"Mimosa"	Martínez Abades	Quintero	2:38
3.	"Flor de té"	Martínez Abades	Quintero	2:46
4.	"Bajo los puentes de París (Sous les ponts de Paris) (Note: Version fully in Spanish. Montiel also recorded the full version in French of the song which was not released commercially.)"	Scotto	Quintero	2:30
5.	"Gitana (Note: The songs "Gitana" and "Nada" do not appear in the film. In the Spanish LP original edition they replaced "El Polichinela" and "Es mi hombre (Mon Homme)", which were released on two separate EPs, and are replaced by them in all other single-disc full editions.)"	Tabet		2:20
6.	"Frou Frou"	Chatau	Quintero	2:59

LP - HH 1114 - Side B
No.	Title	Writer(s)	Conductor / arrangement	Length
1.	"Mala entraña"	Martínez Abades	Quintero	2:18
2.	"Rosa de Madrid"	Soriano; Barta	Quintero	2:15
3.	"Nada"	Camorra; Segura; Montiel		3:17
4.	"Tus ojitos negros"	Vivas; Barta	García Segura	2:33
5.	"Cuore ingrato «Catarí»"	Cardillo; Cordiferro	Quintero	2:31
6.	"Agua que no has de beber"	Martínez Abades	García Segura	2:25
7.	"La Violetera (bis)"	Padilla; Montesinos	Quintero	4:20

EP - HH 1751 - Side A
No.	Title	Writer(s)	Conductor / arrangement	Length
1.	"La Violetera"	Padilla; Montesinos	García Segura	3:36
2.	"Bajo los puentes de París (Sous les ponts de Paris)"	Scotto	Quintero	2:30

EP - HH 1751 - Side B
No.	Title	Writer(s)	Conductor / arrangement	Length
1.	"Mimosa"	Martínez Abades	Quintero	2:38
2.	"Flor de té"	Martínez Abades	Quintero	2:46

EP - HH 1752 - Side A
No.	Title	Writer(s)	Conductor / arrangement	Length
1.	"El Polichinela"	Valverde; Cadenas	Quintero	2:00
2.	"Frou Frou"	Chatau	Quintero	2:59

EP - HH 1752 - Side B
No.	Title	Writer(s)	Conductor / arrangement	Length
1.	"Agua que no has de beber"	Martínez Abades	García Segura	2:25
2.	"Cuore ingrato «Catarí»"	Cardillo; Cordiferro	Quintero	2:31

EP - HH 1753 - Side A
No.	Title	Writer(s)	Conductor / arrangement	Length
1.	"Mala entraña"	Martínez Abades	Quintero	2:18
2.	"Es mi hombre (Mon Homme) (Note: Version in Spanish with some phrases in French. Montiel also recorded the full version in French of the song which was released only in France on a later edition.)"	Yvain; Cadenas; Arozamena	Quintero	2:25

EP - HH 1753 - Side B
No.	Title	Writer(s)	Conductor / arrangement	Length
1.	"Tus ojitos negros"	Vivas; Barta	García Segura	2:33
2.	"Rosa de Madrid"	Soriano; Barta	Quintero	2:15

=== Reissues ===
The soundtrack has been reissued several times in different countries in vinyl, cassette and CD. In 2010 it was remastered and released in CD first and for music download later.

== Legacy ==
=== Tributes ===
On 25 January 1991, the Institute of Cinematography and Audiovisual Arts on behalf of the Ministry of Culture, the General Society of Authors of Spain, the Academy of Cinematographic Arts and Sciences of Spain and the Complutense University of Madrid, honored Montiel in recognition of her career at a gala at Cine Capitol in Madrid prior to the screening of The Violet Seller.

On 9 April 2013, the day after Montiel's death, as the funeral procession with her mortal remains passed through the Gran Vía on the way to the San Justo cemetery, The Violet Seller was projected on the giant screens at the façades of Cine Callao while people paid tribute to her as she passed by. On 11 July 2014, Correos, the Spanish postal service, issued a sheet of stamps in tribute to three recently deceased famous Spanish cinema artists: Sara Montiel, Alfredo Landa and Manolo Escobar. The stamp that pays tribute to Montiel depicts her in an image from The Violet Seller and the sheet of stamps shows a verse of "Es mi hombre".

=== In popular culture ===
On the sixth episode of the fourth season of Tu cara me suena aired on 23 October 2015 on Antena 3, flamenco singer Falete impersonated Montiel singing "Es mi hombre" replicating the scene from the film. On 17 October 2016, Fotogramas film magazine listed Soledad Moreno among the "twenty-five most elegant characters in Spanish cinema".
