= La Violetera =

Song
- Language: Spanish
- Released: 1914
- Genre: Cuplé
- Composer: José Padilla
- Lyricist: Eduardo Montesinos
- "La Violetera" Sample of Sara Montiel's cover of "La Violetera" from the 1958 film The Violet Seller

"La Violetera" is a 1914 cuplé song, with the rhythm of a habanera, composed by José Padilla and with lyrics by Eduardo Montesinos, originally performed by Carmen Flores. It was first popularized by Raquel Meller, and later by Sara Montiel. The instrumental version is also popular as a tango. In Spanish, a Violetera is a woman who sells violets.

== History ==
The song was composed in 1914 by José Padilla during his stay in Paris as director of the orchestra of the Casino de Paris music hall. The lyricist was Eduardo Montesinos. Its premiere took place in Barcelona with a performance by Carmen Flores. It was singer Raquel Meller who first popularized the song in Spain and France, and later worldwide.

Sung in French by Dalida, it was released in 1956 in the first high quality release of the song on vinyl. It was included on her 1956 EP La violetera / Le torrent / Gitane / Fado, which reached number 10 on the French charts, and remained there for 14 weeks. It was also included also on her first album Son nom est Dalida in 1957.

The 1958 blockbuster musical film The Violet Seller, by Luis César Amadori, was inspired by the song. The version of "La Violetera" performed by Sara Montiel in the film, with arrangement by composer Gregorio García Segura and recorded by Hispavox, also became worldwide famous. The film soundtrack was released in different vinyl editions in Spain, Italy, Portugal, France, Greece, Israel, Japan, Chile, Argentina, Colombia, Bolivia, Peru, Brazil, Mexico, Canada and the United States. It received a Gold Record award for its sales.

The song is also in the repertoire of singers such as Montserrat Caballé, Gigliola Cinquetti, Nana Mouskouri, Connie Francis and Mieczysław Fogg.

Other films using "La Violetera" in its soundtrack include City Lights (1931) by Charles Chaplin with himself and Virginia Cherrill; All Night Long (1981) by Jean-Claude Tramont with Barbra Streisand and Gene Hackman; Scent of a Woman (1992) by Martin Brest with Al Pacino and Chris O'Donnell; In the Mood for Love (2000) by Wong Kar Wai, named "Lan Hua Nu", recorded in 1949 and sung by Rebecca Pan; and Rajee En Kanmani (1954), named "Malligai Poo Jathi Rojaa", mixed with "La Paloma" and sung by R. Balasaraswathi Devi.

== Plagiarism and adaptations ==
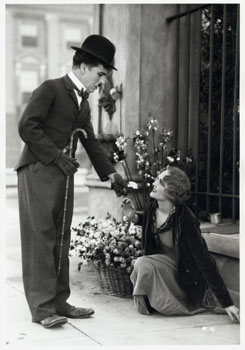
City Lights (1931), in which Chaplin used "La Violetera"

In 1926 Anselmo Aieta wrote a tango to lyrics by Francisco García Jiménez, where the refrain is a straight borrowing of "La Violetera"'s theme.

Among the most famous adaptations is the one by Charles Chaplin in his 1931 film City Lights. The main theme used as a leitmotif for the blind flower-seller is the song "La Violetera" ("Who'll Buy my Violets"). Chaplin was unable to secure the song performer, Raquel Meller, in the lead role, but used the song melody anyway as a major theme. In 1934, Chaplin lost a lawsuit to Padilla (which took place in Paris, where Padilla then lived) for not crediting him. Some modern editions released for video include a new recording by Carl Davis.

== Depictions ==
In 1966, a fountain commemorating singer Raquel Meller, portrayed as a violets seller, was unveiled in Barcelona. In 1991, a statue of a violets seller, named La Violetera, by sculptor Santiago de Santiago, commemorating composer José Padilla, was unveiled in Madrid. Since 2003, the statue has been located at Las Vistillas gardens in Madrid.

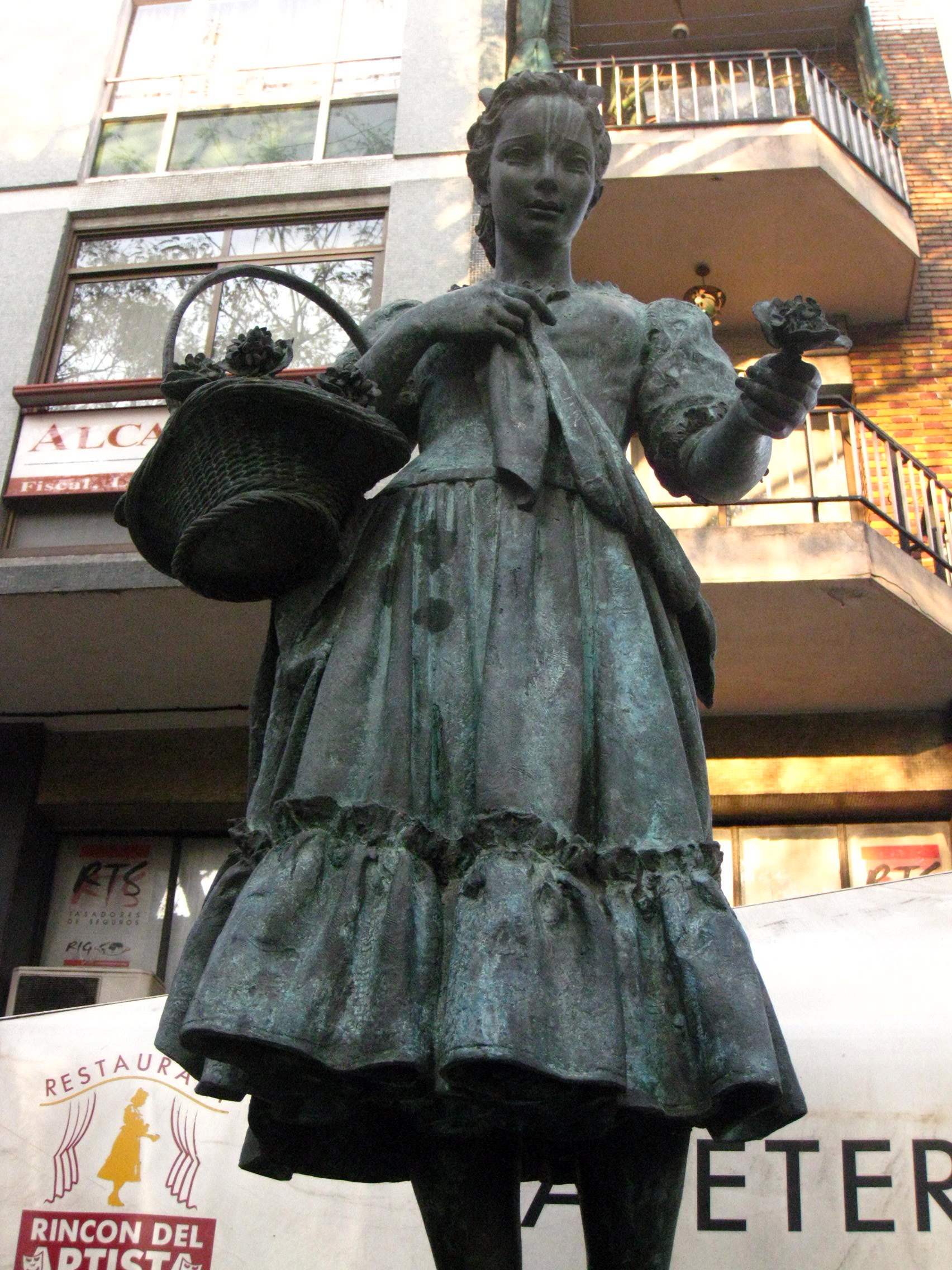
Raquel Meller fountain (1966), portrayed as a violets seller. Nou de la Rambla street, Barcelona.

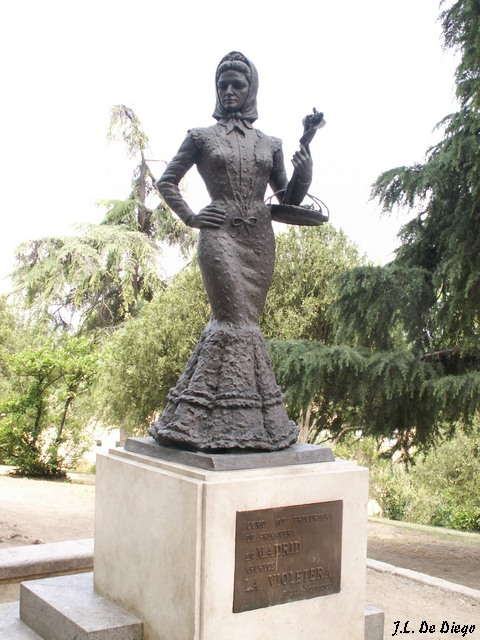
La Violetera (1991) by sculptor Santiago de Santiago. Las Vistillas gardens, Madrid.
