= I Get Ideas =

1951 popular song

Song
- Published: 1951 by Hill & Range
- Genre: Tango
- Songwriters: Composer: Julio César Sanders (1927); Lyricist: Dorcas Cochran (English 1951)

"I Get Ideas" is a popular song which has been recorded by various musicians and used in a number of films and television episodes.

== Origin ==
The music is a 1927 tango-canción (tango with lyrics) called "Adios, Muchachos", composed by Argentinian Julio César Sanders (often credited in the U.S. as "Lenny Sanders"). The English lyric (which has nothing to do with the original Spanish lyric by Cesar Felipe Vedani) is by Dorcas Cochran, and was published in 1951.

== Notable recordings ==
The most popular recording of the song was by Tony Martin, recorded on April 16, 1951, by RCA Victor and issued as catalog number 20-4141 in the 45 and 78 rpm formats. The record first appeared on the Billboard charts on May 25, 1951, lasting 30 weeks and peaking at number three.

The recording by Louis Armstrong was recorded on July 24, 1951, and released by Decca Records as catalog number 27720. It first reached the Billboard charts on August 24, 1951, and lasted 16 weeks on the chart, peaking at number 13. It was the flip side of "A Kiss to Build a Dream On".

The song was also recorded by Peggy Lee on May 16, 1951. It was released by Capitol Records as catalog number 1573.

Jane Morgan included the song on her album Jane in Spain (1959)

Bing Crosby and Rosemary Clooney recorded a duet of this song on December 2, 1964, with the Billy May Orchestra for their 1965 Capitol album That Travelin' Two-Beat.

== Television and film appearances ==
"I Get Ideas" is sung by Desi Arnaz as Ricky Ricardo in the 1952 I Love Lucy episode "The Publicity Agent", and Lucille Ball sings the song as Lucy Ricardo in the 1955 I Love Lucy episode "Lucy and the Dummy".

In a 1976 episode of The Muppet Show guest-starring Rita Moreno, she and a human-sized French Muppet perform an Apache Dance to the tune of "I Get Ideas".

As "Adios, Muchachos", the song is featured on the soundtracks of the 1992 movie Scent of a Woman and Woody Allen's 2006 movie Scoop.

The melody is used extensively in the 1944 movie Together Again starring Irene Dunne and Charles Boyer. The song is also used in the 1937 movie History is Made at Night starring Charles Boyer and Jean Arthur. The couple dances to it and refers to it as "our tango".

In the 1992 episode of Lovejoy entitled "Smoke Your Nose", the vicar plays an arrangement for church organ, prompting Lovejoy and Lady Jane to dance a tango spontaneously in the church aisle.

In 1997, it was used on the soundtrack of The Full Monty.

"I Get Ideas" also appears on the soundtrack to the 1998 film The Impostors. The recording is credited to Elizabeth Bracco & Lewis J. Stadlen with Gary DeMichele & Band. It was used in part to reference its use in 1939's Another Thin Man during a protracted comic set piece.

M. Ward recorded an upbeat version of "I Get Ideas" for his 2012 album A Wasteland Companion. Ward had been playing the song live for a couple of years prior to the release. This version was used in the second-season episode of Girls, also titled "I Get Ideas".

The song is featured in the 2021 film Cruella.
