= Valencia (song) =

Song by José Padilla
- Released: 1926
- Genre: Pasodoble
- Length: 2:03
- Songwriter: José Padilla

"Valencia" is a pasodoble song composed by José Padilla for the 1924 zarzuela La bien amada and included in the 1926 silent film Valencia, with lyrics translated by Lucien Boyer, Jacques Charles, and Clifford Grey. Recorded by Paul Whiteman & his Orchestra, it became one of the biggest hits of 1926.

== In popular culture ==
Other popular recordings in 1926 were by Ben Selvin & His Orchestra (vocals by Irving Kaufman), The Revelers, Ross Gorman, and Jesse Crawford. That year, Carlos Gardel recorded "Valencia" with different lyrics, as José Padilla frequently worked in Buenos Aires.

Tony Martin recorded the song in 1950, and his cover reached number 18 on the U.S. chart. It also appears in the El último cuplé (1957) soundtrack, sung by Sara Montiel, and in 1994 Montiel would perform this song live during the Valencia Fallas celebrations. The song appears on the Spanish the Shadows' EP Los Shadows, released in 1963. In 2008 it was included in Plácido Domingo's Because you're mine.

This march is considered the informal hymn of Valencia. It is especially loved in Valencia, as in March every year during the Fallas in Valencia the Valencia pasodoble is heard during the L'Ofrena de flors (the offering of flowers) to Our Lady of the Forsaken.

== Influences on literature ==
In the novel The Invention of Morel, the Argentinian writer Adolfo Bioy Casares often quotes this song, together with "Tea for Two". The main character is alone, in a wild island, when he starts to hear this unexpected music. In the plot the song stands for the lightheartedness of the high society, that somehow violates the wild space of a lonely island, where the main character is literally "struggling for survival".

The saxophonist Pablo in Hermann Hesse's novel Steppenwolf mentions this song as an example of melodies quietly reproduced every night by dreamy people.
