= Blanquita Suárez =

Spanish singer and actress

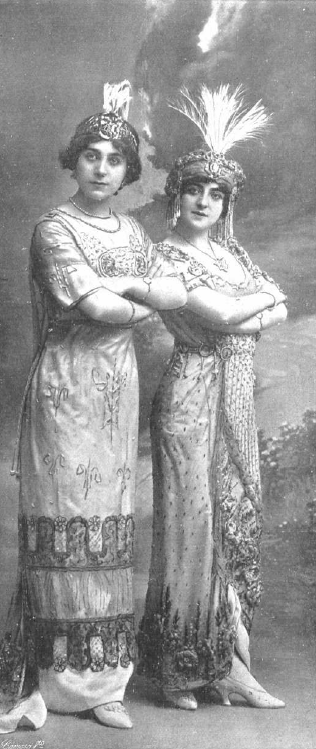
Blanquita (left) with her sister Cándida, 1913

Blanquita Suárez (1894 - 1983) was a Spanish singer and actress. She was the subject of several drawings and an oil painting by Picasso.

== Life and career ==
Suárez was born in San Sebastián to family that had been in show business for several generations. Her father was a baritone singer and her mother sang in a zarzuela chorus. Her grandfather was a prompter at the Apolo Theatre and her younger sister, Cándida Suárez, was a well-known soprano whose career was at its height the 1930s and 1940s.

She began her stage career at the age of 12 when she appeared in Puerto de la Luz. She worked as a cabaret singer as well as performing in revues, operettas, and comic zarzuelas. Rafael Adam Baiges (1886 – 1952) composed "El fado Blanquita" in 1918 expressly for her. Later in her life, she appeared in character roles in films.

Picasso may have first seen her as possible model for his paintings when she was performing in the theatres and cabarets of Barcelona which he frequented at the time. His sketches of her are conserved in the Picasso Museum in Paris and his 1917 oil painting of her is held in the Picasso Museum in Barcelona.

She had a daughter, Teresa Mora, out of wedlock on April 5, 1928. Teresa Mora was raised by her father Juan Mora in Barcelona, Spain. She showed a talent for singing at an early age and began singing professionally at the age of thirteen, went on to become an international singer through the 1940s and 1950s, and moved to the US in 1960.

== Stage performances ==
- El sobre verde with the song "Soy garçon, çon, çon… con el pelo cortao"
- La Blanca with the song "Moreno tiene que ser"
- Suspiros de España with the song "Ojos verdes"

== Filmography ==
- Aventura, by Jerónimo Mihura (1942)
- Rojo y negro, by Carlos Arévalo (1942)
- The Violet Seller, by Luis César Amadori (1958)
- La verdad (1917)
- La chica del gato (1943)
- Fútbol, amor y toros (1929)
- ¡Che, qué loco! (1953)
- El Bandido generoso (1954)
- Fray Escoba (1961)
