= Museo del Traje =

Clothing museum and research center in Madrid, Spain

Museum of Garment - Ethnological Heritage Research Center
- Museo del Traje - Centro de Investigación del Patrimonio Etnológico
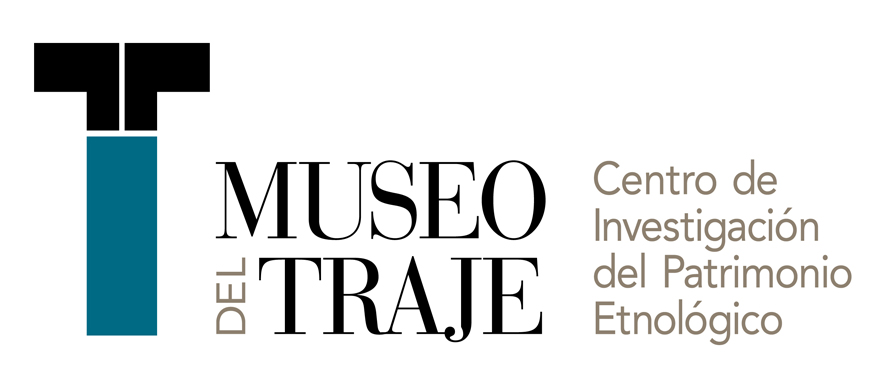

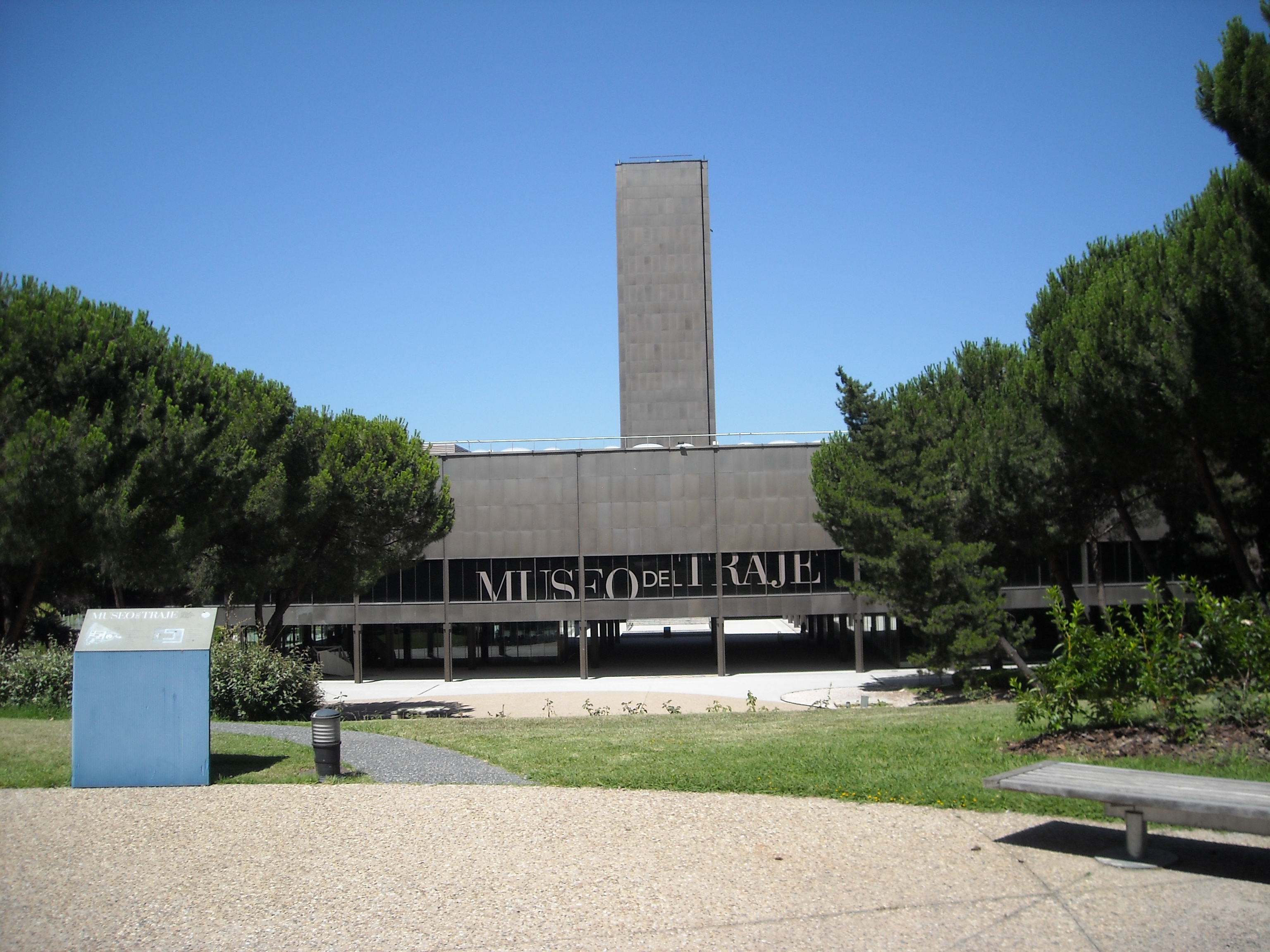
- Location: Madrid, Spain
- Coordinates: 40.44°N 3.728611°W
- Public transit access: Moncloa; Ciudad Universitaria
- Website: museodeltraje.mcu.es

History
- Built: 1973

Site notes
- Architect: Jaime López de Asiaín
- Architectural style: Modernist

Spanish Cultural Heritage
- Official name: Museo del Traje - Centro de Investigación del Patrimonio Etnológico
- Type: Non-movable
- Criteria: Monument
- Designated: 1962
- Reference no.: RI-51-0001379

The Museum of Garment - Ethnological Heritage Research Center (Spanish: Museo del Traje - Centro de Investigación del Patrimonio Etnológico) is a museum and ethnology heritage research center in Madrid, Spain, devoted to promote, disseminate, value, and improve knowledge about the historical evolution of clothing and fashion. It is one of the National Museums of Spain and it is attached to the Ministry of Culture.

The museum has over 160,000 pieces and documents. The current building was completed in 1973. Collections date from the Middle Ages up to clothes by Spain's contemporary fashion designers.

== History ==
The current Museo del Traje dates from 2004. The museum, despite being a newly created institution, has a long and curious history. Its origin lies in the Historic Costume Exhibition, held in 1925. In the keynote address at this event, the Count of Romanones raised the idea of making the temporary exhibition permanent. Two years later he created a Board of Trustees of the Museum who would take charge of the funds of the exhibition, receiving them from the state, and form them into the new Regional Costume Museum and History (1927–1934).

In 1934, the Count creates the idea of creating another institution to pick up these treasured collections and also the traditions of the Spanish People. This new museum, the Museum of the Spanish Village, acquired the collections of Ethnography and Folk Art at the School of Education, and contained an extensive series of objects that the Regional Trustees acquired between 1934 and 1936. After several changes of venue the collections were moved in 1983 into the building then occupied by the Spanish Museum of Contemporary Art Museo Español de Arte Contemporáneo. In 1993 the Museum of the Spanish Village and the National Museum of Ethnology are united in a single institution, the National Museum of Anthropology (1993–2004). However, both continued to operate independently.

Finally, in 2002, after a general discussion on the future of the museum, it was decided to enhance the public presence of the collection of costumes, from a modern perspective.

== Building ==
The architect, Jaime López de Asiaín, was awarded the National Prize for Architecture in 1969 for this project, construction beginning in 1971. The building was completed in 1973 and inaugurated in 1975. The building was built as the home of the Spanish Museum of Contemporary Art (MEAC), later to become the Museo Nacional Centro de Arte Reina Sofía. After the MEAC left the building in 1992 the building lay unused. A restoration of the building was carried out at a cost of 21 million euro in 2005, allowing the building to become the home of the Museo del Traje. The building takes to form of a tower set upon a large horizontal element containing the museum section. All are elevated above the surrounding landscape allowing visitors to walk beneath the building into a shaded courtyard containing a large monumental staircase. Several glass pavilions are set between the ground and the building above.

== Gallery ==
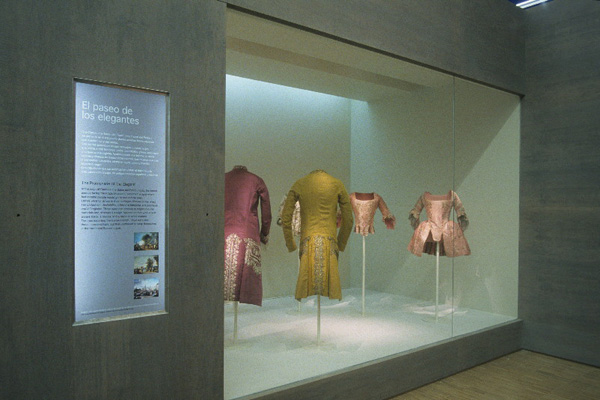
Exhibition Hall

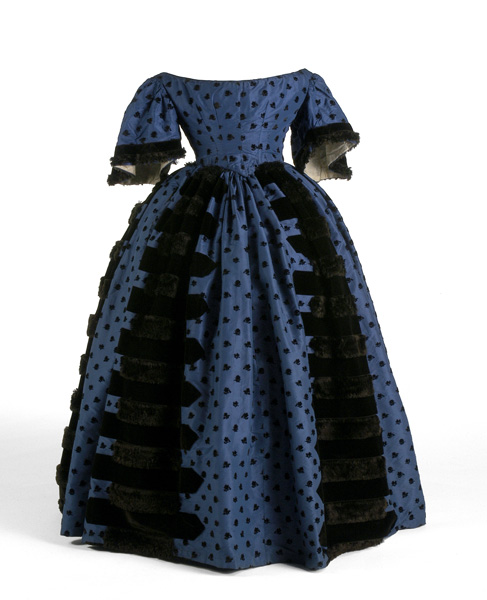
Ballgown. c. 1850-1858

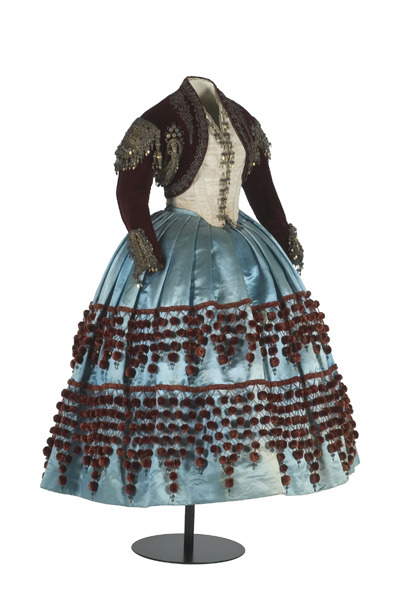
Maja dress. Owned by Infanta Isabella. 1858.

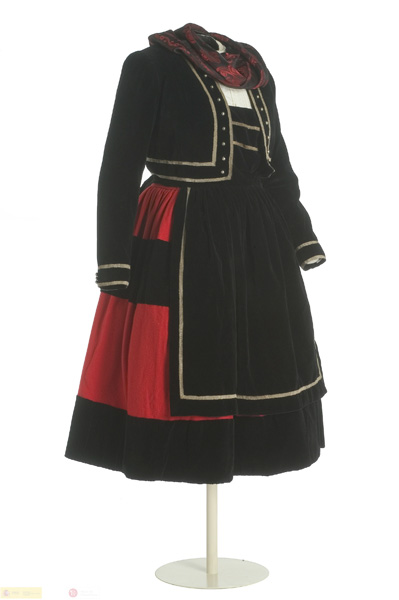
Traditional dress from the Pas Valley. c. 1900-1950.

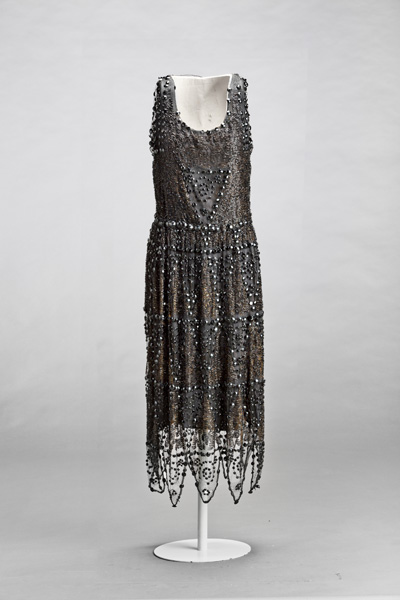
Dress. Madeleine Vionnet. c. 1921-1930.

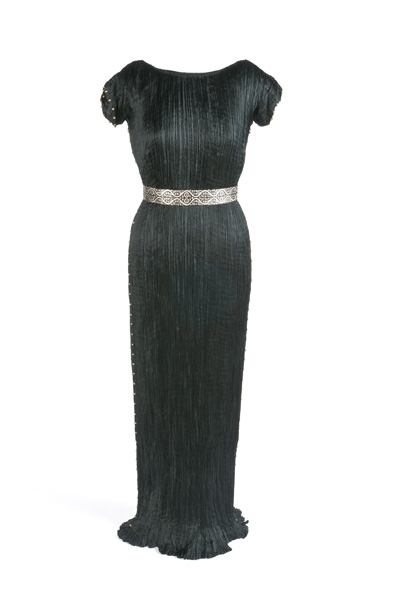
Delphos gown. Mariano Fortuny. c. 1921-1950.

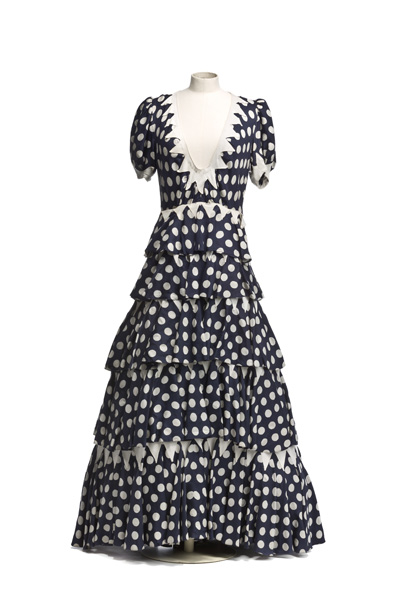
Evening dress. Ana de Pombo for Paquin. c. 1939

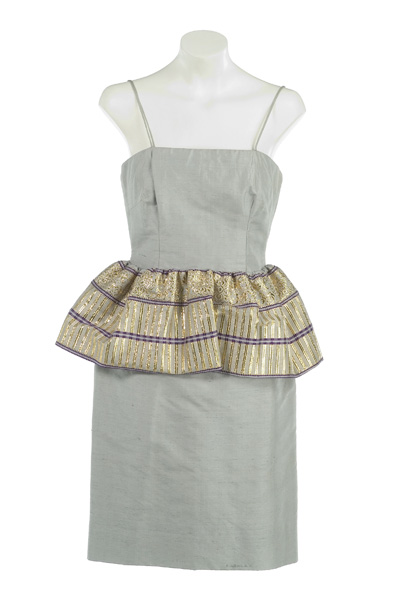
Cocktail dress. Vargas Ochagavía. c. 1960

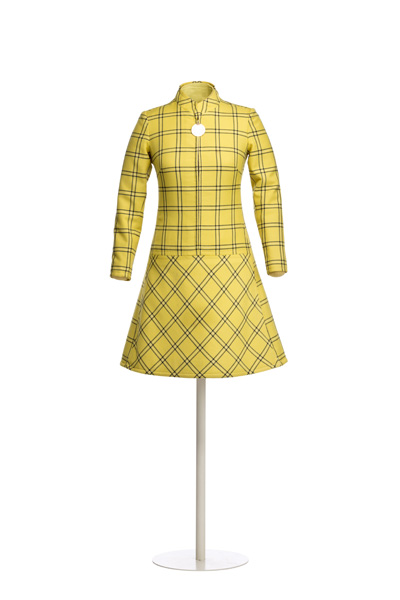
Wool minidress. Herrera y Ollero. c. 1962-1967
