= Vargas Ochagavía =

Spanish couturier

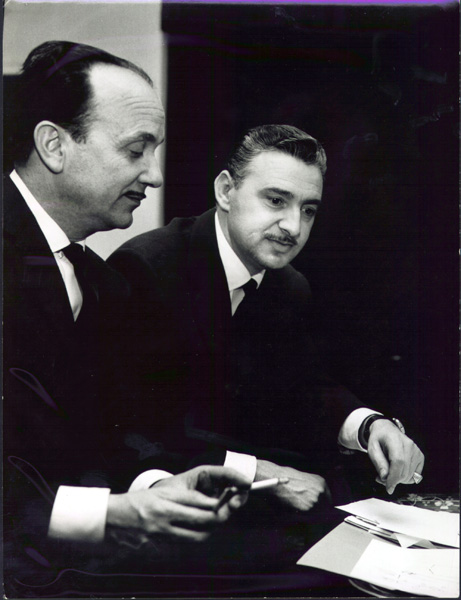
- Jesús Vargas and Emilio Ochagavía
- Industry: Fashion
- Founded: 1946; 80 years ago
- Founders: Jesús Vargas; Emilio Ochagavía
- Defunct: 1987
- Headquarters: Madrid, Spain

Vargas Ochagavía was a Spanish haute couture firm made up by couturiers Jesús Vargas (1913-n.a.) and Emilio Ochagavía (1922-1996). The firm opened in 1946, presented its first collection in 1948 and was running until 1987. It was a member of the Cooperativa de Alta Costura until 1970.

Their garments were dressed by actresses such as Sara Montiel, Celia Gámez, Carmen Sevilla, Paquita Rico and Sophia Loren and socialites like Fabiola de Mora y Aragón.

They also worked for films such as Death of a Cyclist (1955), The Violet Seller (1958), Where Are You Going, Alfonso XII? (1958), Cabriola (1965), Más bonita que ninguna (1965) and Esa mujer (1969).

== Gallery ==
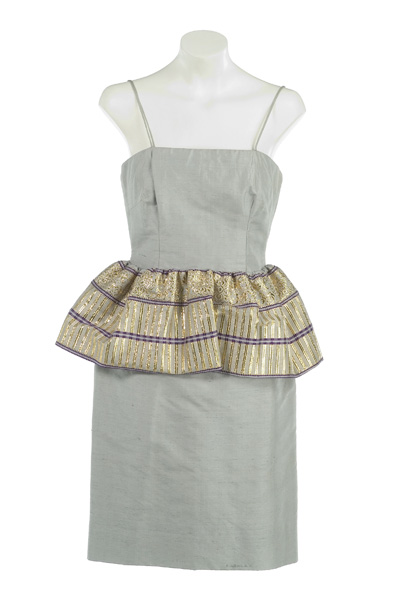
Cocktail dress. Museum of Garment. c. 1960
