= Adiós muchachos (song) =

1927 Argentine tango song

Song
- Language: Spanish
- Published: 1927
- Recorded: June 26, 1928
- Genre: Tango
- Length: 2:30
- Label: EMI-Odeon, Victor
- Composer: Julio César Sanders
- Lyricist: César Vedani

Adiós muchachos is a 1927 Argentine tango song composed by Argentinian pianist Julio César Sanders and Argentinian poet César Vedani.

== Origin ==
According to Francisco Garcia Jimenez, Sanders was inspired when after a night out with a group of friends in 1927 in the Buenos Aires district of Flores, one of them said goodbye with the words "Adiós, muchachos". Sanders then developed it further with his piano and his friend Vedani adapted a "little text" to the incidentally conceived music ("afortunada música").

Walter Ercoli wrote that Vedani was sitting at a table in the cafe "Orchids" in the Flores neighborhood developing the verses of the tango and Julio Cesar Sanders played the melody on a piano in a place that formerly used pianos.

== Lyrics ==
The original lyrics have the protagonist, who is close to death from an illness, say goodbye to his friends, while reminiscing on aspects of his life. The original lyrics have been published as follows. In other publications the first block of verse is repeated again at the end.

Adiós, muchachos, compañeros de mi vida,
barra querida de aquellos tiempos.
Me toca a mí hoy emprender la retirada,
debo alejarme de mi buena muchachada.
Adiós, muchachos. Ya me voy y me resigno...
Contra el destino nadie la talla...
Se terminaron para mí todas las farras,
mi cuerpo enfermo no resiste más...

Acuden a mi mente recuerdos de otros tiempos,
de los bellos momentos que antaño disfruté
cerquita de mi madre, santa viejita,
y de mi noviecita que tanto idolatré...

¿Se acuerdan que era hermosa, más bella que una diosa
y que ebrio yo de amor, le di mi corazón,
mas el Señor, celoso de sus encantos,
hundiéndome en el llanto me la llevó?

Es Dios el juez supremo. No hay quien se le resista.
Ya estoy acostumbrado su ley a respetar,
pues mi vida deshizo con sus mandatos
al robarme a mi madre y a mi novia también.

Dos lágrimas sinceras derramo en mi partida
por la barra querida que nunca me olvidó
y al darles, mis amigos, mi adiós postrero,
les doy con toda mi alma mi bendición...

=== Cultural repression of lyrics ===
After the 1943 Argentine coup d'état the military dictatorship began a campaign forcing to suppress lunfardo, slang language, any references to intoxication or other expressions that were arbitrarily considered immoral, "negative for the language" or the country. For the tango recording by the orchestra of Enrique Rodríguez in April 1945 three changes were ordered: la barra querida (beloved gang) had to become viejos amigos (old friends), nadie la talla' (no one size fits all) became nadie batalla (no battle) and todas las farras (all those binges) became todas las fiestas (all those parties).

The restrictions were taken over during the administration of General Perón, and in 1949 executives of the Sociedad Argentina de Autores y Compositores de Música (SADAIC) asked the administrator of mail and telecommunications in an interview that they be annulled, but to no avail. They spoke with Peron and the President on March 25, 1949, who said that no such directive existed, which left them effectless.

In October 1953, the Broadcasting Act No. 14241 was approved and although it had no provisions regarding the use of popular language in radio, restrictions continued to some extent. This led to SADAIC complaint in January 1950 to eradicate certain items by Radio El Mundo; Despite the complaint, in 1952 the institution itself and the authors had agreed with the authorities on a list of popular songs that should not be passed as idiomatic radio for reasons of taste and decency; in short, SADAIC did not question censorship but had exercised it.

== Recordings ==
As of April 2016 a tango database lists 118 distinct recordings of the tango. The tango was first recorded in the summer of 1927 by Agustín Magaldi with guitar accompaniment. On February 27, 1928 Ignacio Corsini recorded it accompanied by guitars. A version sung by Carlos Gardel recorded 26 June 1928 accompanied by Barbieri y Ricardo in Buenos Aires for EMI-Odeon 18245 2831/1 became a hit during the second half of 1928, when the composers traveled to Europe including Paris and Barcelona where they promoted the tango in different publishing houses and European record labels. Hugo del Carril recorded it in 1946 accompanied by guitars. Francisco Lomuto recorded it for Victor in 1942 with singer Jorge Omar. Odeón recorded the tango with the voice of Armando Moreno and music by Enrique Rodríguez. On May 19, 1950, Julio Martel sang the tune with the orchestra Alfredo De Angelis for Buenos Aires label Odeon 55104-B 17660. An instrumental version from 12 May 1961 with the orchestra of José Basso was made by Buenos Aires EMI-Odeon LDS-818 26337 and Buenos Aires Almalí 30007.

Other recordings include Horacio Deval with the orchestra of Roberto Pansera and Atilio Stampone in 1961 with Hector Petray. On 8 November 1973 a recording sung by Carlos Gardel with the José Basso orchestra was produced by Buenos Aires EMI-Odeon 8015-B 41005.

An instrumental version of the song was recorded by The Shadows on their 1963 EP Los Shadows with the title, Adios muchachos (Pablo the Dreamer) and by Italian accordionist Edoardo Lucchina on his 1963 LP Tanghi (Tangos) (durium, ms M 300/007).

== Filmography ==
=== Movies ===
The tango was included in Wonder Bar, the 1934 US movie directed by Lloyd Bacon performed in a cabaret on Montmartre. It appeared in the 1935 short film Freddie Martin & His Orchestra (1935). It also appeared in two films of French actor Charles Boyer, the History Is Made at Night played by a band at Cesare's, danced by Boyer and Jean Arthur who refer to it as "our tango" and reprised from a record on the ship to Paris; it is used as leitmotif throughout the 1944 comedy Together Again, the 1939 movie Another Thin Man at the West Indies Club, danced by Myrna Loy and Rafael Storm and other couples, and the 1940 movie City for Conquest played at the Lower East Side dance. In the 1960 film Innocent Sorcerers, the Polish version of the song was sung as Tadeusz Łomnicki's bandmates (including Roman Polanski) were saying goodbye to him.

It was included in the soundtrack of the 1992 Scent of a Woman as performed by The Tango project, in the 1997 movie The Full Monty with a version credited in the trailer section as being from 1940, in the 1997 Finnish drama Vääpeli Körmy ja kahtesti laukeava performed by Jorma Aalto, Jari Lappalainen and Heikki Virtanen, in the Macedonian comedy science fiction Goodbye, 20th Century (Zbogum na dvaesetiot vek 1998), and the Woody Allen movie Scoop (2006 film).

=== Television ===
On television, the tango was sung in 1952 by Desi Arnaz with the lyrics of Dorcas Cochran in episode 31 of I Love Lucy, in 1955 by Lucille Ball in episode 130 of the same series and in the 1995 miniseries Alys Robi episode 1.2. The Muppet Show episode 1.02 (of 12 September 1976), features an Apache Dance parody between Rita Moreno and a stereotypically "French looking" human sized muppet to the tune of Adios, Muchachos. Used as the music in the final episode of the Lovejoy TV series (Series 6, episode 10), Last Tango in Lavenham (1994) when Lovejoy (Ian McShane) and Lady Jane Felsham (Phyllis Logan) dance the tango.

== Yetas (supersitions) ==
It is considered bad luck to dance to the tango “Adiós Muchachos”. This superstition arose from the false belief that Carlos Gardel sang this song before the plane crash that killed him.

== Versions ==
=== Titles ===
Numerous songs have been registered with SADAIC under Adiós muchachos; The following song titles are listed under the original registration by Sanders and Vedani from 20 November 1935:

- Adiós muchachos
- Adiós amigos
- Adieu
- Adieu París
- El Pablo el soñador
- Pablo The Dreamer
- Farewell Boys
- I Get Ideas
- I'll Keep you in my Heart
- Ik heb n Coca-Cola
- Tango Medley
- Marianne
- Me revoici
- Twee donk re ogen
- Von gestern abend bis he
- Zwei rote Lippen und ein roter Tarragona
- Adiós muchachos-Sanders-Vedani
- Pablo el soñador El-Sanders
- Efsane ask
- Biet Khuc Cho Tinh Nhan

=== Other languages ===
An early German version Zwei rote Lippen und ein roter Tarragona with new, unrelated lyrics originates from 1929. It was recorded by Tango-Kapelle Morello in 1929, naming Friedrich Schwarz as the author of the lyrics, and by Helge Roswaenge in 1930, naming the authors as "Musik: Christian Sanders - Text: Hartwig von Platen, Friedrich Schwarz". Schwarz' lyrics describe drinking wine from Tarragona in Barcelona. That version is still popular in Germany under both German and Spanish titles, with references in other media, e.g. Christoph Hein's short novel Der Tangospieler (The Tango Player, 1989) wherein the main character is imprisoned in the East Germany in 1968 for performing the tango as a pianist.

Louis Armstrong made his own version of the tango with the title I Get Ideas recorded on July 24, 1951, featuring Dorcas Cochran as the author of the lyrics. In Great Britain two versions exist titled I'll always keep you in my heart and Paul the dreamer. Recorded in 1931 under the title I’ll Keep You in my Heart Always by Al Bowlly with Jack Leon and His Band. Reissued by Saville Records on mono vinyl LP Goodnight Sweetheart - Al Bowlly - 1931 Sessions (SVL 150) In the United States there is a version by the name of Farewell companions (Goodbye companions) attempting a translation of the original lyrics.

In Italy, a version belonging to Eugenio Rondinella retained the title words in the original language, but is otherwise very different as it relates to a man who will be imprisoned for one year.

Another Italian version, recorded by Milva, retained the original title words as well; the lyrics are intended to be sung by a female singer and they are the farewell of the performer to her friends before her imprisonment.

== Reception ==
José Gobello wrote that "it is the tango with the most phonographic versions globally and a quite catchy melody (though not matching the poignancy of the verses), but it does not seem to sufficiently explain the melodious sighs of acceptance by a diehard tango-ist."
