= Julio César Sanders =

Argentinian musician

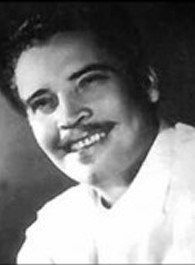

Background information
- Born: February 13, 1897; Quilmes, Argentina
- Died: June 10, 1942 (aged 45) Quilmes, Argentina
- Genres: tango
- Occupation: musician
- Instrument: piano
- Years active: 1920–1942

Julio César Sanders (1897–1942) was an Argentine musician who made his career as a pianist and composer of tango. He was the author of several famous tangos, including "Adiós muchachos", composed in 1927 with César Vedani.

== Biography ==
He was born in Quilmes, Buenos Aires Province, the son of Francisco Alberto Sanders and Paula del Valle, belonging to an Anglo Creole family. He began his career as a pianist of the Argentine radio by 1920. His first work as an author was "La Inglesita", composed in 1924. He was also the author of "Viejo patio", and "El Piano de los recuerdos", with lyrics of Enrique Cadícamo.

His most well-known work, "Adiós muchachos", was recorded by Carlos Gardel, Ignacio Corsini and Agustín Magaldi. It also was included in Wonder Bar, a 1934 film directed by Lloyd Bacon.

His paternal grandparents were Makinson William Sanders, born in England, and Anne Chartres, a piano teacher born in Ireland. The Sanderses settled with their children in the "English" neighborhood of Quilmes towards the end of the 1880s.
