= Jean-Claude Tramont =

Belgian director

Jean-Claude Tramont (May 5, 1930 - December 27, 1996) was a Belgian writer, producer and director best known for his marriage to famous Hollywood agent Sue Mengers and the film All Night Long (1981).

== Select Credits ==
- Ash Wednesday (1973) - writer
- Focal Point (1977) - director, writer
- All Night Long (1981) - director
- As Summers Die (1986) (TV movie) - director
