= City Lights =

1931 American silent film

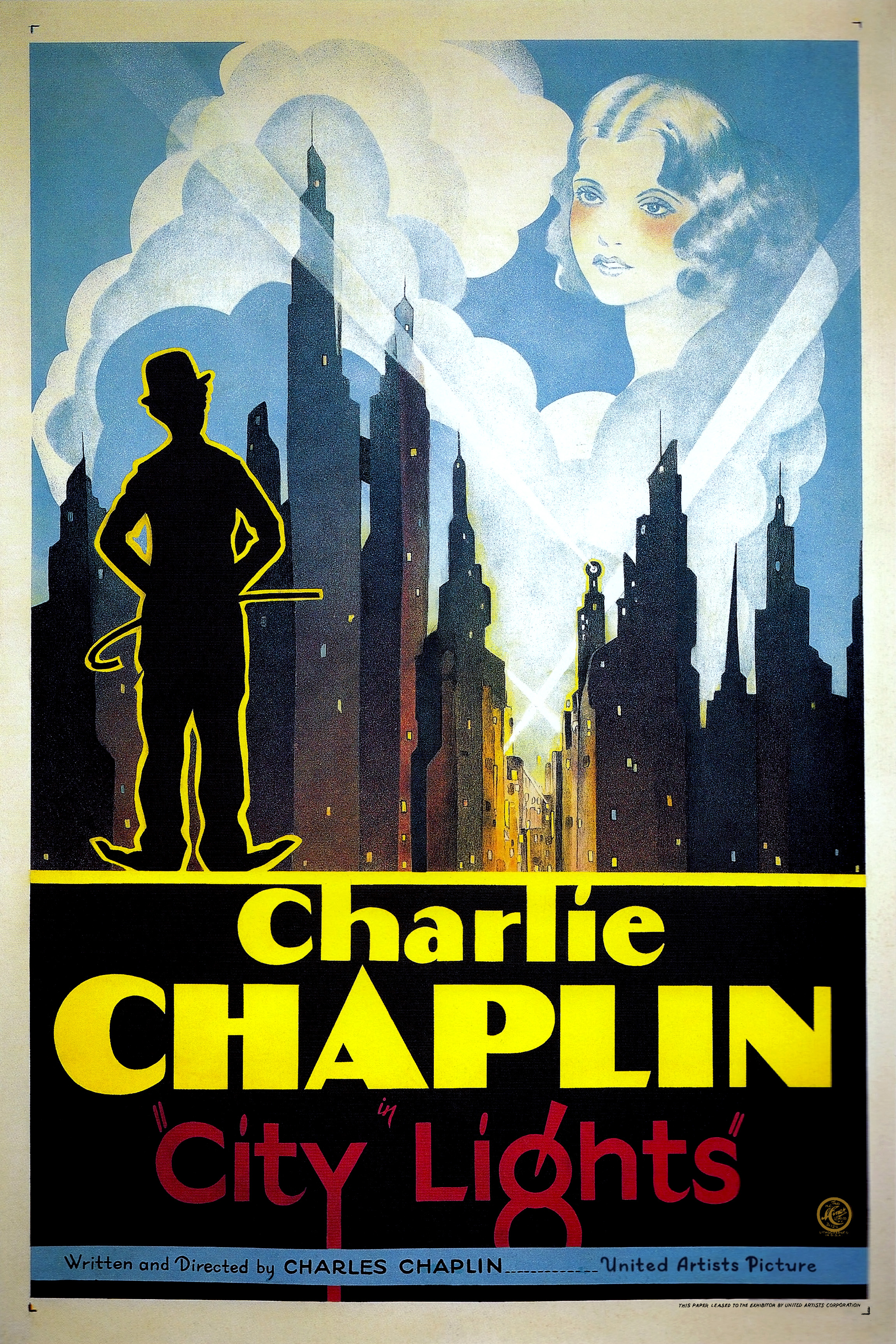
- Theatrical release poster by Hap Hadley
- Directed by: Charlie Chaplin
- Written by: Charlie Chaplin
- Produced by: Charlie Chaplin
- Starring: Charlie Chaplin; Virginia Cherrill; Florence Lee; Harry Myers; Al Ernest Garcia
- Cinematography: Roland Totheroh; Gordon Pollock
- Edited by: Charlie Chaplin; Willard Nico
- Music by: Charlie Chaplin; Flower Girl's theme by José Padilla; Orchestrated by Arthur Johnston and Alfred Newman
- Distributed by: United Artists
- Release dates: January 30, 1931 (Los Angeles, premiere); March 7, 1931 (USA)
- Running time: 87 minutes
- Country: United States
- Languages: Synchronized Sound; English Intertitles
- Budget: $1.5 million
- Box office: $4.25 million (worldwide rentals)

City Lights is a 1931 American synchronized sound romantic comedy-drama film written, produced, directed by, and starring Charlie Chaplin. While the film has no audible dialog, it was released with a synchronized musical score with sound effects. The story follows the misadventures of Chaplin's Tramp as he falls in love with a blind woman (Virginia Cherrill) and develops a turbulent friendship with an alcoholic millionaire (Harry Myers).

Although talking pictures (or films with recorded dialogue) were on the rise when Chaplin started developing the script in 1928, he decided to continue working without dialogue only incorporating sound with the use of a synchronized musical score with sound effects. Filming started on December 27, 1928 and ended in September 1930. City Lights marked the first time Chaplin composed the film score to one of his productions and it was written in six weeks with Arthur Johnston. The main theme, used as a leitmotif for the blind flower girl, is the song "La Violetera" ("Who'll Buy my Violets") from Spanish composer José Padilla. Chaplin lost a lawsuit to Padilla for not crediting him.

City Lights was immediately successful upon release on March 7, 1931, with positive reviews and worldwide rentals of more than $4 million. Today, many critics consider it not only the highest accomplishment of Chaplin's career, but one of the greatest films of all time. Chaplin biographer Jeffrey Vance believes "City Lights is not only Charles Chaplin's masterpiece; it is an act of defiance" as it premiered four years into the era of sound films which began with the premiere of The Jazz Singer (1927). In 1949, the critic James Agee called the film's final scene "the greatest single piece of acting ever committed to celluloid". In 1991, the Library of Congress selected City Lights for preservation in the United States National Film Registry as being "culturally, historically, or aesthetically significant". In 2007, the American Film Institute ranked it 11th on its list of the best American films ever made. As a published work from 1931, City Lights will enter the American public domain on January 1, 2027.

== Plot ==
The unveiling of a new monument to "Peace and Prosperity" reveals the Little Tramp asleep in the lap of one of the sculpted figures. He escapes the assembly's fury and roams the city. The Tramp encounters a flower girl on a street corner. He is instantly smitten and realizes she is blind while buying a flower from her. The woman mistakes him for a wealthy man when the door of an automobile slams shut as he departs. That evening, the Tramp saves a drunken millionaire from suicide. The millionaire takes the Tramp, his new best friend, back to his mansion for champagne, then to a party.

After helping the millionaire home the next morning, he sees the flower girl en route to her street corner. He gets some money from the millionaire, buys all her flowers and drives her home in the millionaire's car. After the Tramp leaves, the flower girl tells her grandmother about her kind, wealthy friend. Meanwhile, the Tramp returns to the mansion, where the millionaire – now sober – does not remember him and throws him out. Later that day, the millionaire is once again intoxicated and, seeing the Tramp on the street, invites him home for a lavish party. However, the millionaire is sober again the next morning and again kicks the Tramp out.

Finding that the woman is not at her usual corner, the Tramp goes to her apartment and overhears a doctor telling the grandmother that she has a fever. Determined to help, the Tramp takes a job as a street sweeper. On his lunch break, he brings her groceries. To entertain her, he reads a newspaper aloud, including a story about a Viennese doctor's blindness cure. "Wonderful, then I'll be able to see you," says the woman. He also finds an eviction notice the woman's grandmother has hidden. As he leaves, he pledges to pay the rent. However, he is fired for frequently being late.

A boxer convinces him to fight in a fixed match and split the prize money. However, the boxer is replaced at the last minute by a no-nonsense fighter who knocks the Tramp out despite the Tramp's nimble evasions. The Tramp encounters the drunken millionaire again and is invited to the mansion. He relates the flower girl's plight and receives money for her operation. Burglars knock the millionaire out and take the rest of his money. The police find the Tramp with the money given to him by the millionaire, who, because of the knock on the head, does not remember donating it. The Tramp evades the police long enough to give the money to the flower girl, telling her he will be going away for a time; he is arrested and imprisoned.

When the Tramp is released months later, he goes to the flower girl's customary street corner but does not find her. The woman – her sight restored – now runs a flower shop with her grandmother. However, she still thinks about her mysterious benefactor, and briefly mistakes a wealthy customer for him. The Tramp happens by the shop, where the woman is arranging flowers in the window. She watches him get taunted by newspaper boys. He stoops to pick up a discarded flower and turns to the shop's window. He suddenly sees the woman, who has been watching him. At the sight of her, he momentarily freezes, but then breaks into a broad smile.

The woman giggles to her employee, "I've made a conquest!" She offers him a fresh flower and a coin. Embarrassed, the Tramp begins to shuffle away, but the woman again offers the flower, which the Tramp shyly accepts. She takes his hand and presses the coin into it, then abruptly stops. She runs her fingers along his arm and shoulder, then gasps, "You?" The Tramp nods and asks, "You can see now?" She replies, "Yes, I can see now", and presses his hand to her heart with a tearful smile. As the film fades, the Tramp smiles back.

== Cast ==
- Virginia Cherrill as the blind girl
- Florence Lee as her grandmother
- Harry Myers as the eccentric millionaire
- Al Ernest Garcia as his butler (credited as Allan Garcia)
- Hank Mann as the prizefighter
- Charlie Chaplin as The Tramp

Uncredited cast

- Robert Parrish as a newsboy
- Henry Bergman as The Mayor and the blind girl's downstairs neighbor
- Eddie Baker as a boxing match referee
- Albert Austin as a street sweeper and a burglar
- Jean Harlow as an extra in nightclub scene (footage cut from the final film)

== Production ==
=== Pre-production ===
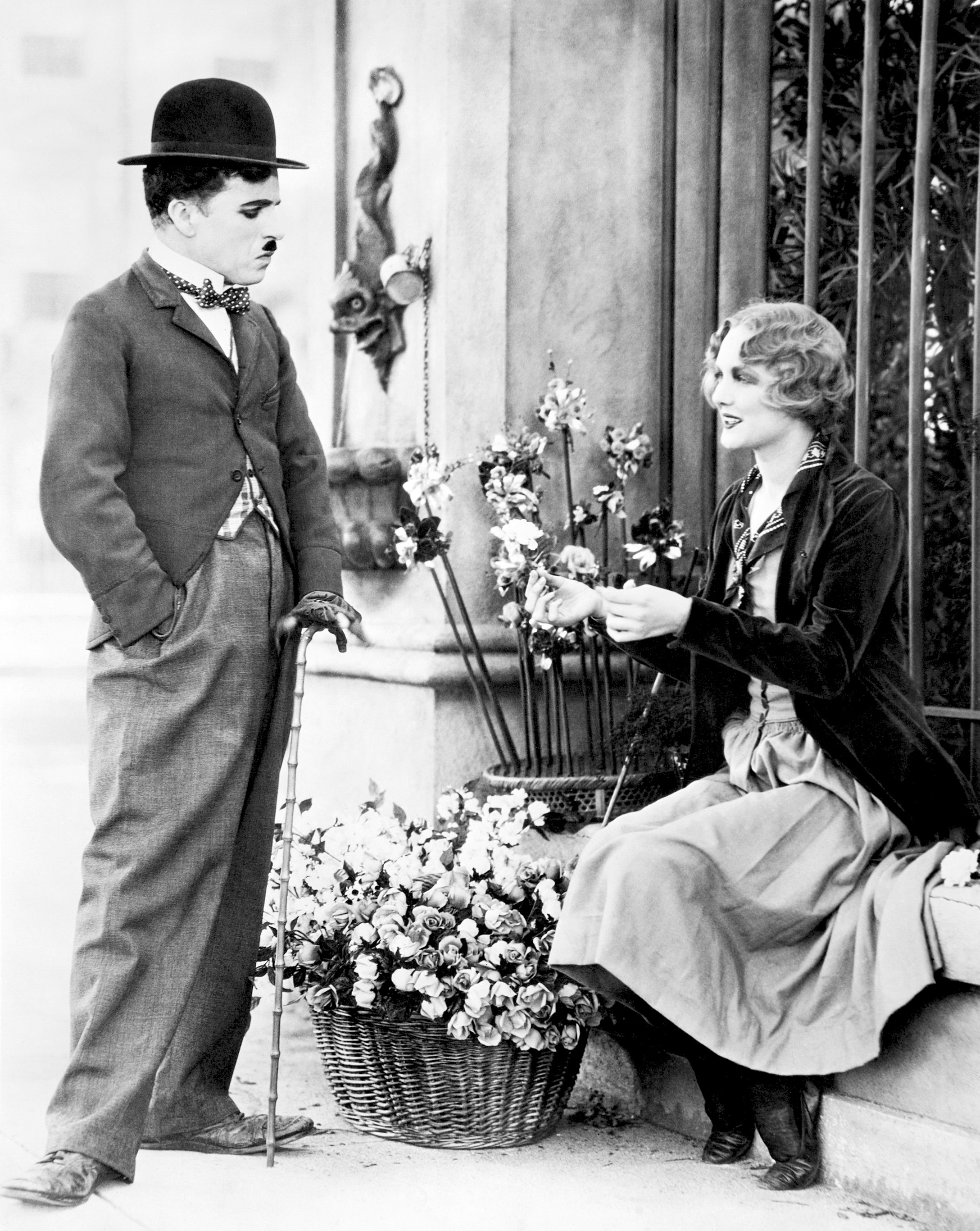
The Tramp meets the Blind Flower Girl and falls in love.

Chaplin's feature The Circus, released in 1928, was his last film before the motion picture industry embraced sound recording and brought the silent movie era to a close. As his own producer and distributor (part owner of United Artists), Chaplin could still conceive City Lights as a silent film. Technically the film was a crossover, as its soundtrack had synchronized music and sound effects but no spoken dialogue. The dialogue was presented on intertitles. Chaplin was first contacted by inventor Eugene Augustin Lauste in 1918 about making a sound film, but he never ended up meeting with Lauste. Chaplin was dismissive about "talkies" and told a reporter that he would "give the talkies three years, that's all." He was also concerned about how to adjust the Little Tramp to sound films.

In early 1928, Chaplin began writing the script with Harry Carr. The plot gradually grew from an initial concept Chaplin had considered after the success of The Circus, where a circus clown goes blind and has to conceal his handicap from his young daughter by pretending that his inability to see is an on-going series of pratfalls. This inspired the Blind Girl. The first scenes Chaplin thought up were of the ending, where the newly cured blind girl sees the Little Tramp for the first time. A highly detailed description of the scene was written, as Chaplin considered it to be the center of the entire film.

For a subplot, Chaplin first considered a character even lower on the social scale, a black newsboy. Eventually he opted for a drunken millionaire, a character previously used in the 1921 short The Idle Class. The millionaire plot was based on an old idea Chaplin had for a short in which two millionaires pick up the Little Tramp from the city dump and show him a good time in expensive clubs before dropping him back off at the dump, so when he woke up, the Tramp would not know if it was real or a dream. This was rewritten into a millionaire who is the Tramp's friend when drunk but does not recognize him when sober.

Chaplin officially began pre-production of the film in May 1928 and hired Australian art director Henry Clive to design the sets that summer. Chaplin eventually cast Clive in the role of the millionaire. Although the film was originally set in Paris, the art direction is inspired by a mix of several cities. Robert Sherwood said that "it is a weird city, with confusing resemblances to London, Los Angeles, Naples, Paris, Tangiers and Council Bluffs. It is no city on earth and it is all cities."

On August 28, 1928, Chaplin's mother Hannah Chaplin died at the age of 63. Chaplin was distraught for several weeks and pre-production did not resume until mid fall of 1928. Psychologist Stephen Weissman has hypothesized that City Lights is highly autobiographical, with the blind girl representing Chaplin's mother, while the drunken millionaire represents Chaplin's father. Weissman also compared many of the film's sets with locations from Chaplin's real childhood, such as the statue in the opening scene resembling St. Mark's Church on Kennington Park Road and Chaplin referring to the waterfront set as the Thames Embankment.

Chaplin had interviewed several actresses to play the blind flower girl but was unimpressed with them all. While seeing a film shoot with bathing women in a Santa Monica beach, he found a casual acquaintance, Virginia Cherrill. Cherrill waved and asked if she would ever get the chance to work with him. After a series of poor auditions from other actresses, Chaplin eventually invited her to do a screen test. She was the first actress to subtly and convincingly act blind on camera due to her near-sightedness, and Cherrill signed a contract on November 1, 1928.

=== Principal photography ===
Filming for City Lights officially began on December 27, 1928, after Chaplin and Carr had worked on the script for almost an entire year. On the set, Chaplin was noted for doing many more "takes" than other directors at the time. Production began with the first scene at the flower stand where the Little Tramp first meets the Blind Flower Girl. The scene took weeks to shoot, and Chaplin first began to have second thoughts about casting Cherrill. Years later, Cherrill said, "I never liked Charlie and he never liked me." In his autobiography, Chaplin took responsibility for his on-set tensions with Cherrill, blaming the stress of making the film for the conflict. "I had worked myself into a neurotic state of wanting perfection", he remembered. Filming the scene continued until February 1929 and again for ten days in early April before Chaplin put the scene aside to be filmed later. He then shot the opening scene of the Little Tramp waking up in a newly unveiled public statue. This scene involved up to 380 extras and was especially stressful for Chaplin to shoot. During this part of shooting, construction was being done at Chaplin Studios because the city of Los Angeles had decided to widen La Brea Avenue and Chaplin was forced to move several buildings away from the road.

Chaplin then shot the sequence where the Little Tramp first meets the millionaire and prevents him from killing himself. During filming, Henry Clive suddenly decided that he did not want to jump into the tank of cold water in the scene, causing Chaplin to storm off the set and fire Clive. He was quickly replaced by Harry Myers, whom Chaplin had known while under contract at Keystone Studios. Chaplin finished shooting the sequence on July 29, 1929, with exteriors at Pasadena Bridge. Chaplin then shot a sequence that was eventually cut from the film involving the Little Tramp attempting to retrieve a stick that was stuck in a grate. The scene included a young Charles Lederer; Chaplin later praised the scene, but insisted that it needed to be cut. He then continued filming the scenes with the millionaire until September 29, 1929.

In November, Chaplin began working with Cherrill again in some of the Flower Girl's less dramatic scenes. While waiting for her scenes for several months, Cherrill had become bored and openly complained to Chaplin. During the filming of one scene, Cherrill asked Chaplin if she could leave early so that she could go to a hair appointment. Chaplin fired Virginia Cherrill and replaced her with Georgia Hale, Chaplin's co-star in The Gold Rush. Although Chaplin liked her screen test, even he realized he had shot far too much already to reshoot all of the flower girl's scenes. Chaplin also briefly considered sixteen-year-old actress Violet Krauth, but he was talked out of this idea by his collaborators. Chaplin finally re-hired Cherrill to finish City Lights. She demanded and got a raise to $75 per week. Approximately seven minutes of test footage of Hale survives and is included on the DVD release; excerpts were first seen in the documentary Unknown Chaplin along with an unused opening sequence.

Chaplin then cast Florence Lee as the Blind Girl's grandmother and shot scenes with Cherrill and Lee for five weeks. In late 1929, Chaplin re-shot the first Flower Shop scene with Cherrill. This time, the scene was completed in six days and Chaplin was happy with Cherrill's performance. Chaplin had been shooting the film for a year and was only a little more than half way finished. From March to April 1930, Chaplin shot the scenes inside of the millionaire's house at the Town House on Wilshire Boulevard. He hired Joe Van Meter and Albert Austin, whom he had known since his days working for Fred Karno, as the burglars. In the late spring of 1930, Chaplin shot the last major comedy sequence: the boxing match. Chaplin hired Keystone actor Hank Mann to play the Tramp's opponent. Chaplin took four days to rehearse, and then six to shoot it, between June 23 and 30. Chaplin was initially nervous over the attendance for this scene so he invited his friends to be extras. Over 100 extras were present. Chaplin's performance in the scene was so humorous that more people arrived daily to be extras.

In July and August, Chaplin finished up six weeks of smaller scenes, including the two scenes of the Tramp being harassed by newsboys, one of whom was played by a young Robert Parrish. In September 1930, Chaplin finished the shooting of the iconic final scene which took six days. Chaplin said that he was happy with Cherrill's performance in the scene, and that she had eventually understood the role. When talking about his directing style on set, Chaplin stated that "everything I do is a dance. I think in terms of dance. I think more so in City Lights." From October to December 1930, Chaplin edited the film and created the title cards.

When he completed the film, silent films had become generally unpopular. But City Lights was one of the great financial and artistic successes of Chaplin's career, and it was his personal favorite of his films. Especially fond of the final scene, he said, "[I]n City Lights just the last scene ... I'm not acting ... Almost apologetic, standing outside myself and looking ... It's a beautiful scene, beautiful, and because it isn't over-acted." The amount of film used for the project was uncharacteristic for the time and was a sign of the long production process. Chaplin shot 314,256 feet of film, and the completed film ran 8,093 feet. This made a shooting ratio of approximately 38.8 feet of film for each foot of film that made it in the final version.

=== Music ===
City Lights marked the first time Chaplin composed the film score to one of his productions. While Chaplin preferred his films to have live sound, by the 1930s most theaters had gotten rid of their orchestras. Many of his critics claimed he was doing it to grab more credit. Chaplin, whose parents and many members of the Chaplin family were musicians, was struggling with the professional musicians he hired and took it upon himself to compose the score. It was written in six weeks with Arthur Johnston and included over one hundred musical cues. Chaplin told a reporter that "I really didn't write it down. I hummed and Arthur Johnston wrote it down, and I wish you would give him credit because he did a very good job. It is all simple music, you know, in keeping with my character." The intention was to have a score that would translate the characters' emotions through its melodies. The score was recorded in five days with musical arranger Alfred Newman.

The main theme used as a leitmotif for the blind flower girl is the song "La Violetera" ("Who'll Buy my Violets") from Spanish composer José Padilla. Chaplin was unable to secure the original song performer, Raquel Meller, in the lead role, but used her song anyway as a major theme. Chaplin lost a lawsuit to Padilla (which took place in Paris, where Padilla lived) for not crediting him. Some modern editions released for video include a new recording by Carl Davis.

== Release, reception, and legacy ==
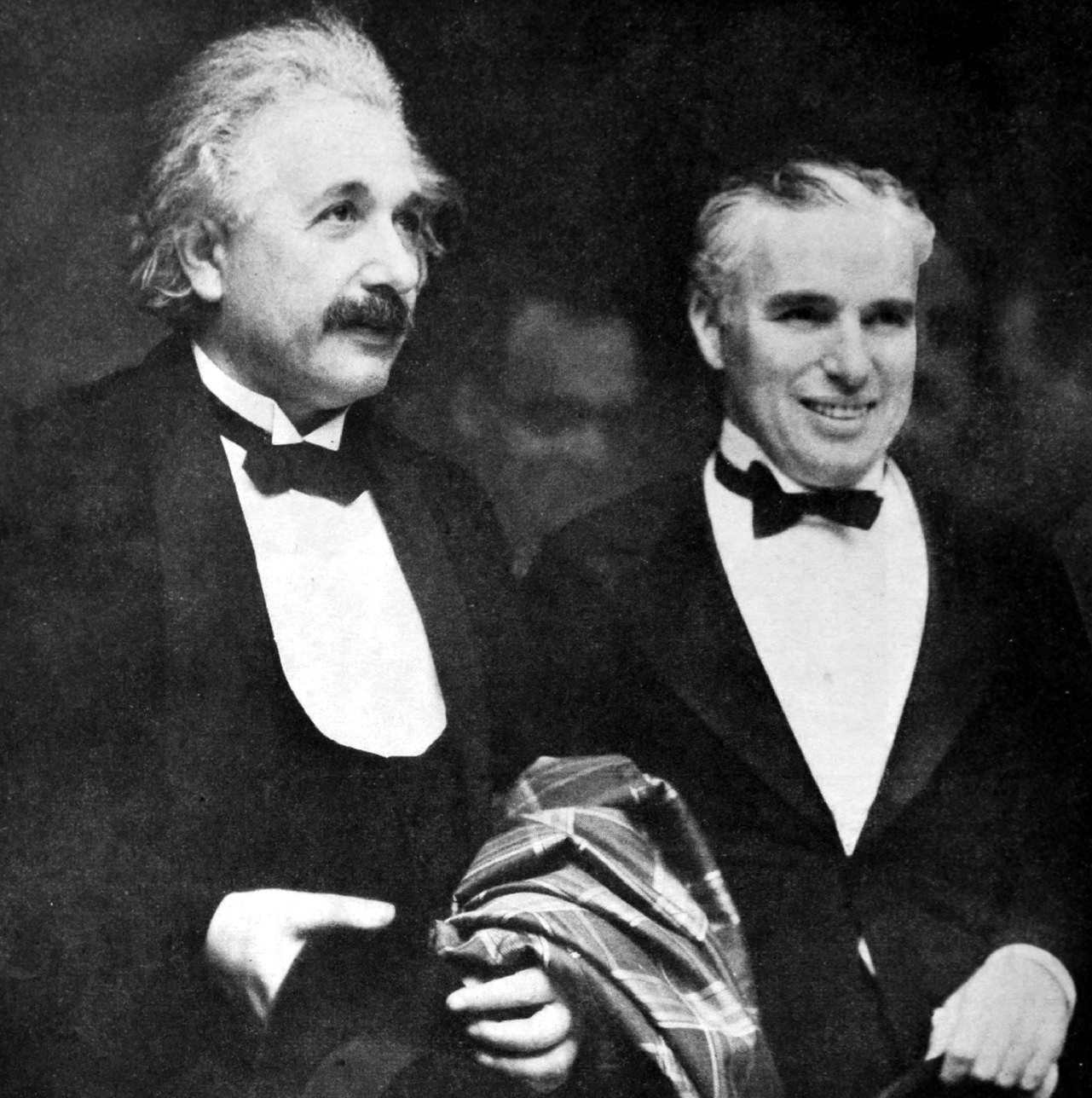
Charlie Chaplin with Albert Einstein at the premiere of City Lights

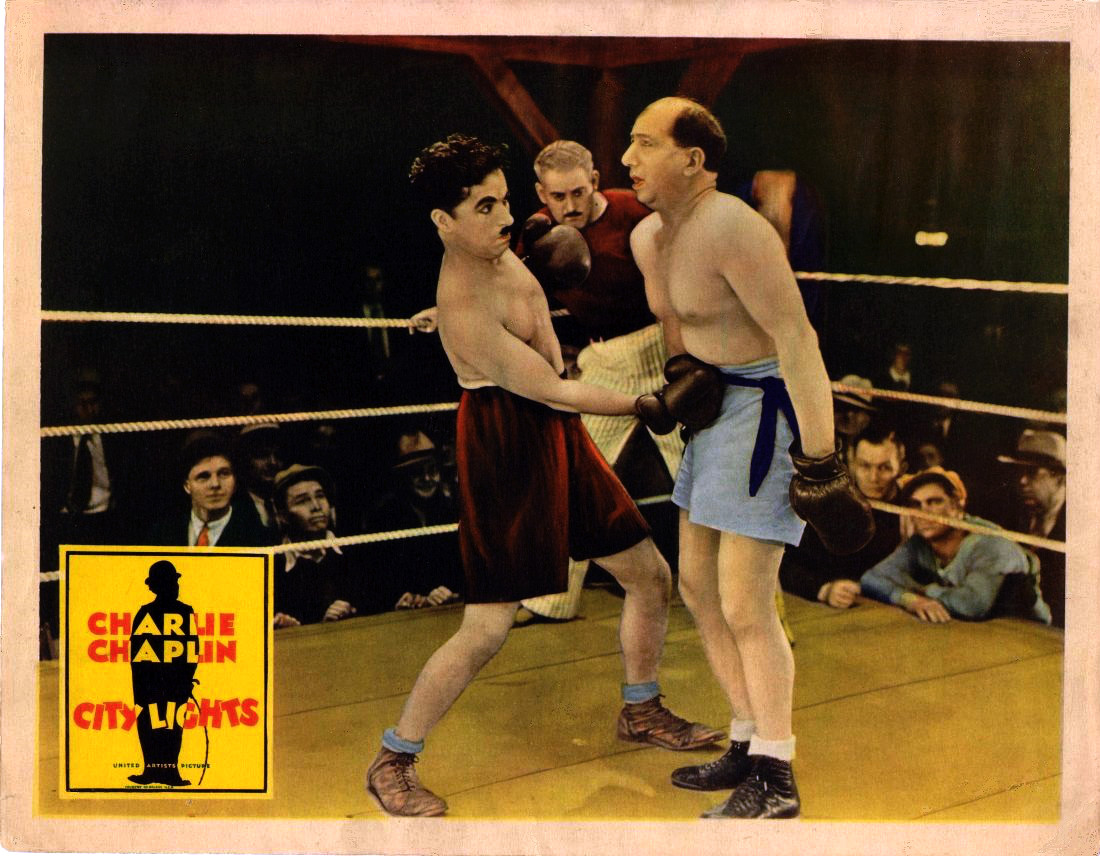
Lobby card

Two weeks prior to the premiere, Chaplin decided to have an unpublicized preview at Los Angeles' Tower Theatre. It went poorly, attracting a small and unenthusiastic crowd. Better results were seen at the gala premiere on January 30, 1931, at the Los Angeles Theater. Albert Einstein and his wife were the guests of honor, and the film received a standing ovation. It next premiered at the George M. Cohan Theater in New York where Chaplin closely supervised the release, spending the day doing interviews, and previously spending $60,000 on the advertising, as he was frustrated with what UA's publicists had come up with. Chaplin demanded half of the total gross, and considering audiences would be more attracted by the film itself than its technology, he demanded higher ticket prices compared to talkies.

Chaplin was nervous about the film's reception because silent films were becoming obsolete by then, and the preview had undermined his confidence. Nevertheless, City Lights became one of Chaplin's most financially successful and critically acclaimed works. Following the good reception by American audiences, with estimated theatrical rentals of $2 million, a quarter of which came from its 12-week run at the Cohan, Chaplin went on a sixteen-day world tour between February and March 1931, starting with a premiere at London's Dominion Theatre on February 27. The film was enthusiastically received by Depression-era audiences, earning $4.25 million in worldwide rentals during its initial release.

Reviews were mostly positive. A film critic for the Los Angeles Examiner said that "not since I reviewed the first Chaplin comedies way back in the two-reel days has Charlie given us such an orgy of laughs." The New York Times reviewer Mordaunt Hall considered it "a film worked out with admirable artistry". Variety declared it was "not Chaplin's best picture" but that certain sequences were "hilarious". The New Yorker wrote that it was "on the order of his other [films], perhaps a little better than any of them" and that it gave an impression "not often—oh, very seldom—found in the movies; an indefinable impression perhaps best described as a quality of charm." On the other hand, Alexander Bakshy of The Nation was highly critical of City Lights, objecting to the silent format and over-sentimentality and describing it as "Chaplin's feeblest".

The popularity of City Lights endured, with the film's re-release in 1950 again positively received by audiences and critics. In 1949, the critic James Agee wrote in Life magazine, that the final scene was the "greatest single piece of acting ever committed to celluloid." Richard Meryman called the final scene one of the greatest moments in film history. Charles Silver, Curator of Film at the Museum of Modern Art, stated that the film is so highly regarded because it brought forth a new level of lyrical romanticism that had not appeared in Chaplin's earlier works. He adds that like all romanticism, it is based in the denial of the real world around it. When the film premiered, Chaplin was much older, he was in the midst of another round of legal battles with former spouse Lita Grey, and the economic and political climate of the world had changed. Chaplin uses the Girl's blindness to remind the Tramp of the precarious nature of romanticism in the real world, as she unknowingly assaults him multiple times. Film.com critic Eric D. Snider said that by 1931, most Hollywood filmmakers either embraced sound films, resigned themselves to their inevitability, or just gave up making movies, yet Chaplin held firm with his vision in this project. He also noted that few in Hollywood had the clout to make a silent film at that late date, let alone do it well. One reason was that Chaplin knew the Tramp could not be adapted to talking movies and still work.

Several well-known directors have praised City Lights. Orson Welles said it was his favorite film. In a 1963 interview in the American magazine Cinema, Stanley Kubrick rated City Lights as fifth among his top ten films. In 1972, the renowned Russian director Andrei Tarkovsky placed City Lights as fifth among his top ten and said of Chaplin, "He is the only person to have gone down into cinematic history without any shadow of a doubt. The films he left behind can never grow old." The acclaimed French filmmaker Robert Bresson placed this film as first and second on his top ten films of all time. George Bernard Shaw called Chaplin "the only genius to come out of the movie industry". Celebrated Italian director Federico Fellini often praised this film, and his Nights of Cabiria refers to it. In the 2003 documentary Charlie: The Life and Art of Charles Chaplin, Woody Allen said it was Chaplin's best picture. Allen is said to have based the final scene of his 1979 film Manhattan on its final scene. Chaplin biographer Jeffrey Vance has summarized all the best criticism and all the notable filmmakers who have singled out City Lights as their favorite Chaplin film throughout the decades in the Criterion Collection audio commentary track for the film. Vance has written that among all the praise afforded the film can be added that "City Lights also holds the distinction of being Chaplin's own favorite of all his films." Canadian-American ambient rock band Vision Eternel based the artwork of its 2024 extended play, Echoes from Forgotten Hearts, on City Light's film poster. A number of Japanese filmmakers and actors were influenced by Chaplin works including City Lights, and the company Daito Kogyo produced and released several obscure films based on City Lights and other Chaplin films. (Note: The director Hikaru Hoshi and his assistant director recorded Chaplin films including City Lights at movie theaters, and reshot them with the identical costumes and compositions. However, Hoshi was rather unwilling to announce their productions, and his son Noriaki Yuasa was unaware of these films until an acquaintance informed him.)

French experimental musician and film critic Michel Chion has written an analysis of City Lights, published as Les Lumières de la ville. Slavoj Žižek used the film as a primary example in his essay "Why Does a Letter Always Arrive at Its Destination?". Film critic Roger Ebert of Chicago Sun-Times gave the film four stars out of four writing the film "contains the slapstick, the pathos, the pantomime, the effortless physical coordination, the melodrama, the bawdiness, the grace, and, of course, the Little Tramp--the character said, at one time, to be the most famous image on earth." He added the film in his Great Movies list. Chaplin's original "Tramp" suit from the film was donated by him to the Museum of Natural History of Los Angeles County.

City Lights was released as a dual-format Blu-ray and DVD by the Criterion Collection in 2013, both of which include trailers of the film, archival footage from production, and an audio commentary track by Chaplin biographer and scholar Jeffrey Vance, among others. The new cover was illustrated by Canadian cartoonist Seth.

=== Accolades ===
In 1952, Sight and Sound magazine revealed the results of its first poll for "The Best Films of All Time"; City Lights was voted #2, after Vittorio DeSica's Bicycle Thieves. In 2002, City Lights ranked 45th on the critics' list. That same year, directors were polled separately and ranked the film as 19th overall. In 1991, the Library of Congress selected City Lights for preservation in the United States National Film Registry as being "culturally, historically, or aesthetically significant". In 2007, the American Film Institute's tenth anniversary edition of 100 Years... 100 Movies ranked City Lights as the 11th greatest American film of all time, an improvement over the 76th position on the original list. AFI also chose the film as the best romantic comedy of American cinema in 2008's "10 Top 10". The Tramp was number 38 on AFI's list of the 50 Best Heroes, and the film ranked at 38th among the funniest films, 10th among the greatest love stories, and 33rd on the most inspiring films. The film's original 1931 poster, illustrated by Hap Hadley, was ranked 52nd on the AFI's list "Top 100 American Movie Poster Classics" in 2003.

The film is recognized by American Film Institute in these lists:

- 1998: AFI's 100 Years...100 Movies – #76
- 2000: AFI's 100 Years...100 Laughs – #38
- 2002: AFI's 100 Years...100 Passions – #10
- 2003: AFI's 100 Years...100 Heroes & Villains: The Tramp – #38 Hero
- 2003: AFI's 100 Years... 100 American Movie Poster Classics – #52
- 2006: AFI's 100 Years...100 Cheers – #33
- 2007: AFI's 100 Years...100 Movies (10th Anniversary Edition) – #11
- 2008: AFI's 10 Top 10: #1 Romantic Comedy Film

The Village Voice ranked the film at number 37 in its Top 250 "Best Films of the Century" list in 1999, based on a poll of critics. The film was included in Time's All-Time 100 best movies list in 2005. In 2006, Premiere issued its list of "The 100 Greatest Performances of all Time", putting Chaplin's performance as "The Tramp" at No. 44. City Lights was ranked seventeenth on Cahiers du cinéma's 100 Greatest Films, a 2008 poll of 78 film historians and critics organized by Claude-Jean Philippe. In the 2012 Sight & Sound polls, it was ranked the 50th-greatest film ever made in the critics' poll and 30th in the directors' poll. In the earlier 2002 version of the list the film ranked 45th among critics and 19th among directors. In 2015, City Lights ranked 18th on BBC's "100 Greatest American Films" list, voted on by film critics from around the world. The film was voted at No. 21 on the list of "The 100 greatest comedies of all time" by a poll of 253 film critics from 52 countries conducted by the BBC in 2017. In 2021 the film ranked 16th on Time Out magazine's list of The 100 best movies of all time.

== See also ==
- List of United States comedy films
- List of boxing films

== Cited sources ==
- Chaplin, Charlie (1964). My Autobiography. Simon & Schuster. ISBN 1612191932.
- Chion, Michel (1989). Les Lumières de la ville, Charles Chaplin: étude critique. Fernand Nathan. ISBN 978-2-09-188623-7.
- Flom, Eric L. (January 1, 1997). Chaplin in the Sound Era: An Analysis of the Seven Talkies. McFarland. ISBN 978-0-7864-0325-7.
- Kamin, Dan (September 5, 2008). The Comedy of Charlie Chaplin: Artistry in Motion. Scarecrow Press. ISBN 978-0-8108-7781-8.
- Maland, Charles J. (September 3, 2007). City Lights. British Film Institute. ISBN 978-1-84457-175-8.
- Milton, Joyce (October 25, 2011). Tramp: The Life of Charlie Chaplin. Premier Digital Publishing. ISBN 978-1-937624-49-1.
- Rebello, Stephen; Allen, Richard C. (1988). Reel Art: Great Posters from the Golden Age of the Silver Screen. New York: Abbeville Press. ISBN 0-89659-869-1.
- Robinson, David (1985). Chaplin:His Life and Art. New York: McGraw-Hill Books Company. ISBN 0-07-053181-1.
- Vance, Jeffrey (2003). Chaplin: Genius of the Cinema. New York: Harry N. Abrams. ISBN 0-8109-4532-0.
- Weissman, Stephen M. (2008). Chaplin: A Life. Arcade Publishing. ISBN 978-1-55970-892-0.
- Žižek, Slavoj (August 21, 2013). Enjoy Your Symptom! Jacques Lacan in Hollywood and Out. Routledge. ISBN 978-1-135-30000-5.
