= José Padilla (composer) =

Spanish composer and pianist

Maestro Padilla
- Born: José Padilla Sánchez; 28 May 1889; Almería, Spain
- Died: 25 October 1960 (aged 71); Madrid, Spain
- Occupations: Composer and pianist
- Notable work: "La Violetera"; "El Relicario"; "Valencia"

José Padilla Sánchez (28 May 1889 – 25 October 1960), popularly known as Maestro Padilla, was a famous Spanish composer and pianist. He was best known for the songs La Violetera and El Relicario, popularized by cuplé singer Raquel Meller, and the pasodoble Valencia.

External audio
- You may hear Jose Padilla's El Relicario sung by Néstor Mesta Cháyres with the Alfredo Antonini Orchestra in 1946 Here

He became famous in France as he composed songs for the Moulin Rouge, like Ça c'est Paris. La Violetera was adapted by Charlie Chaplin for the soundtrack of City Lights (1931).

== Biography ==
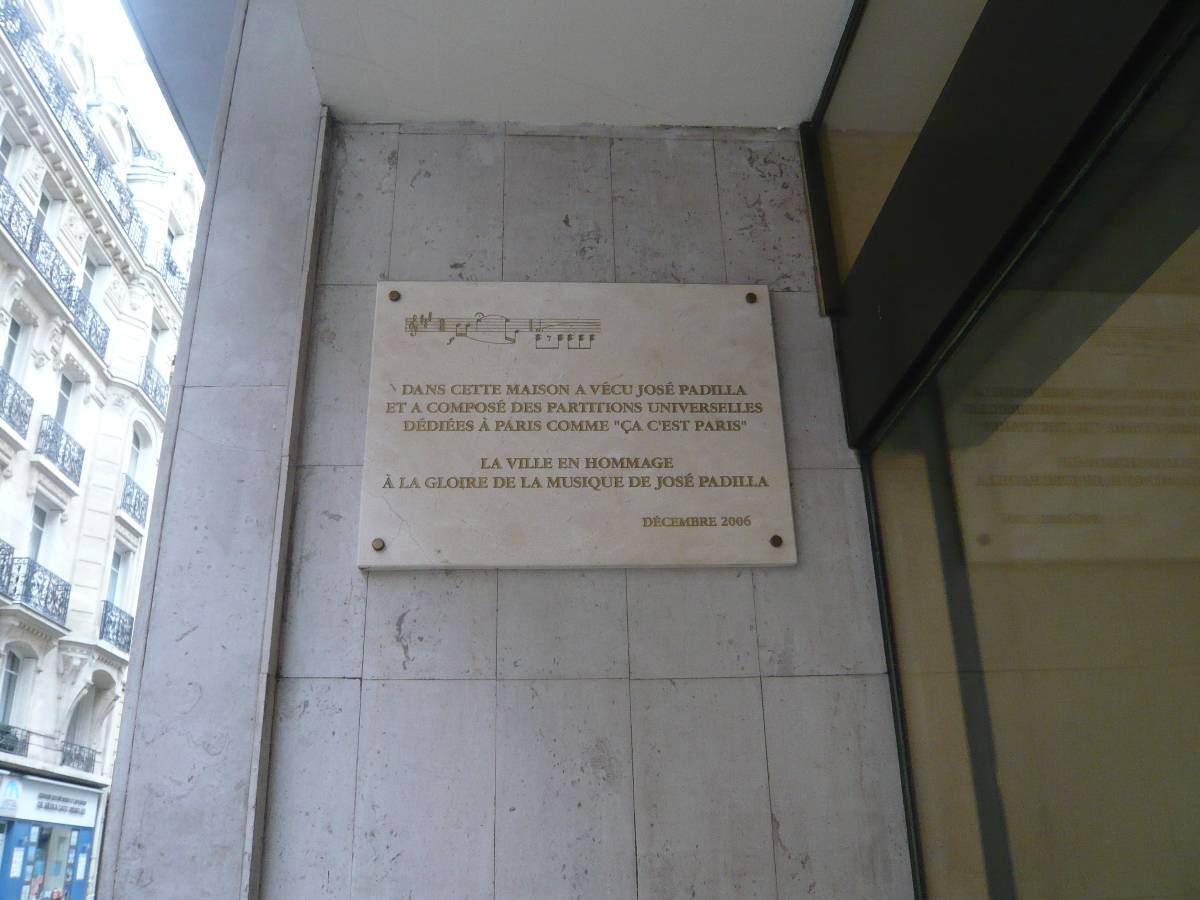
Commemorative plaque 10, rue Pergolèse in Paris

José Padilla Sánchez was born in Almería in 1889. He took his first music lessons from Almería's Municipal Band director and at fourteen he produced his first written music sheet titled Las dos palomas. By the time he lived in Madrid, he attended the Real Conservatorio de Música y Declamación. Also, he became acquainted with remarcable Zarzuela composers such as Tomás Bretón, Gerónimo Giménez y Amadeo Vives.

At 23 he moves Barcelona and from there to Buenos Aires and works as director for the Úrsula López Band. Later on he moved back to Barcelona and composed his popular El Relicario and La violetera. Next he moves to Paris and his works are performed in the Folies Bergere and Moulin Rouge music halls where his Ça c'est Paris sung by Mistinguett becomes very popular. In 1928 he signed a 25 million franc contract to travel to Argentina. There he produced works with Carlos Gardel.

In 1949, at 60, he returned to Madrid to the house that, after his death in 1960, held his museum.

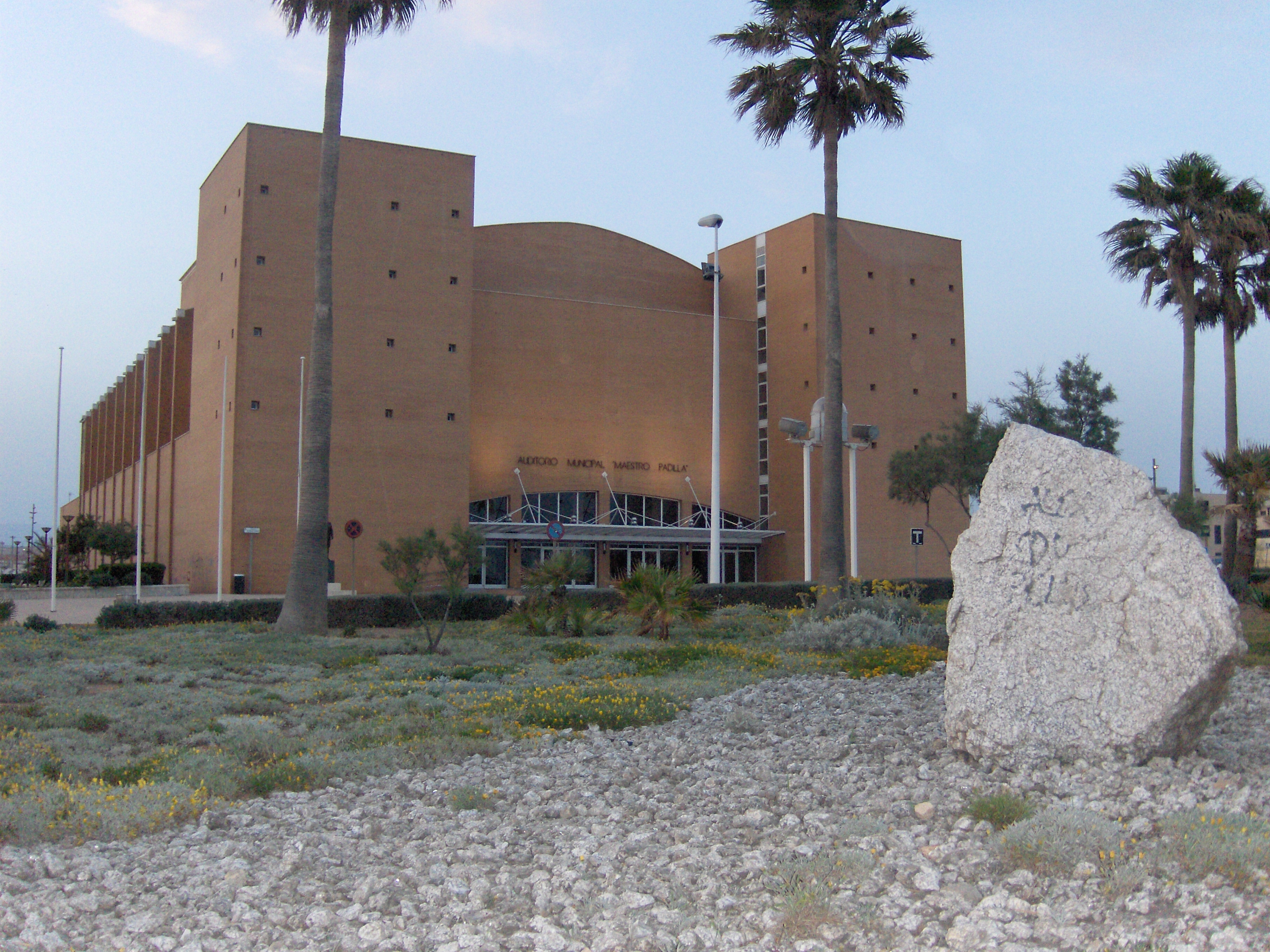
Maestro Padilla Auditorium in [Almería]

== Selected filmography ==
- Valencia (1927)
- Imperial Violets (1932)
- The Angel with the Trumpet (1948)
- In the Arms of the Sea (1951)
- The Lovers of Midnight (1953)

== Legacy ==
There is a commemorative plaque in his Paris residence. Also, in 1992 the Maestro Padilla Auditorium was built in home town Almería. There is a garden named Jardín Maestro Padilla in the Arganzuela district of Madrid.
