= Flor María Palomeque =

Ecuadorian actress, dancer, and model (born 1979)

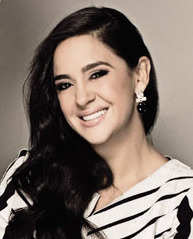
- Flor María Palomeque in 2013
- Born: Flor María Palomeque Guadamud; 6 August 1979 (age 46); Guayaquil
- Occupations: Actress, dancer
- Years active: Since 1996

Flor María Palomeque (born 6 August 1979) is an Ecuadorian actress, dancer, and model. She is best known for her work with David Reinoso, parodying television and media personalities and characters, most notably La Mofle, a character from La pareja feliz. She is married to actor Roberto Chávez and has four children.

== Biography ==
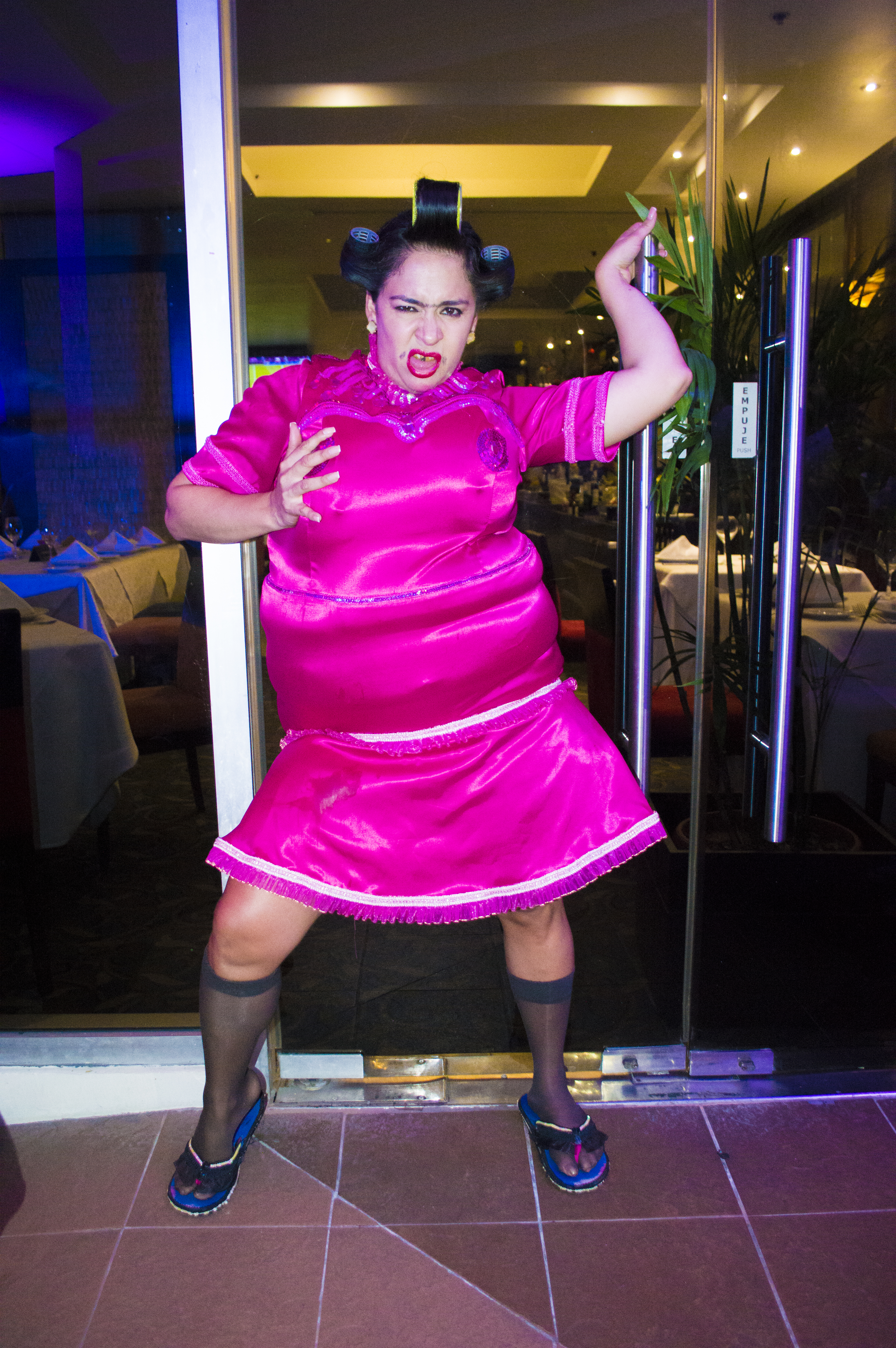
Palomeque portraying La Mofle, 2017.

Flor María Palomeque was born on 6 August 1979 in Guayaquil, Ecuador, the youngest of five children. She would be raised and complete her schooling there. In 1996, she began her career as a model and dancer, appearing on TC Televisión's A todo dar for a period of ten months when she was just 17, being known for her performance of La mosca. Later in 1996, she appeared on the comedy show Ni en Vivo and Directo with David Reinoso, Jorge Toledo Orbe, and Galo Recalde for its five year run. She and a large part of the cast of Ni en Vivo and Directo, notably Reinoso, joined with Ecuavisa for a new program, Vivos , which would run for seven years.

In 2008, Palomeque and the cast of Viovs joined Teleamazonas, becoming the protagonist of La pareja feliz, La Mofle, for the show's four-season run. In 2010, she appeared in the sequel of El Cholito, which originally appeared in, Mostro de Amor. Palomeque also played in the 2011-12 comedy La Tremebunda Corte, a spoof of Leopoldo Fernández's La Tremenda Corte. The next year, she became the hostess of the comedy interview show No culpes a la Mofle, playing the titular La Mofle.
