= Queta Lavat =

Mexican actress (1929–2023)

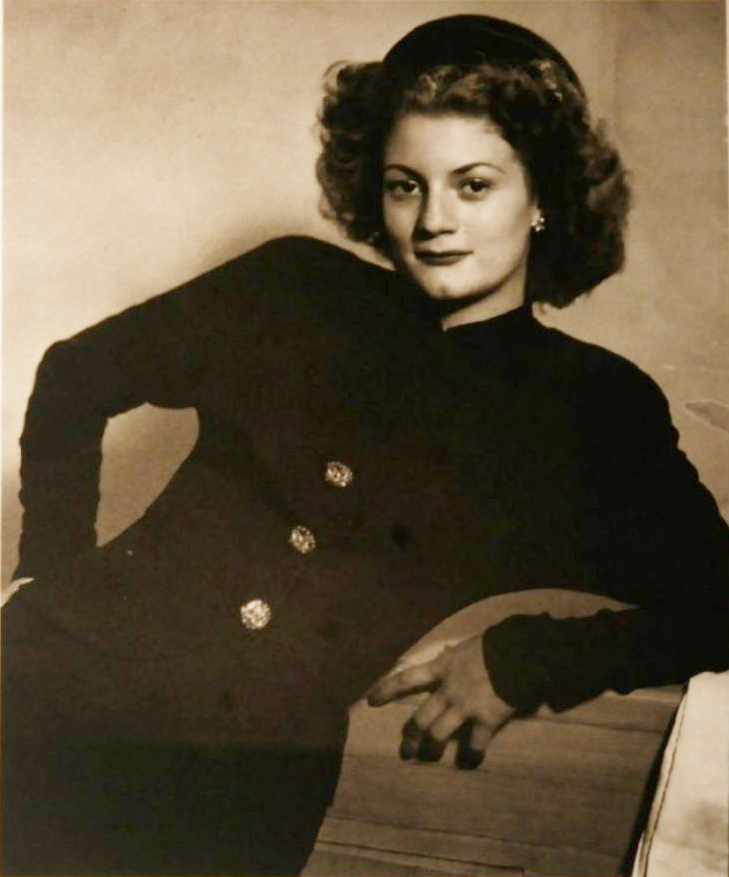
- Lavat, c. 1950s
- Born: Enriqueta Margarita Lavat Bayona; 23 February 1929; Mexico City, Mexico
- Died: 4 December 2023 (aged 94); Mexico City, Mexico
- Occupation: Actress
- Years active: 1946–2023
- Children: 4

Enriqueta Margarita Lavat Bayona (23 February 1929 – 4 December 2023), known professionally as Queta Lavat, was a Mexican actress. She was the sister of actor Jorge Lavat and voice actor José Lavat, and mother of Mexican sports anchor Pablo Carrillo. She was best known for her roles in Las tandas del principal, Cruz de amor and Clase 406. At the time of her death, she was one of the last surviving stars from the Golden Age of Mexican Cinema.

== Early life ==
Enriqueta Margarita Lavat Bayona was born in Mexico City on 23 February 1929. She had six brothers, two of whom were also well known actors, the late Jorge Lavat and José Lavat. Queta's family lived in Colonia Roma de Ciudad de México then later moved to Colonia San Rafael. When she was a young girl, her cousin María Elena Marqués encouraged her to study dance at La Academia Shirley, she later won a talent competition.

== Career ==
Lavat had many good memories of Jorge Negrete, having made five movies together: Dos tipos de cuidado, Un gallo en corral ajeno, Camino a Sacramento, Tal para cual and Me he de comer esa tuna. Lavat said: "For me it was wonderful to work with those stars, Pedro (Infante) and Jorge. Mr. Negrete, whom I called don Jorge, invited us to have coffee and sweet bread, entertained with conversations of the most at ease. I liked Jorge very well. My only vice has been to always knit and I knitted in my spare time, so Negrete told me: 'You are my little spider, because I have never seen a woman of your age knitting, that is the habit of grandmothers".

Lavat also worked with other famous actors such as Pedro Infante and Irma Dorantes, who was long one of her closest friends. The three appeared together in films like Dos tipos de cuidado and Menores de edad.

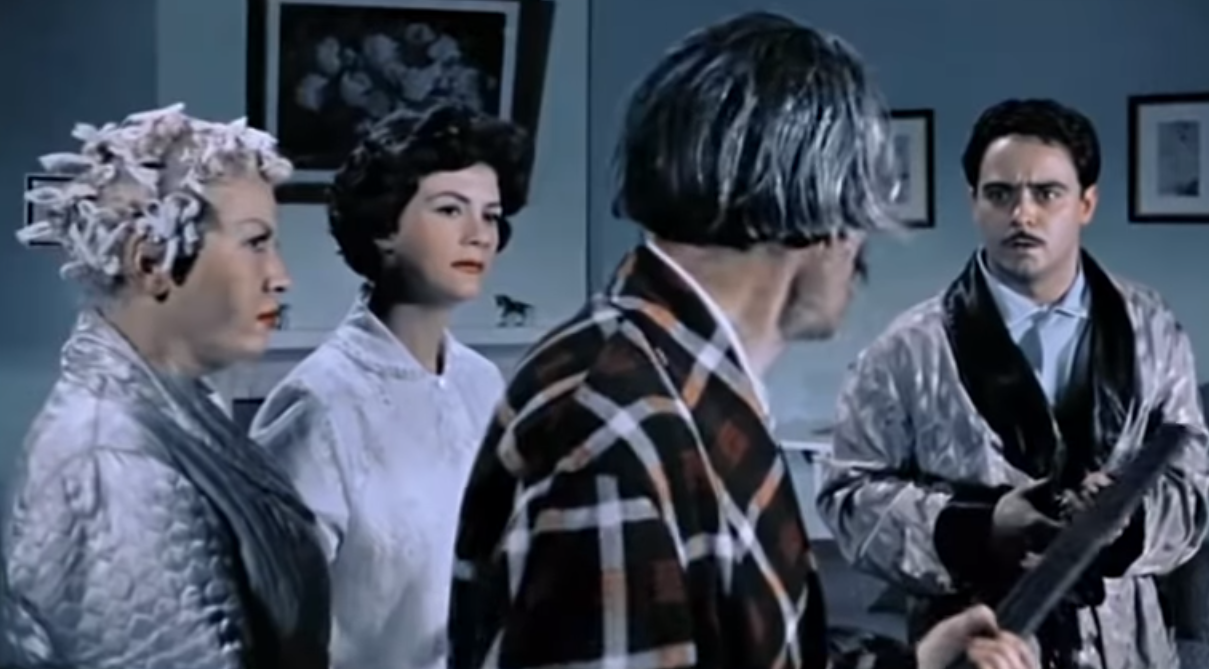
Lavat with Polo Ortín (right corner) in Santa Claus (1959)

Lavat's cousin María Elena Marqués was an integral part of her life, it was because of Marqués that she met her husband of 43 years and the father of her four sons. Armando Carrillo. Lavat said "Filming in Acapulco, she told me: I'm going to introduce you to a single, decent, hard working and handsome man. And she was right. We met and things went well. Eight years of dating and 43 years of marriage".

Lavat appeared in several episodes of the last season of La Tremenda Corte, junto a Leopoldo Fernández (Tres Patines). In all, her career was composed of 160 films and 38 TV series.

In 2011, Lavat appeared in the television series Amorcito corazón produced by Lucero Suárez, in the role as Sor Pilar. Regarding her career and her future, she spoke plainly: "The only thing I do not want, in any way, is to retire, as long as God grants me lucidity I will continue working, even if I am in a wheelchair".

== Later life and death ==
On 23 February 2009, the actress celebrated her 80th birthday surrounded by all her loved ones: brothers, sons, grandchildren, daughters-in-law, her son-in-law, childhood friends as well as acting colleagues. Among those who attended were Luz María Aguilar and Irma Dorantes.

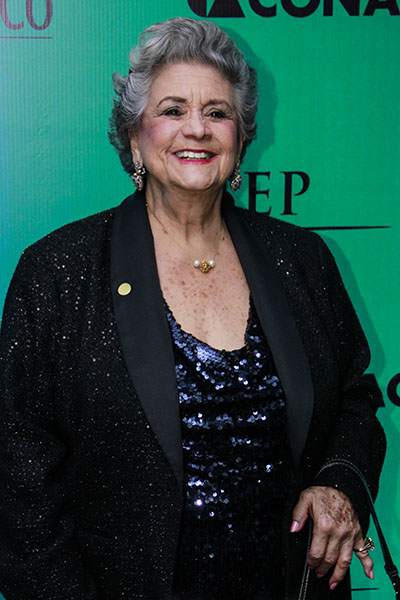
Lavat in 2015

Lavat died in Mexico City on 4 December 2023, at the age of 94.

== Filmography ==
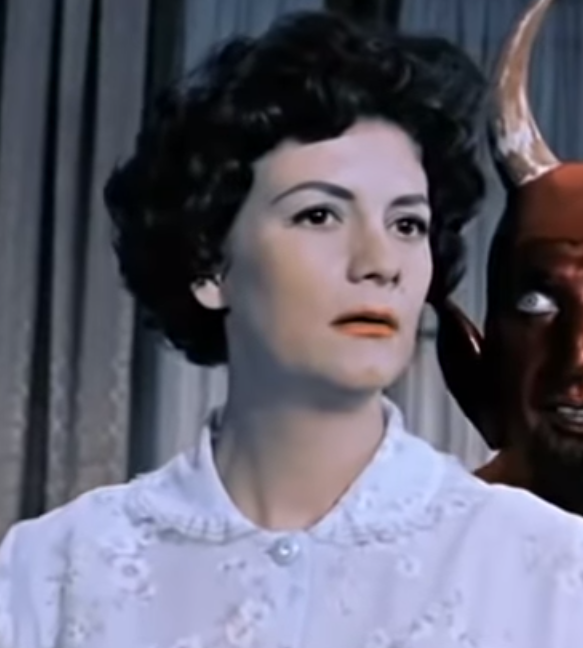
Lavat in Santa Claus (1959)

Television roles
Year	Title	Roles	Notes
1958	Un paso al abismo	Unknown role	
1965	Un largo amor	Unknown role	
1966	Vértigo	Unknown role	
1967	Angustia del pasado	Unknown role	
1970	Encrucijada	Christian	
1972	El edificio de enfrente	Unknown role	
1973	Mi primer amor	Unknown role	
1977	Rina	Martha	
1981	Nosotras las mujeres	Aída	
1981	Extraños caminos del amor	Jacinta	
1982	Vivir enamorada	Adriana's mother	
1987	Pobre señorita Limantour	Unknown role	
1990	Ángeles blancos	Unknown role	
1990	Yo compro esa mujer	Unknown role	
1993	Corazón salvaje	Mother Superior	
1994	La pura	Doña Antonia Espinoza Corcuerav	
1995	Alondra	Concepción Hurtado	
1999	Tres mujeres	Susana	
1999	Rosalinda	Directora de la prisión	
2000	Amigos x siempre	Mother superior	
2001	La intrusa	Rosalía de Limantur	
2001	Atrévete a olvidarme	Fidela	
2002–2003	Clase 406	Doña Cuquita Domínguez	
2003	Velo de novia	Socorro	
2004	Corazones al límite	Gudelia	
2004–2006	Rebelde	Angelita	
2008	Sexo y otros secretos	Esperanza	Episode: "El Plan"
2008–2012	La rosa de Guadalupe	Victoria	Episode: "Ni con el pétalo de una rosa"
2008–2012	La rosa de Guadalupe	Carmen Esperanza	Episode: "Lo que dicta el corazón"
2008–2009	En nombre del amor	Madre Superiora	5 episodes
2009–2010	Camaleones	Graciela	
2009–2010	Mar de amor	Alfonsina Zapata	9 episodes
2011	Como dice el dicho	Guadalupe León	Episode: "Del dicho al hecho"
2011	La fuerza del destino	Judge	Episode: "Huracanes"
2011-2012	Amorcito corazón	Sor Pilar	
2012	Miss XV	María	
2013	Mentir para vivir	Mercedes	3 episodes
2013	Corazón indomable	Lucrecía	6 episodes
2013–2014	Qué pobres tan ricos	Doña Matilde Álvarez Vda. de Ruizpalacios	Recurring role; 160 episodes
2015	Amor de barrio	Zelma	Recurring role; 36 episodes
2016	El hotel de los secretos	Señora Limantour	Recurring role; 46 episodes
2019	La usurpadora	Piedad Mejía Vda. de Bernal	
2019	Cita a ciegas	Romina	

=== Film ===
Film roles
Year	Title	Roles	Notes
2004	Pata de Gallo	Anciana	
2000	Religión, la Fuerza de la Costumbre		
1994	La pura (1994)	Doña Antonia Espinoza Corcuera	
1993	Amargo destino		
1991	El secuestro de un policía		
1990	Un corazón para dos		
1990	A gozar, a gozar, que el mundo se va a acabar		
1988	Central camionera		
1987	Cinco nacos asaltan Las Vegas		
1987	La bruja de la vecindad		
1985	Más vale pájaro en mano		
1984	Hermelinda Linda	Sra. de Pachochas	
1984	El monje loco	Doña Susana	
1983	Aborto: canto a la vida		
1983	Terror en los barrios	Madre de Luis	
1981	Lagunilla, mi barrio	Blanca	
1981	La Jorobada	Madre superiora	
1979	Los reyes del palenque		
1978	El perdón de la hija de nadie		
1978	Las noches de Paloma	Maura	
1978	La hora del jaguar	Sra. Salazar	
1978	Duro pero seguro	Esposa de Fulgencio	
1978	Los hijos del diablo		
1977	Sor tequila		
1977	Carita de primavera	Doña Rosa	
1975	Acapulco 12-22	Señora Pavia	
1975	La trenza	Marbella	
1974	La recogida	Directora orfanato	
1974	Los perros de Dios		
1974	Crónica de un amor	Sirvienta	
1973	Quiero vivir mi vida	María, nana de Lucía	
1973	San Simón de los Magüeyes		
1973	Peluquero de señoras	Reportera	
1972	El festín de la loba		
1972	La gatita	Señora Barrios	
1972	Me he de comer esa tuna		
1972	El deseo en otoño	Tía de Elena	
1972	El arte de engañar		
1971	Yesenia		
1971	Ya somos hombres	Mamá de Germán	
1970	La mujer de oro		as Enriqueta Lavat
1970	Cruz de amor	La nena Saldívar	
1970	La hermana Trinquete	Mujer robada en la calle	as Enriqueta Lavat
1969	El aviso inoportuno	Dueña perrito	as Enriqueta Lavat
1969	Modisto de señoras	Condesa / Cuquis	
1969	No se mande, profe	Maestra	
1968	María Isabel	Madre de Rubén	as Enriqueta Lavat
1967	Don Juan 67		
1967	Estrategia matrimonial	Nueva Rica	
1961	Memorias de mi general		
1961	El proceso de las señoritas Vivanco	Profesora de gimnasia	
1959	Santa Claus	Madre despertada	as Enriqueta Lavat
1956	Los hijos de Rancho Grande		Uncredited
1956	Spring in the Heart	Olga	
1954	La ladrona	Empleada de banco	as Enriqueta Lavat
1954	Retorno a la juventud	Enfermera	as Enriqueta Lavat
1954	The Price of Living		
1953	Dos tipos de cuidado	Genoveva	
1953	El jugador	Hortensia, wife of Francisco	
1953	Seven Women (Siete mujeres)		
1953	Canción de cuna	Sor María de Jesús	
1953	Made for Each Other (Tal Para Cual)	Paula	as Enriqueta Lavat
1952	Se le pasó la mano		
1952	Un gallo en corral ajeno	Petra, Sirvienta	as Enriqueta Lavat
1952	El derecho de nacer	Amelia	
1952	Chucho el remendado	Beatriz	
1952	Hombres sin alma	Norma	
1952	Perdición de mujeres		
1951	Get Your Sandwiches Here	Lupe	
1951	Menores de edad	María Teresa	as Enriqueta Lavat
1951	Vivillo desde chiquillo	Carmela	
1951	Among Lawyers I See You	La Segunda Esposa	
1951	Tenement House	Rosita	as Enriqueta Lavat
1951	Tierra baja	Pepa	
1950	Para que la cuna apriete		
1950	Doctor on Call	La Enfermera Irene	as Enriqueta Lavat
1950	Orange Blossom for Your Wedding	Nieta	Uncredited
1950	Si me viera don Porfirio		
1950	The Man Without a Face	Rosa Martínez	as Enriqueta Lavat
1950	Piña madura		as Enriqueta Lavat
1950	Nuestras vidas	Laura	
1950	La dama del alba	Maestra	Uncredited
1950	Red Rain	Hermana de Elisa	Uncredited
1950	Yo quiero ser mala	Pina Aguado del Rincón	
1949	Conozco a los dos	Chica mensajera	as Enriqueta Lavat
1949	Arriba el norte	Carmela Segura	
1949	Escuela para casadas		
1949	Al caer la tarde	Mercedes	
1949	Las tandas del principal	Martina	as Enriqueta Lavat
1949	Rough But Respectable (Soy charro de Levita)	Leonor Dávila	as Enriqueta Lavat
1949	La panchita (1949)	Margaritina	
1949	Tres hombres malos	Blanca	as Enriqueta lavat
1949	The Magician (El mago)	Secretaria	Uncredited
1949	Tuya para siempre	Marta	as Enriqueta Lavat
1949	Comisario en turno	Hija del Comisario	as Enriqueta Lavat
1948	La novia del mar	Amiga de Rosa	as Enriqueta Lavat
1948	Matrimonio sintético		
1948	La mujer del otro		
1947	Carita de cielo	Marisa	
1947	Ángel o demonio	Isabel	as Enriqueta Lavat
1946	Se acabaron las mujeres	Sirvienta	Uncredited
1946	Las colegialas	Estudiante	Uncredited

== Stage ==
- Conversations with Mom (Conversaciones con Mamá) (2017)

== Awards and nominations ==
- 60th Ariel Awards - Golden Ariel (Ariel de Oro) for her outstanding career in 2018
- Guadalajara International Film Festival (Festival Internacional de Cine en Guadalajara) - Homage for 70-year career in 2017
- Cineteca Nacional - Homage for 70-year career in 2017
- National Association of Actors - Distinctive Medal for 50-year career in 2016
- Goddesses of Silver (Las Diosas de Plata) - Silver Goddess Award for 69 year artistic career in the Golden Age of Mexican cinema in 2014
- Guadalajara International Film Festival (Festival Internacional de Cine en Guadalajara) - Industry Builders Award (Premio Forjadores de la Industria) for 69-year career in 2012
- Choca de Oro - Award for 50 Year Career in 2012
- Association of Latin Entertainment Critics - Premios Ace Award for "Best Supporting Actor in a Telenovela" in 1992, for her portrayal of Brigida in Ángeles blancos
