= The Associate (1996 film) =

- Theatrical release poster
- Directed by: Donald Petrie
- Screenplay by: Nick Thiel
- Based on: The Partner by Jenaro Prieto; L'Associé by Jean-Claude Carrière (uncredited) and René Gainville (uncredited)
- Produced by: Frederic Golchan; Adam Leipzig; Patrick Markey
- Starring: Whoopi Goldberg; Dianne Wiest; Tim Daly; Bebe Neuwirth; Eli Wallach
- Cinematography: Alex Nepomniaschy
- Edited by: Bonnie Koehler
- Music by: Christopher Tyng
- Production companies: Hollywood Pictures; Interscope Communications; PolyGram Filmed Entertainment
- Distributed by: Buena Vista Pictures Distribution (North America); PolyGram Filmed Entertainment (international)
- Release date: October 25, 1996
- Running time: 113 minutes
- Country: United States
- Language: English
- Box office: $12.8 million

The Associate is a 1996 American comedy film directed by Donald Petrie and written by Nick Thiel. It stars Whoopi Goldberg, Dianne Wiest, Eli Wallach, Tim Daly, and Bebe Neuwirth, alongside Austin Pendleton and Lainie Kazan.

== Plot ==
Investment banker Laurel Ayres is a smart and single woman trying to make it up the Wall Street corporate ladder, until one day she finds out that she is being passed over for a promotion because of her gender. Unable to face the fact that her less intelligent male protege, Frank Peterson, has now become her boss, she quits and tries to start up her own company only to find out that the male dominated world of Wall Street is not interested in taking an African American woman seriously, and thus is forced to create a fictional white man, Robert S. Cutty (inspired by a bottle of Cutty Sark) to legitimize her talents and make her professionally relevant in said world.

Ayres does extensive research into the cultural and performative codes of the culture she seeks to impersonate. Ayres' financial wisdom is joined by the intelligent and computer-savvy secretary Sally Dugan, who also was not properly recognized for her talents. Together, they are able to become the most successful independent stockbrokers in the world while helping a struggling high-tech computer company stay afloat.

However, the ruse eventually runs into problems because Cutty is still getting credit for Ayres' great ideas, while competing firms and tabloid journalists are willing to do anything in order to bring the wealthy and elusive Cutty into the public and on their side. Ayres is forced to recruit her best friend (who works at a nightclub as a female impersonator) to craft a disguise, complete with facial prosthetics, so she can appear as "Cutty" and fool the naysayers. When that fails, she and Dugan decide to kill Cutty, but the plan backfires, as they are then charged with his murder. Frank uncovers the ruse and blackmails the two women so he can be Cutty's front man.

The film ends with Ayres donning the Cutty disguise one last time to attend a meeting of an exclusive gentlemen's club to accept Cutty's awards and unmasking herself in order to teach the male-dominated industry the evils of racial and sexual discrimination. Ayres is finally given credit for her work and creates a huge business empire with her friends at the helm. Frank is ridiculed when he attempts to land a job with the business.

== Cast ==
- Whoopi Goldberg as Laurel Ayres / Mr. Robert S. Cutty
- Dianne Wiest as Sally Dugan
- Eli Wallach as Donald Fallon
- Tim Daly as Frank Peterson
- Bebe Neuwirth as Camille Scott
- Austin Pendleton as Aesop Franklin
- Lainie Kazan as Cindy Mason
- George N. Martin as Walter Manchester
- Kenny Kerr as Charlie
- Lee Wilkof as Bissel
- Željko Ivanek as SEC Agent Tompkins
- Colleen Camp Wilson as Detective Jones
- Jerry Hardin as Harley Mason
- Allison Janney as Sandy
- Larry Gilliard Jr. as Thomas
- Vincent Laresca as José
- Jonathan Freeman as Hockey game executive
- John Rothman as Jogging track executive
- Johnny Miller as himself
- Sally Jessy Raphael as herself
- Donald Trump as himself

== Production ==
=== Development ===
The film is a remake of René Gainville's 1979 French film of the same name, which, in turn, was based on Jenaro Prieto's 1928 novel The Partner.

=== Soundtrack ===
The soundtrack album for The Associate was released on October 15, 1996 by Motown Records. The soundtrack features Queen Latifah, Sophie B. Hawkins, American country singer Wynonna Judd, Canadian-American recording artist Tamia, CeCe Peniston, Kate Pierson and Cindy Wilson (both of The B-52s), Jamaican reggae singer Patra, and Swedish musician Louise Hoffsten.

== Release ==
=== Box office ===
The Associate opened theatrically on October 25, 1996 in 1,781 venues and earned $4,261,304 in its opening weekend, ranking sixth in the domestic box office. At the end of its run, the film grossed $12,844,057 domestically.

=== Critical response ===
The film received negative reviews from critics. On review aggregator website Rotten Tomatoes, the film has a 28% rating based on 18 critics, with an average rating of 5.2/10.

Peter Stack of the San Francisco Chronicle finds Goldberg "very funny playing out her scheme, which inevitably backfires" and thinks that "it's the peripheral characters that give the film its comic momentum".

In contrast, Roger Ebert writing in the Chicago Sun-Times, gave this film two stars, calling it "an uninspired recycling of the Tootsie formula. Though the film "scores some good points against the male-dominated hierarchy of the business world", Ebert is ultimately unconvinced by the Cutty character.
