= The Associate (1946 film) =

1946 film

- Directed by: Roberto Gavaldón
- Written by: Tito Davison
- Based on: The Partner by Jenaro Prieto
- Produced by: Carlos Carriedo Galván; Raúl Gutiérrez E.
- Starring: Hugo del Carril; Gloria Marín; Nelly Montiel
- Cinematography: Raúl Martínez Solares
- Edited by: Gloria Schoemann
- Music by: Manuel Esperón; Rosalío Ramírez
- Release date: 18 April 1946
- Running time: 106 minutes
- Country: Mexico
- Language: Spanish

The Associate (Spanish: El socio) is a 1946 Mexican drama film directed by Roberto Gavaldón and starring Hugo del Carril, Gloria Marín and Nelly Montiel. It is based on Jenaro Prieto's 1928 novel The Partner in which a financially struggling man invents a fictitious business partner in order to try to improve his prospects. The film's sets were designed by the art director Manuel Fontanals.

== Cast ==
- Hugo del Carril as Julián Pardo
- Gloria Marín as Anita Velasco
- Nelly Montiel as Graciela
- Clifford Carr as Samuel Goldenberg
- Rafael Alcayde as Luis
- Federico Mariscal as Pedrito
- Octavio Martínez as Sr. Gutiérrez
- José Morcillo as Coronel Ramírez
- Vicente Padula as Don Fortunato
- Luis G. Barreiro as Don Ramiro
- Roberto Meyer as Cipriano
- Juan Pulido as Inventor
- Raymundo Guízar
- Beatriz Ramos as Esposa de Davis
- Susana Guízar as Leonor
- Daniel Arroyo as Hombre jugando billar
- René Cardona as Corredor de bolsa
- Roberto Corell
- Joaquín Coss as Asistente de notario
- Fernando Curiel as Corredor de bolsa
- Alfonso Jiménez as Inventor
- José Muñoz as Corredor de bolsa
- Eduardo Noriega as Corredor de bolsa
- Félix Samper as Hombre jugando billar
- María Valdealde as Mujer con cuadro

== Bibliography ==
- Pilcher, Jeffrey M. Cantinflas and the Chaos of Mexican Modernity. Rowman & Littlefield, 2001.
