= El derecho de nacer (film) =

1951 film

- Theatrical release poster
- Directed by: Zacarías Gómez Urquiza
- Written by: Félix B. Caignet (adapted by Ramón Pérez Peláez and Jesús Galindo)
- Produced by: Jesús Galindo and Pedro Galindo
- Starring: Gloria Marín, Jorge Mistral, José Luis Moreno, Julián Soler, Gloria Alonso, Eugenia Galindo, Martha Roth
- Music by: Raúl Lavista and Félix B. Caignet
- Release date: June 27, 1952
- Running time: 90 minutes
- Language: Spanish

El derecho de nacer ("The Right to Be Born") is a 1952 Mexican film directed by Zacarías Gómez Urquiza and starring Gloria Marín, Jorge Mistral and Martha Roth. based on a Cuban radionovela (radioplay) of the same name by Félix B. Caignet. The movie broke box office records in Mexico when it was first released; during its release in Mexico City in June 1952, it was shown at the downtown Cine Orfeón for seven straight weeks.

== Plot ==
María Teresa (Bárbara Gil) is a wealthy young woman who finds herself unmarried and pregnant. She approaches a doctor (Jorge Mistral) to obtain an abortion with the hopes of avoiding a scandal that would affect her family. The doctor, hoping to convince her otherwise, flashes back to an incident of his life to explain his "right to life" stance.

== Cast ==
- Gloria Marín as María Elena
- Jorge Mistral as Dr. Alberto Limonta
- José Luis Moreno as Alberto Limonta Niño
- José Baviera as Don Rafael
- Gloria Alonso as Matildita Niña
- Eugenia Galindo as Sra. de Dn. Nicolás
- Martha Roth as Isabel Cristina
- José Baviera as Dn. Rafael del Junco
- Lupe Suárez as Mamá Dolores
- Bárbara Gil as María Teresa
- José María Linares-Rivas as Jorge Luis Armenteros
- Matilde Palou as Dña. Clemencia del Junco
- Queta Lavat as Amelia
- Tito Novaro as Alfredo Martínez
- Salvador Quiroz as Don Nicolás
- Manuel Trejo Morales as Ricardo del Castillo
- Adelina Ramallo as Matildita
- Rogelio Fernández as Bruno
- José Escanero as Dr. Pezzi
- Alfredo Varela padre as Doctor (uncredited)
- Rubén Galindo (uncredited)

== Bibliography ==
- Agrasánchez, Rogelio. Mexican Movies in the United States: A History of the Films, Theaters, and Audiences, 1920-1960. McFarland, 2006.
