= I Will Consult Mister Brown =

1946 film

- Directed by: Pío Ballesteros
- Written by: Julián Ayesta; Pío Ballesteros; José Luis Monter; Jenaro Prieto (novel); José Luis de Feliú
- Starring: Monique Thibaut; José Franco; Valeriano Andrés
- Cinematography: Luis Muñoz Alcolea
- Music by: Jesús García Leoz
- Production company: Grupo de Producción
- Release date: 1946
- Running time: 88 minutes
- Country: Spain
- Language: Spanish

I Will Consult Mister Brown (Spanish: Consultaré a Mister Brown) is a 1946 Spanish comedy film directed by Pío Ballesteros and starring Monique Thibaut, José Franco and Valeriano Andrés. It is based on the 1928 novel The Partner by the Chilean writer Jenaro Prieto. In order to stave off financial ruin, a man creates a fake business partner.

== Cast ==
- Valeriano Andrés as Anselmo García
- Lola Barrea
- José Franco
- Guillermo Marín
- Amparo Reyes
- Pilar Sala
- Monique Thibaut
- María Jesús Valdés
- Pepita C. Velázquez

== Bibliography ==
- Augusto M. Torres. Directores españoles malditos. Huerga Y Fierro Editores, 2004.
