= The Associate (1979 film) =

- Directed by: René Gainville
- Written by: Jean-Claude Carrière; René Gainville; Jenaro Prieto (novel)
- Produced by: Simone Allouche; René Gainville
- Starring: Michel Serrault; Claudine Auger; Catherine Alric
- Cinematography: Étienne Szabo
- Edited by: Raymonde Guyot
- Music by: Michel Bernholc; Mort Shuman
- Production companies: France 3 Maran Film
- Distributed by: Warner-Columbia Film
- Release date: 22 August 1979
- Running time: 94 minutes
- Countries: France; Hungary; West Germany
- Language: French
- Box office: $1.6 million

The Associate (French: L'associé) is a 1979 comedy film directed by René Gainville and starring Michel Serrault, Claudine Auger and Catherine Alric. A co-production between France, Hungary and West Germany it is an adaptation of the 1928 novel The Partner by Jenaro Prieto. The film served as the inspiration for a 1996 American remake The Associate.

The film's sets were designed by the art director Sydney Bettex.

== Cast ==
- Michel Serrault as Julien Pardot
- Claudine Auger as Agnès Pardot
- Catherine Alric as Alice Duphorin
- Judith Magre as Mme. Brezol
- Bernard Haller as Hellzer
- Marco Perrin as Vauban
- Jean Martin as Bastias
- Fabrice Josso as Thierry Pardot
- Henri Virlojeux as Urioste
- Mathieu Carrière as Louis
- Vadim Glowna as Marc Duphorin
- Astrid Frank as Marie-Claude Hellzer
- Daniel Prévost as Zephir
- Jacques Legras as Inspector Pernais
- Dominique Zardi as Le portier du ministère
- Nathalie Courval as La femme au bébé
- Jacques Dynam as Mathivet
- Jean-Pierre Coffe as L'employé du museum d'histoire naturelle
- Jean Leuvrais as Armand, le directeur
- Patrice Laffont as Un présentateur TV
- Christian Morin as L'animateur radio sur Europe 1
- Jean-Claude Carrière as Un homme à la lecture du testament
- Jean Degrave as André - le ministre de l'économie
- Olga Valéry as La dame aux bijoux
- Lionel Vitrant as Un agent de la sécurité d'Hellzer
- Béatrice Radian
- René Alié
- Jacques Galland
- Florence Brunold

== Bibliography ==
- Goble, Alan. The Complete Index to Literary Sources in Film. Walter de Gruyter, 1999.
