= The Mysterious Mr. Davis =

- Opening title
- Directed by: Claude Autant-Lara
- Written by: Jenaro Prieto (novel); Jacques Prévert; Cecil Madden
- Produced by: Claude Autant-Lara
- Starring: Henry Kendall; Kathleen Kelly; Alastair Sim
- Music by: John Reynders
- Production companies: Oxford Films; Veneficus Films
- Distributed by: RKO Pictures
- Release date: 1939
- Running time: 58 minutes
- Country: United Kingdom
- Language: English

The Mysterious Mr. Davis (also known as My Partner Mr Davis) is a 1939 British comedy drama film directed by Claude Autant-Lara and starring Henry Kendall, Kathleen Kelly and Alastair Sim. It was written by Jacques Prévert and Cecil Madden, based on the 1928 novel The Partner by Jenaro Prieto and was released the same year as an Italian adaptation The Silent Partner. The film was made as a quota quickie and distributed by the American company RKO Pictures.

== Cast ==
- Henry Kendall as Julian Roscoe
- Kathleen Kelly as Audrey Roscoe
- Richard Gofe as Teddy Roscoe
- Alastair Sim as Theodore F. Wilcox, the lunatic
- Morris Harvey as Samuel Goldenburg
- Jeanne Stuart as Anita Goldenburg
- A. Bromley Davenport as Lord Avonmouth
- Guy Middleton as Milton
- Quentin McPhearson as the landlord
- Ben Field as The Decorator
- Fred Duprez as Wilcox
- Alfred Wellesley as the pawnbroker
- Ethel Griffies as Mabel Wilcox
- May Hallatt as telegraph clerk

== Reception ==
The Monthly Film Bulletin wrote: "This film is uninspiring in every way – the photography is unimaginative, the plot incredible, the direction weak and the acting poor."

Kine Weekly wrote: "A film with no cohesion, most improbable story, with impossible situations, only relieved by work of the cast, who prove that they are capable of better things. ... The only bright spot is the earnestness with which the cast labour to produce something from nothing. The plot is inane, continuity is lacking, end the situations incredible and wearisome."
