= Círculo de Escritores Cinematográficos =

Spanish non-profit organization

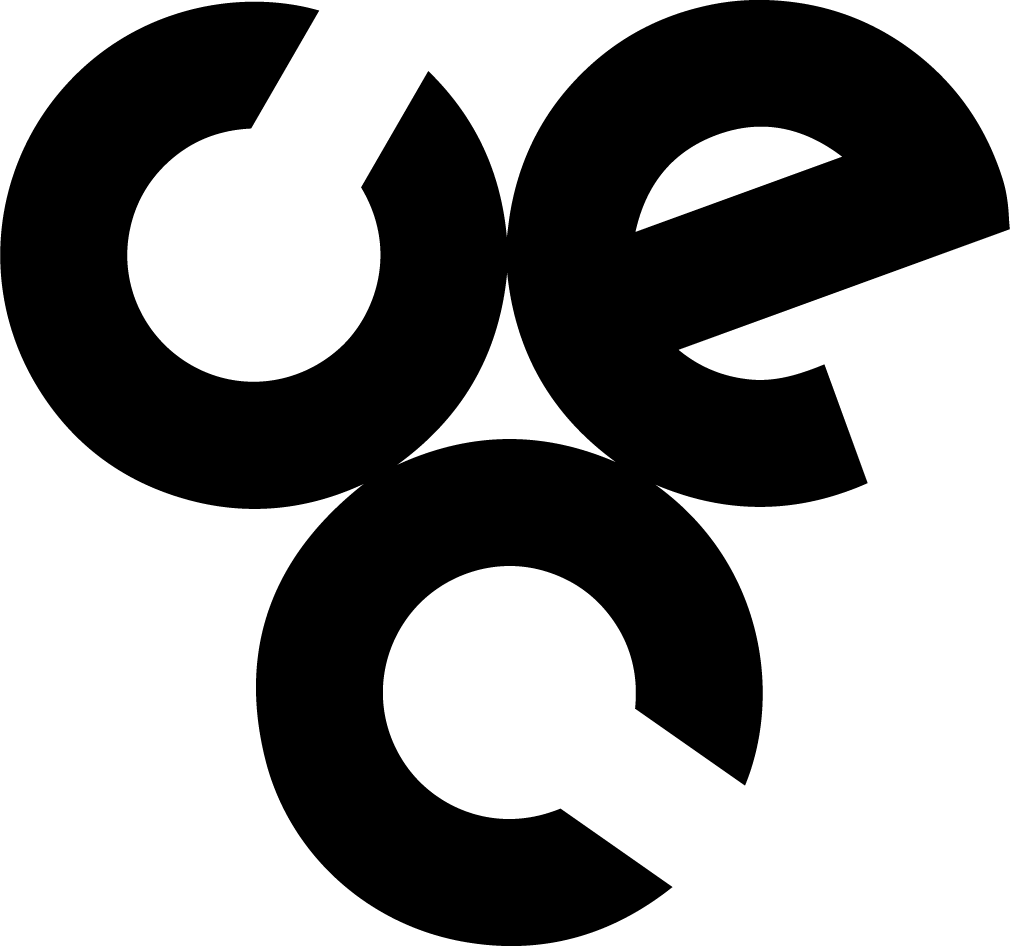
- Abbreviation: CEC
- Formation: 1945
- Founder: Fernando Viola; Luis Gómez Mesa; Carlos Fernández Cuenca; Joaquín Luis Romero Marchent; Pío García Viñolas; Francisco Hernández Blasco; Adriano del Valle; Pío Ballesteros; Fernando Merelo; José González de Ubieta; Domingo Fernández Barreira; Fernando Méndez Leite; Luis Figuerola; Antonio Barbero; Antonio Crespo
- Founded at: Madrid, Spain
- Type: NGO
- Legal status: Nonprofit organization
- Purpose: Film
- Website: cinecec.com

The Círculo de Escritores Cinematográficos (CEC), known as "Cinema Writers Circle" in English, is a private nonprofit organization supporting cinema and filmmakers in Spain. It awards the annual CEC Awards, commonly known as Premios CEC.

== History ==
The Círculo de Escritores Cinematográficos was founded in 1945 in Madrid by Fernando Viola, Luis Gómez Mesa, Carlos Fernández Cuenca, Joaquín Luis Romero Marchent, Pío García Viñolas, Francisco Hernández Blasco, Adriano del Valle, Pío Ballesteros, Fernando Merelo, José González de Ubieta, Domingo Fernández Barreira|es, Fernando Méndez-Leite, Luis Figuerola, Antonio Barbero, and Antonio Crespo.

== Description ==
CEC brings together writers and film critics in Spain in order to create, support, and promote cultural activities related to the various facets of film. The organisation's primary objective is the "protection and dissemination of film art".

== Premios CEC ==
Every year since 1946, except for 1988–1990, the CEC has held an awards ceremony, commonly known as Premios CEC, to honour the highest achievements in Spanish film in the previous year.
