= The Silent Partner (1939 film) =

1939 film by Roberto Roberti

- Directed by: Roberto Roberti
- Written by: Jenaro Prieto (novel); Guido Rispoli; Roberto Roberti
- Starring: Carlo Romano; Clara Calamai; Evi Maltagliati
- Cinematography: Massimo Terzano
- Edited by: Dolores Tamburini
- Music by: Umberto Mancini
- Production company: Scalera Film
- Distributed by: Scalera Film
- Release date: December 1939
- Running time: 85 minutes
- Country: Italy
- Language: Italian

The Silent Partner (Italian: Il socio invisibile) is a 1939 Italian drama film directed by Roberto Roberti and starring Carlo Romano, Clara Calamai and Evi Maltagliati. It is based on the 1928 novel The Partner by Jenaro Prieto, which was turned into a British film The Mysterious Mr. Davis the same year.

It was made by the Rome-based Scalera Films. The sets were designed by the art directors Gustav Abel and Alfredo Manzi.

== Synopsis ==
A financially struggling man creates a fake business partner. His creation is an enormous success despite the fact that nobody has ever met him.

== Cast ==
- Carlo Romano as Prado
- Clara Calamai as La moglie di Prado
- Evi Maltagliati as La diva
- Sergio Tofano as L'affaristo in borsa
- Erminio Spalla as Il colonello
- Virgilio Riento as Il maggiore
- Mariella Lotti as Un' educanda
- Jone Romano as La direttrice dell' educandato
- Giulio Alfieri
- Regina Bianchi
- Gemma Bolognesi
- Guido Celano
- Vasco Creti
- Licia D'Alba
- Mario Gallina
- Nicola Maldacea
- Clelia Matania
- Egisto Olivieri
- Felice Romano
- Guglielmo Sinaz

== Bibliography ==
- Goble, Alan. The Complete Index to Literary Sources in Film. Walter de Gruyter, 1999.
