= The Partner (Prieto novel) =

Novel by Jenaro Prieto

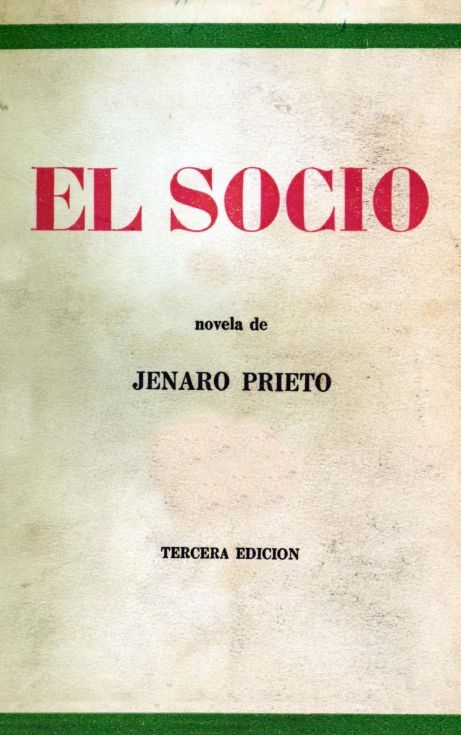
- Third edition cover from 1933
- Author: Jenaro Prieto
- Original title: El socio
- Language: Spanish
- Publication date: 1928
- Publication place: Chile
- Media type: Print
- LC Class: PQ8097.P77 S6

The Partner or The Associate (Spanish: El socio) is a 1928 novel by the Chilean writer and politician Jenaro Prieto.

== Adaptations ==
The story, about a financially struggling man who invents a fictitious business partner named Davis to try to boost his fortunes, has been adapted into films on a number of occasions including:

- The Silent Partner (1939)
- The Mysterious Mr. Davis (1939)
- The Associate (1946)
- I Will Consult Mister Brown (1946)
- The Associate (1979)
- The Associate (1996)

== Bibliography ==
- Salvatore Bizzarro. Historical Dictionary of Chile. Scarecrow Press, 2005.
