= Adam Leipzig =

American film and theater producer

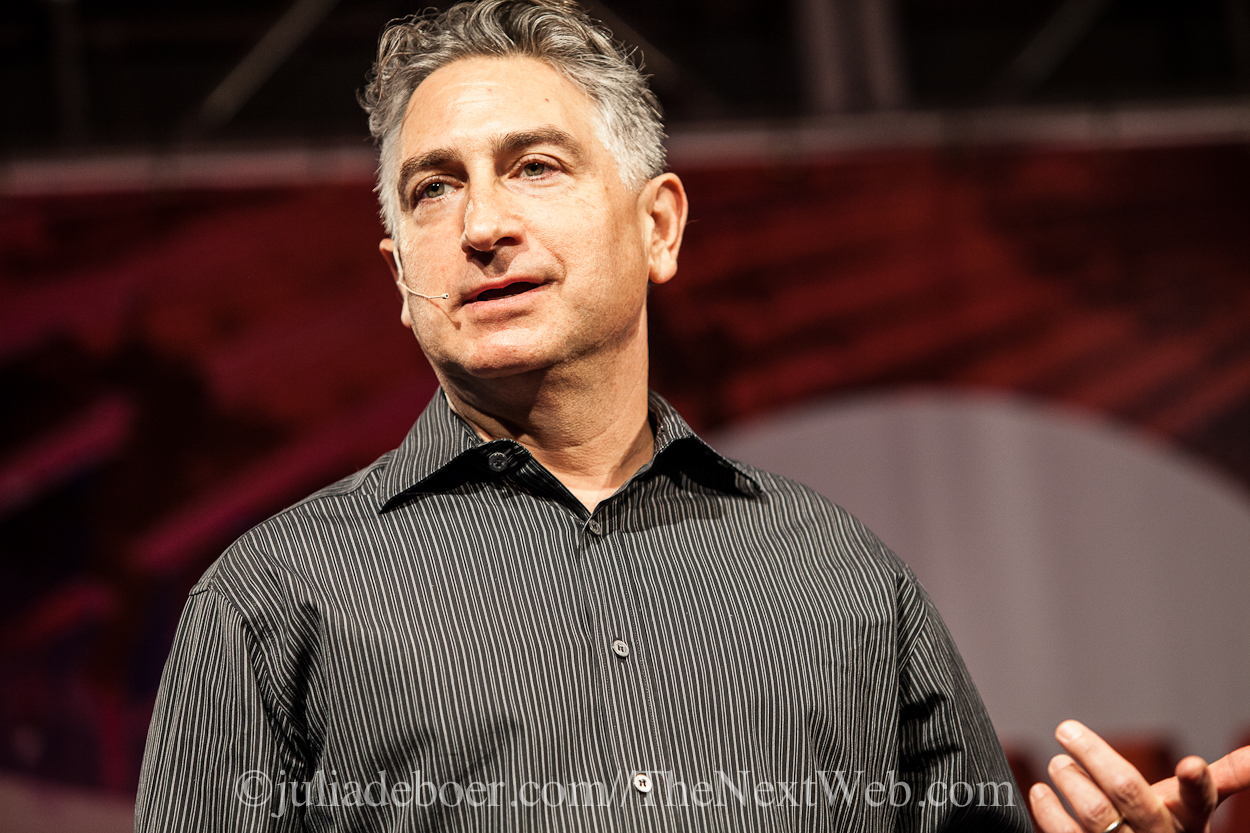
- Adam Leipzig in 2013
- Education: Yale University
- Occupations: Film producer; Theater producer; Author; Educator
- Years active: 1979–present
- Known for: Dead Poets Society (1989); Honey, I Shrunk the Kids (1989); Titus (1999); The Way Back (2010); March of the Penguins (2005); A Plastic Ocean (2016)
- Website: Official website

Adam Leipzig is the CEO of Entertainment Media Partners, an American film and theatre producer and executive, and author. As a former Disney executive, he supervised films such as Dead Poets Society (1989) and Honey, I Shrunk the Kids (1989). Leipzig produced Titus (1999), and The Way Back (2010). While president of National Geographic Films, he acquired the international rights to March of the Penguins, and created the US version, which won the Academy Award for Best Documentary Feature. Leipzig authored two books on film making.

He is a lecturer in the MBA and Executive Education programs at the University of California Berkeley Haas School of Business.

== Early life and education ==
Leipzig was born in Reseda, Los Angeles, a neighborhood in San Fernando Valley, California. He attended Yale University and graduated with a B.A. degree in literature in 1979. He also trained as Fellow in Arts and Public Policy at Coro Foundation.

== Career ==
=== Theater ===
After graduating from Yale, Leipzig began his career in the Los Angeles Theatre Center (formerly the Los Angeles Actors’ Theatre) as an unpaid assistant stage manager, eventually becoming a dramaturge/associate director.

In 1984, he participated as one of the representatives of Los Angeles theater companies in negotiations with the Los Angeles Olympic Arts Festival to include local theater productions.

Leipzig was one of the producers of Secret Honor, written by Donald Freed and Arnold M. Stone and directed by Robert Altman, which the latter had also made into a 1984 film of the same name. He left his staff position at the Theatre Center in 1986, but continued to consult and do translations for the company. Leipzig worked with Iranian theatre artist Reza Abdoh, and after Abdoh's death in 1995 organized the archiving of his works. In 1999, he helped launch Bang, Bang, You’re Dead, a play by William Mastrosimone. He also produced two plays by Donald Freed: American Iliad (2001) and The Einstein Plan (2010).

=== Filmmaking ===
Leipzig joined Walt Disney Studios/Touchstone Pictures as a creative executive in 1987 and in 1991 was promoted to senior vice president of motion picture production. Films he supervised included Dead Poets Society, Good Morning, Vietnam, The Doctor, Billy Bathgate, Honey, I Shrunk the Kids, Honey, I Blew Up the Kid, 3 Ninjas, The Program, Mad Love, Fire Birds and Paradise. Leipzig left to become a producer with PolyGram Entertainment's Interscope Communications in 1993, where he produced films including The Associate, Roommates, Two Much and Dead Silence. He started his own production company called Terra Bella Entertainment in 1999, where he produced films including Titus and I Was a Teenage Faust.

In 2003 Leipzig became president of National Geographic Films, where he supervised acquisition and distribution of films including March of The Penguins, The Story of the Weeping Camel, Amreeka, Kekexili: Mountain Patrol and God Grew Tired of Us; and he produced The Way Back, The Last Lions and Arctic Tale. In October, 2008, National Geographic Films announced $100 million in financing with an equity investment from Abu Dhabi Media Company and a credit facility from JP Morgan.

In 2005, he co-produced March of the Penguins, adapting the French nature film for American market. The adaptation featured narration by Morgan Freeman, a new script, and a new musical score composed by Alex Wurman. The film grossed over $133 million worldwide, becoming the second-highest-grossing documentary of all time and winning the Academy Award for Best Documentary. Leipzig left National Geographic Films in March, 2010.

In 2024, Leipzig produced Sicilian Holiday. Working through his company Credential Media Ventures, Leipzig also oversaw the film's sales and distribution.

As noted by Variety in February 2024, he was working on the documentary Lions of the Sea, directed by Luis Felipe Fernández-Salvador, which depicts the challenges faced by a sea lion orphaned due to illegal fishing.

==== Entertainment Media Partners and CreativeFuture ====
In 2014 he founded Entertainment Media Partners, a film consultancy that also produces films, such as A Plastic Ocean.

From 2015 to 2016, Leipzig was the chief operating officer of CreativeFuture, a non-profit organization that advocates for creative communities, and as of 2018 their senior creative advisor. He also is on the advisory board of the philanthropic social media platform and app, Pixhug.

== Teaching and public speaking ==
Leipzig is on faculty at the University of California Berkeley Haas School of Business, where he has been a lecturer since 2013, teaching in the MBA and Executive Education programs. His courses include Audience-Focused Communication, Mastering Communication, and The Art and Science of Storytelling and Communication From 2013 to 2015, he also served as a part of the faculty at Chapman University's Dodge College of Film and Media Arts.

Leipzig has given two TEDx Talks. "The Real Culture Wars", given at TEDx Fullerton in 2010, and "How to Know Your Life Purpose in 5 Minutes", given in 2013.

== Writing ==
Leipzig has written for American Theatre, Written By, Screen International, and High Performance, and he was the founding editor of Theatre LA magazine. In 2005 Leipzig wrote two articles for The New York Times about how the movie business works for theatrical and home video releases.

Leipzig is also the publisher of Cultural Daily (former Cultural Weekly), a daily digital publication and media project for participatory civic journalism.

== Bibliography ==
- Inside Track for Independent Filmmakers: Get Your Movie Made, Get Your Movie Seen (2013, Macmillan; ISBN 978-0988534209)
- Filmmaking in Action: Your Guide to the Skills and Craft, a comprehensive textbook (2016, Macmillan; ISBN 978-0312616991) - written with Barry S. Weiss and Michael Goldman.

== Filmography ==
Year	Title	Credit	Notes
In Production	Lions of the Sea	Lead producer	Documentary
2024	Sicilian Holiday	Producer	Film
2020	Mentally Al	Executive producer	Documentary
2019	#NoJoke	Executive producer	Documentary
2018	StreetCreative	Producer	Documentary Short
2016	A Plastic Ocean	Producer	Documentary
2011	The Last Lions	Executive producer	Documentary
2010	The Way Back	Executive producer	Film
2007	The Choir	Executive producer	Documentary
2007	Arctic Tale	Producer	Documentary
2002	The Biggest Step	Producer	Film
2002	I Was a Teenage Faust	Executive producer	(TV movie)
1999	Titus	Co-producer	Film
1997	Dead Silence	Executive producer	TV movie
1996	The Associate	Producer	Film
1995	Two Much	Executive producer	Film
1995	Roommates	Executive producer	Film
