= Love Makes Them Crazy =

1946 film

- Directed by: Fernando Cortés
- Written by: Enrique Suárez de Deza (play); Neftali Beltrán; Fernando Cortés
- Produced by: Carlos Luquín
- Starring: Mapy Cortés; Rafael Baledón; Nelly Montiel
- Cinematography: Raúl Martínez Solares
- Edited by: Gloria Schoemann
- Music by: Manuel Esperon
- Production company: Clasa Films Mundiales
- Distributed by: Clasa-Mohme
- Release date: 10 January 1946
- Running time: 100 minutes
- Country: Mexico
- Language: Spanish

Love Makes Them Crazy (Spanish: El amor las vuelve locas) is a 1946 Mexican musical comedy film directed by Fernando Cortés and starring Mapy Cortés, Rafael Baledón and Nelly Montiel. It was shot at the Clasa Studios in Mexico City. The film's sets were designed by the art director Manuel Fontanals.

== Synopsis ==
A spoiled heiress has to adjust to the hardships of everyday life after marrying the family's chauffeur.

== Cast ==
- Mapy Cortés as Carmen
- Rafael Baledón as Julio, Chofer
- Fernando Cortés as Don Ramiro Prendes
- Jorge Reyes as Cupido
- Nelly Montiel as Desdemona
- Eugenia Galindo as Luisa, vendedora de ropa
- Paz Villegas as Doña María Antonieta
- Roberto Cañedo as Roberto, chofer
- Jorge Treviño as Cantante de Ópera
- Consuelo Monteagudo as Josefina Perricholi, soprano
- Pedro Elviro as Cantante de Ópera
- María Gentil Arcos as Dueña de carro chocado
- Beatriz Alatorre as Rosita

== Bibliography ==
- Lozoya, Jorge Alberto. Cine Mexicano. Instituto Mexicano de Cinematografía, 1992.
- Riera, Emilio García. El cine mexicano. Ediciones Era, 1963.
