= Kenny Kerr =

American drag performer

- Born: November 24, 1952; New Jersey, U.S.
- Died: April 28, 2013 (aged 60)
- Occupations: Drag performer, actor
- Years active: 1980s–2013
- Known for: Las Vegas drag performances, celebrity impersonations
- Notable work: The Associate (1996)

Kenny Kerr was an American drag performer.

== Life and career ==
He was born on November 24, 1952 in New Jersey.

Kerr was one of the first female impersonators to work on the Las Vegas Strip. Actively performing as a drag performer since the 1980s, Kerr was known for impersonating celebrities like Barbra Streisand, Joan Rivers and Cher.

In 1996, he played Charlie in the Whoopi Goldberg film The Associate.

Kenny Kerr died on April 28, 2013 at the age of 60.
