= Nelly Montiel =

Argentine film actress (1919–1951)

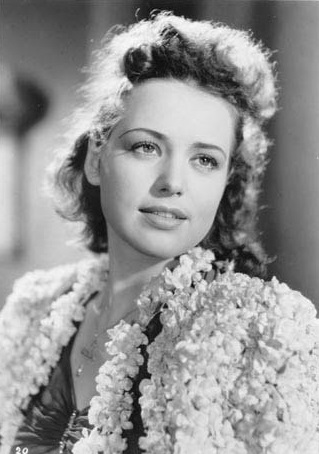
- Montiel in 1939.
- Born: 1919; Argentina
- Died: 14 September 1951 (aged 31–32); Acapulco, Mexico
- Occupation: Actress
- Years active: 1936 - 1951 (film)

Nelly Montiel (1919–1951) was an Argentine film actress. Having made her debut in Argentine films, Montiel moved to Mexico which had the largest Spanish-speaking film industry in the world.

She died in a car accident at the age of thirty two.

== Selected filmography ==
- The Associate (1946)
- Love Makes Them Crazy (1946)
- The Golden Boat (1947)
- If I'm to Be Killed Tomorrow (1947)
- Sing and Don't Cry... (1949)
- Tender Pumpkins (1949)
- Port of Temptation (1951)

== Bibliography ==
- Adrián Pérez Melgosa. Cinema and Inter-American Relations: Tracking Transnational Affect. Routledge, 2012.
