= La pura =

- Directed by: Miguel Rico
- Written by: Luis Domínguez; Ramón Quesada
- Produced by: Xavier Asali
- Starring: Maribel Guardia; Manuel Capetillo hijo
- Cinematography: Xavier Cruz
- Edited by: Ramón Quesada
- Music by: Gerardo García
- Release date: 1994
- Running time: 94 minutes
- Country: Mexico
- Language: Spanish

La pura ("The pure") is a 1994 Mexican film. It stars Maribel Guardia and Manuel Capetillo hijo, directed by Roberto Guinar.

== Cast ==
- Maribel Guardia ... Pura
- Manuel Capetillo hijo ... Rodrigo
- Rafael Buendía ... Don Teófilo
- Queta Lavat ... Doña Antonia Espinoza Corcuera
- Dino García ... Juancho
- Joaquín Cordero ... Padre Bernardo
- Josefina Echánove ... Doña Petra
- Mary Montiel ... Maria
- Raul Gonzalez
- Carlos Rotzinger ... Doctor Soto
- Arturo Alegría
- Paola Morelli ... Adriana
- Jesús Gómez ... Don Pepe
- Jorge Fegán
- María Elena Jasso
