= Aníbal de Mar =

Cuban actor

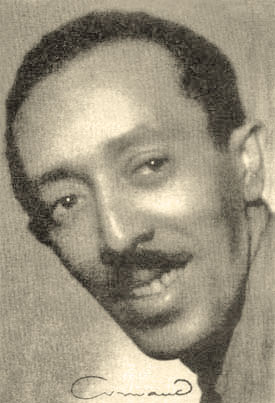

Aníbal de Mar (born Evaristo Simón Domínguez, October 26, 1918 – February 22, 1980) was a Cuban actor who played the character of El Tremendo Juez in the radio show La Tremenda Corte (1942) that even nowadays is still broadcast by several latinoamerican radio stations, forming a funny duo with Leopoldo Fernández (Tres Patines), with whom he joined to make the musical-comedy duo of Pototo and Filomeno.

== Biography ==
Anibal de Mar was born in Yateras Guantanamo province, to the east of Cuba Island. He started his artistic career in 1934 working at all the theaters on the island. He had the ability to embody many characters at the same time accomplishing a show in Santiago de Cuba with Don Pancracio and Felipitos's characters (playing father and son) it was brought to TV in later years in the movie Una Aventura Peligrosa (A dangerous Adventure) (1939) He did two episodes as the Chinese detective Chan Li Po whose author was Félix B. Caignet, also the author of the radionovela El Derecho de Nacer (The right to Be Born) (1948), and it was one of the first big radio hits in Cuba playing the Chinese detective.

He made the first movie with audio filmed in Cuba as Chan Li Po called "La Serpiente Roja" (The Red Snake) in 1937, with supporting actress Pituka de Foronda and actor Carlos Badias and directed by Ernesto Caparros. Among other films he participated on were "Romance Musical" with the contribution of great actor Otto Sirgo, Rosita Fornés and the great actress Enriqueta Sierra, Elsa Valladares, Olga Chorens, Normita Suarez y Rita Montaner, "Hitler soy yo" (Hitler is me) with Adolfo Otero and Julito Diaz, following with "Musica, Mujeres y Piratas" (Music, Women and Pirates) "hotel de Muchachas" (Lady's Hotel) and "Ole!...Cuba"

In 1947 he dubbed into Spanish the Chinese character in "El Pequeño Mr. Jim" in the Metro Goldwyn Mayer in New York city in the United States. He worked in radio stations as CMKD, CMKC, in Santiago de Cuba and in CMQ, COCO, RHC in La Habana.

He died on February 22, 1980, in Miami, Florida, United States.
