= Un largo amor =

Mexican telenovela

- Genre: Telenovela
- Country of origin: Mexico
- Original language: Spanish

Original release
- Network: Telesistema Mexicano
- Release: 1965

Un largo amor is a Mexican telenovela produced by Telesistema Mexicano in 1965.

== Cast ==
- Antonio Bravo
- Enrique García Álvarez
- Queta Lavat
