= Eugenia Galindo =

Spanish film actress

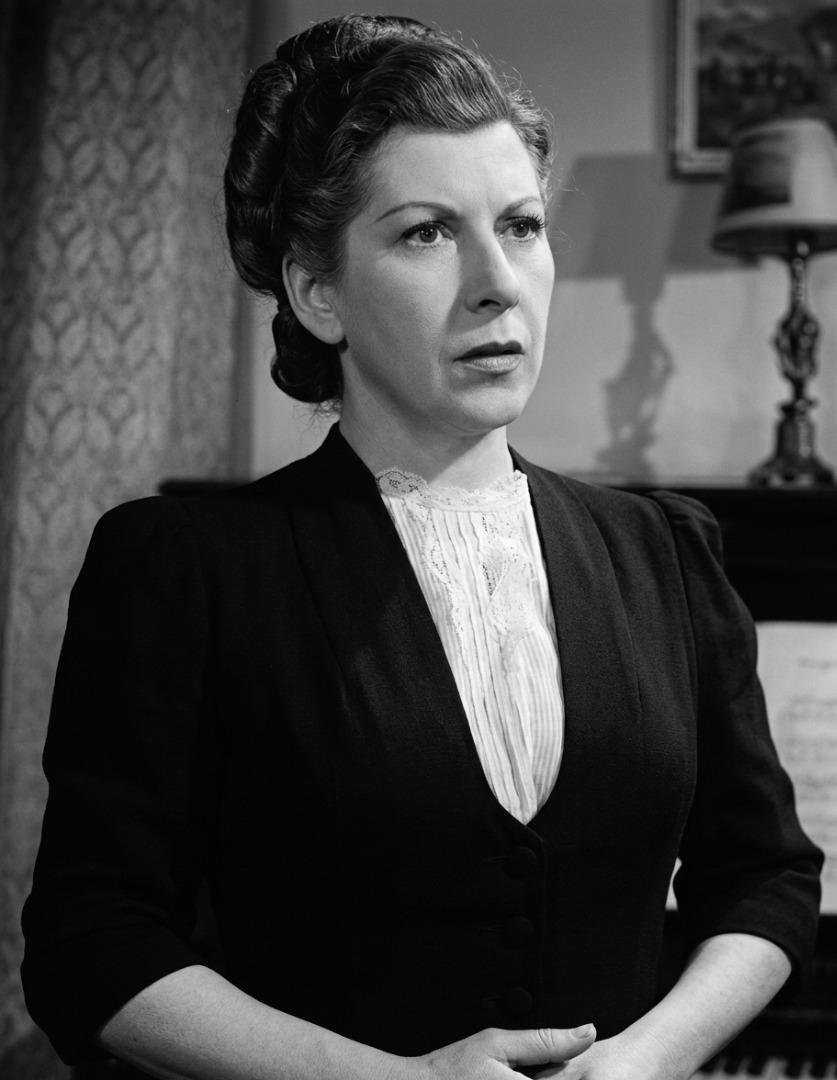
- Eugenia Galindo in Tentación (1943)
- Born: 1897; Madrid, Spain
- Died: 15 November 1968 (aged 70–71); Mexico City, Mexico
- Occupation: Actress
- Years active: 1930–1961 (film)

Eugenia Galindo (1897–1968) was a Spanish stage and film actress. She was active in Mexico during the Golden Age of Mexican Cinema. She was nominated for the Ariel Award for Best Supporting Actress for her role in the 1949 film A Family Like Many Others.

== Selected filmography ==
- Divorced (1943)
- Resurrection (1943)
- El Ametralladora (1943)
- María Eugenia (1943)
- Santa (1943)
- The Escape (1944)
- The Lieutenant Nun (1944)
- Love Makes Them Crazy (1946)
- It's Not Enough to Be a Charro (1946)
- The Noiseless Dead (1946)
- The Prince of the Desert (1947)
- Corner Stop (1948)
- Philip of Jesus (1949)
- Las tandas del principal (1949)
- Mi querido capitán (1950)
- Tenement House (1951)
- El derecho de nacer (1952)
- Las señoritas Vivanco (1959)

== Bibliography ==
- Aviña, Rafael. David Silva: Un campeón de mil rostros. UNAM, 2007.
- Noble, Andrea. Mexican National Cinema. Psychology Press, 2005.
- Poppe, Nicolas. Alton's Paradox: Foreign Film Workers and the Emergence of Industrial Cinema in Latin America. State University of New York Press, 2021.
