= Las tandas del principal =

- Produced by: Fernando de Fuentes
- Release date: 1949
- Country: Mexico
- Language: Spanish

Las tandas del principal ("The Batches of the Principal") is a 1949 Mexican film. It was produced by Fernando de Fuentes.

== Cast ==
- Fernando Soler
- Mapy Cortés
- Luis Aldás
- Fernando Cortés
- Agustín Isunza
- Queta Lavat
- Lupe Inclán
- María Gentil Arcos
- Fanny Schiller
- Max Langler
- Salvador Quiroz
- Guillermo Bravo Sosa
- Eugenia Galindo
- Luis Mussot
- Ignacio Peón
