= Arctic Tale =

- Theatrical release poster
- Directed by: Adam Ravetch; Sarah Robertson
- Written by: Linda Woolverton; Mose Richards; Kristin Gore
- Produced by: Adam Leipzig; Keenan Smart
- Narrated by: Queen Latifah
- Cinematography: Adam Ravetch
- Edited by: Beth Spiegel
- Music by: Joby Talbot
- Production company: National Geographic Films
- Distributed by: Paramount Classics
- Release date: August 17, 2007
- Running time: 97 minutes
- Country: United States
- Language: English
- Box office: $1.8 million

Arctic Tale is a 2007 American documentary film from the National Geographic Society about the life cycle of a walrus and her calf, and a polar bear and her cubs, in a similar vein to the 2005 hit production March of the Penguins, which was adapted for an English-language release by National Geographic. It was directed by Adam Ravetch and Sarah Robertson and is narrated by Queen Latifah. The animal characters named in the movie, "Nanu" the female polar bear and "Seela" the female walrus, are based on composites of animals in their species, as noted at the end of the film.

== Background ==
The footage used in Arctic Tale was filmed over the span of 15 years by married filmmakers Adam Ravetch and Sarah Robertson, along with the National Geographic Natural History Unit and others who record wildlife. They compiled over 800 hours' worth of clips of animals that are typically hard to catch on camera, such as the polar bear and walrus. According to Ravetch, they were "told by scientists that it was very rare for a polar bear to attack a walrus." But his experience made him "realize that polar bears and walruses have quite a lot in common," which is narrated as such in the film.

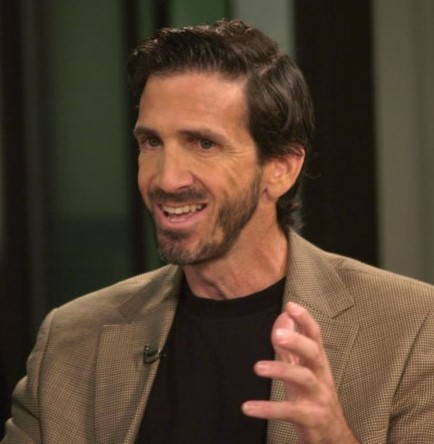
Adam Ravetch, July 2007

== Synopsis ==
At the outset of the movie, Nanu emerges from the cave where she was born along with her brother, just born as well, and their mother. The two polar bear cubs play in the snow for a while until returning to their snow cave. The next day, the cubs start learning from their mother how to survive in the wild. One of the first things they find out by watching their mother is to stay away from grown male polar bears who are apt to kill them.

Seela is shown in the water just after birth with her mother and "Auntie" who helps protect the walrus calf during her early life. For her first life lesson, Seela is taught how to hoist herself onto an ice floe from the water without any help except watching her mother do the same. During this time, Auntie watches for predators. When a male polar bear comes along and starts swimming towards the walruses, Seela and her mother try to get away from him, but must rely on Auntie's help to stave off the polar bear's attack.

Next for the polar bear cubs is learning how to hunt for food. Their mother teaches them how to hunt for a fur seal by stamping down on the ice where she can smell the seal in a small cave underneath. After one failed attempt diving into the water, the mother gets the seal by this stamping method, so her cubs and a fox trailing them can eat the meat. Meanwhile, the young walrus feasts on clams for three days with the rest of its herd on a clam bed they might revisit in another five years.

The two animals then take similar paths. They have to travel because shorter winters mean ice that freezes later and melts sooner, making it harder to survive and eat as the water of Arctic Ocean expands. Male polar bears pose a threat to both of the main creatures, as the cubs have to navigate around him and the walruses try to get away from being prey. After Nanu's brother dies, Nanu has to leave her mother earlier than is customary because of the changing climate conditions, but she still has trouble finding food on her own. Eventually, she finds a male bear who has killed a walrus, identified as Auntie, and aggressively persuades the male to let her share on the feast.

Finally being attracted to animals of the opposite sex, Nanu finds a mate whom she is seen playing with on screen. Seela waits until a particular male walrus's song appeals to her before diving into the water to meet him. Arctic Tale closes with the cycle being complete, as Nanu gives birth to two cubs of her own and Seela gives birth to a female calf.

== Message ==
Throughout the film, narrator Queen Latifah makes allusions to how the rising temperature is affecting the animals in the ice kingdom. A message at the end of the animal footage notes that if the current trend continues, there will be no Arctic ice remaining by the year 2040. During the closing credits, several children talk about how global warming has had a detrimental effect on the animals such as the ones in Arctic Tale as well as the people around the world. Afterwards, the National Geographic "green" website is shown on the screen, as National Geographic is a presenter of the film.

== Reception ==
On the review aggregator website Rotten Tomatoes, 60% of 98 critics' reviews are positive. The website's consensus reads: "Arctic Tale features breathtaking nature cinematography, but is undone by its over-cutesy narration."

== Awards and nominations ==
Arctic Tale was nominated for the Panda Award 2008 which was given at the Wildscreen Festival 2008 in Bristol. It was nominated for the Genesis Award in Los Angeles, "celebrating media celebrating animals".

== Home media ==
This film was released on DVD, HD DVD, and Blu-ray on December 4, 2007.

== Soundtrack ==
The soundtrack album for Arctic Tale includes the following tracks:

- "At the Edge of the World"
  Written and performed by Aimee Mann & Zach Gill
  Plays in the film's opening credits
- "Live Let Live"
  Written by Brian Wilson & Van Dyke Parks
  Performed by Brian Wilson
  Plays in the ending credits
- "Keep On Growing"
  Written by Eric Clapton & Bobby Whitlock
  Performed by Sheryl Crow
  Not featured in the actual movie, although it can be heard playing in the film's theatrical trailer
- "Song of the North (Beneath the Sun)"
  Written and performed by Grant-Lee Phillips (featuring Sara Watkins)
  Featured twice in the film; once when Nanu's family watches two male polar bears wrestle on the ice, and again in the end credits as the children inform the audiences of how to solve global warming
- "Whale Song"
  Written by Jack Irons
  Performed by Pearl Jam
  Not featured in the film
- "Black Wave"
  Written by James Mercer
  Performed by The Shins
  Plays as the polar bears and walruses are struggling to survive in their changing environment
- "Soar"
  Written by Ralph Sall
  Performed by All Too Much
  Not featured in film
- "Itchin"'
  Written and performed by Grant Lee-Phillips
  Plays on Rock Island as the walruses are sunbathing
- "If You Took to Me"
  Written and performed by Matt Costa
  Not featured in film
- "The Great Beyond"
  Written and performed by Aimee Mann
  Not featured in film
- "Underworld"
  Written by Barry Gibb, Ashley Gibb & Stephen Gibb
  Performed by Barry Gibb
  Not featured in film
- "We Are Family"
  Written by Nile Rodgers & Bernard Edwards
  Performed by Sister Sledge
  Played as Seela is introduced to her herd
- An additional song, "Happy Ever After in Your Eyes" by Ben Harper, is featured as the film's closing track as Nanu and Seela give birth to their children, but does not appear on the soundtrack album.
- The Japanese version uses "Miracle Star" by Aoi Teshima as the theme song.
