= Matilde Palou =

Mexican actress

- Born: 4 February 1906; San Felipe, Chile
- Died: 18 October 1970 (aged 64); Mexico City, Mexico
- Occupation: Actress
- Years active: 1934–1970 (film)

Matilde Palou (1906–1970) was a Chilean-born Mexican film actress. She appeared in thirty films during her career.

== Selected filmography ==
- Juarez and Maximillian (1934)
- Narciso's Hard Luck (1940)
- The Eternal Secret (1942)
- The Man Without a Face (1950)
- Susana (1951)
- Tenement House (1951)
- El derecho de nacer (1952)
- Cradle Song (1953)
- La intrusa (1954)

== Bibliography ==
- Hershfield, Joanne. Mexican Cinema/Mexican Woman, 1940-1950. University of Arizona Press, 1996.
