= Félix B. Caignet =

Cuban writer, journalist, and musician

- Born: March 31, 1892; Santa Rita de Burene, San Luis, Cuba
- Died: May 25, 1976 (aged 84); Havana, Cuba
- Occupations: Radio broadcaster, writer, journalist
- Writing career
- Genres: Theatre, children's, music

Félix Benjamín Caignet Salomón, known as Félix B. Caignet, (March 31, 1892 – May 25, 1976) was a Cuban radio writer, broadcaster, poet, novelist, journalist, theater critic, singer and musical composer. He is known as a pioneer of radio broadcasting in Cuba, and as one of the creators of Latin American soap operas.

He was known for his ability to make radio audiences cry. He purposely wrote to make people cry, as he realized that "many were born with pain and misery tattooed on their souls and had so much pain and bitterness in their lives that they never cried for themselves."

Caignet believed that the audiences "took on the feelings of one or another character who was suffering and, without being aware of it, associated their own pain with that of the fictitious figure, and cried with him or her." Félix B. Caignet’s radio dramas were broadcast throughout Central and South America and brought stories of social reality and the "speaking in metaphors" narrative style into popularity.

== Life ==
=== Santiago de Cuba ===
Félix Benjamín Caignet Salomón was born on a coffee plantation in Santa Rita de Burene, San Luis, in the eastern region of Cuba. Poverty forced the family to move to Santiago de Cuba. There, Félix was exposed to the itinerant story tellers who made the streets their home and he became interested in writing, first with sentimental poems. At the age of 20 he became a journalist and began to contribute to the cultural magazine Teatro Alegre.

The newspaper El Diario de Cuba took him on in 1918 and within two years he had his own theatre column, "Vida teatral" (Theater Life) with the byline of Salomón. By 1920 he was also contributing to magazines and newspapers such as El Fígaro, Bohemia and El Sol under a series of bylines. Journalists of the time often protected themselves from retaliation, official or unofficial, through the use of pseudonyms. Caignet at various times signed himself as Doña To Masa (Mrs. All Dough), Miss T. Riosa (Miss T. Rious) and A. L. Khan Ford (Mr. Cam Phor), among many others.

He published a children’s story in 1925 called Las aventuras de Chilín y Bebita en el país azul (The Adventures of Chilín and Bebita in the Blue Country). He continued to write stories for children and, in the early 1930s, broadcast them on the radio on Cuba’s first radio program for children, "Buenas tardes, muchachitos" (Good Afternoon, Boys) on station CMKC of the Grupo Catalán. Some of the stories were invented on the air.

Caignet's suspenseful, episodic story style, learned from the itinerant story tellers of his childhood, was well suited to radio. He adapted "The Adventures of Chilín and Bebita in the Blue Country" as a serial for radio called "Chilín y Bebita" and would conduct his own listener surveys by going out into the streets to ask people about the show. From this he got an idea of how many people listened to the program and what they thought of the plot developments. By concentrating on the parts of the story people liked best, he increased the popularity of the series and changed the name from "Chilín y Bebita" to "Chilín, Bebita y el enanito Coliflor" (Chilín, Bebita and Midget Cauliflower).

Also a composer of children’s songs, his song "El ratoncito Miguel" (Mickey Mouse) was used as a fundraiser in the fight against the regime of President Gerardo Machado. The song was performed several times at the Teatro Rialto in Santiago de Cuba in 1932 until it was banned and Caignet arrested. Imprisoned for three days, he was released when his fans, including children, demonstrated outside the Moncada garrison. Caignet enjoyed great success in 1934 with the detective dramas of "Chan Li Po", based on the American Charlie Chan movies, broadcast on CMKD of the Palacio de la Torre. Caignet acted as narrator for the series. The first episode, "La serpiente roja" (The Red Snake), featured Aníbal de Mar and Nenita Viera.

=== Havana ===
Deciding to move to Havana, he took a job with millionaire Desiderio Parreño, who hired him to paint stones, called "cromolitos", for his estate in San Miguel de los Baños, Matanzas while he looked for work in the capital. He pitched his Chan Li Po series, but the radio stations didn’t feel it would appeal to the Havana audience.

The only work he could find was reciting and singing with radio station CMQ, either alone or in duets with Rita Montaner or Carmelina Pérez. Eventually Radiodifusión O´Shea broadcast a test airing of "Chan Li Po y la Serpiente Roja," narrated by Marcelo Agudo and starring Mercedes Díaz and Carlos Badías. It became the most listened to program of the time.

Seven months later, Caignet was hired by the firm Ypana and moved to Argentina. Returning to Cuba in 1938, he put a new season of Chan Li Po on the air with COCO Radio. The program ran with great success until 1941. Caignet’s other dramas and adaptations also drew large audiences, such as "Aladino y la lámpara maravillosa" (Aladdin and the Wonderful Lamp, 1941), El ladrón de Bagdad (The Thief of Bagdad, 1946), Peor que las víboras (Worse than Vipers, 1946), all broadcast by RHC Cadena Azul.

Circuito CMQ S.A. aired El precio de una vida (The Price of a Life, 1944), Ángeles de la calle (Street Angels, 1948), Pobre juventud (Poor Youth, 1957) and La madre de todos (The Mother of Us All, 1958).

Circuito CMQ S.A. also produced Caignet’s most popular drama, "El derecho de nacer" (The Right To Be Born) recounting the sad tales of Albertico Limonta and Mamá Dolores. Making its debut on April 1, 1948, with stars María Valero and Carlos Badías, it quickly displaced "Novela del aire" (Novel in the air) of RHC Cadena Azul as the most popular program. RHC Cadena Azul had been offered "El derecho de nacer" (The Right To Be Born), but turned it down due to the controversial subject matter.

=== Film ===
Following on his radio success, some of Caignet’s best known stories were made into films, "La Serpiente Roja", 1937, was the first Cuban film with sound. "El derecho de nacer" was filmed in 1952 by Mexican director Zacarías Gómez Urquiza, starring Jorge Mistral and Gloria Marín. Subsequent films based on Caignet’s stories included Ángeles de la calle (Street Angels), Los que no deben nacer (The ones who should not be born), La mujer que se vendió (The woman who betrayed), Mujer o fiera (Woman or beast), Morir para vivir (To die to live) and La fuerza de los humildes (The force of the humble).

=== Songs ===
Of Félix B. Caignet’s many popular songs, the two best known are Frutas del Caney, recorded by the Venezuelan combo Dimensión Latina, and Te odio (I Hate You) sung by the Trío Matamoros and by Rita Montaner and Barbarito Diez with Antonio María Romeu’s band. The song was covered (in translation) in the US by Bing Crosby. The popular children's song "El ratoncito Miguel" (Mickey Mouse) was also written by Felix.

=== Poems and novels ===
Félix B. Caignet also wrote poems and novels gaining him the reputation one of the originators of the afrocubanista (Afro-Cubanist) movement as well as writing a number of popular songs.

=== Criticism ===
Although immensely popular with audiences, Caignet was harshly treated by critics who condemned his work for its mixed metaphors, for ridiculous plots, and tear-jerking sentimentality. He was also known to charge more than any other radio personality, which gave rise to envy amongst his colleagues.

=== Influence ===
Félix B. Caignet was an influence on Colombian writer and Nobel Prize Winner Gabriel García Márquez.

== Death ==
Félix B. Caignet died in Havana on May 25, 1976 at 84, for natural causes. His body was buried in Havana until his remains were moved to Santiago de Cuba in 1992 in order to honor his wish to be buried near his parents.
