= Pío Ballesteros =

Spanish writer, producer and director

- Born: 1 April 1919; Madrid, Spain
- Died: 1995 (aged 75); Madrid, Spain
- Occupation(s): Writer, producer and director

Pío Ballesteros (1 April 1919 - 1995) was a Spanish writer, producer and director. He only directed three films: Consultaré a Mister Brown (1946), Facultad de Letras (1949) and El alma de la copla (1965). José Luis López Vázquez worked with Ballesteros and Enrique Herreros as assistant director.

== Filmography ==
=== As director ===
- Viaje a Sudáfrica (1969)
- El alma de la copla (1965)
- Facultad de letras (1952)
- Consultaré a Mister Brown (1946)

=== As producer ===
- Rififí en la ciudad (1963)

=== As writer ===
- Málaga, vino y sol (1974)
- Entrega de la bandera a la policía armada (1970)
- Guadalajara, tierra de lagos (1970)
- Viaje a Sudáfrica (1969)
- Coronación imperial (1968)
- Feria del Campo 1968 (1968)
- Modas 69 (1968)
- Sitges (1968)
- Vamos a La Rioja (1968)
- El signo de la Navidad (1967)
- Cerrado por asesinato (1964)
- The Sadistic Baron von Klaus (1963)
- Vampiresas 1930 (1962)
- Una isla con tomate (1962)
- Don Lucio y el hermano Pío (1960)
- Y después del cuplé (1959)
- Aventuras de Esparadrapo (1949)
- Consultaré a Mister Brown (1946)
- Misión blanca (1946)
