= René Gainville =

Hungarian-born French screenwriter and film director (1931–2014)

- Born: René Jacques Froc de Géninville; 2 December 1931; Budapest, Hungary
- Died: August 5, 2014 (aged 82); Paris, France
- Citizenship: French
- Occupations: Film director and film producer, screenwriter and actor
- Spouse: Edith Vignaud (stage name: Anne Vernon)

René Gainville (Budapest, 2 December 1931– Paris, 5 August 2014) was a Hungarian-born French screenwriter and film director, film producer and actor.

== Biography ==
Gainville was born René Jacques Froc de Géninville on 2 December 1931 in Budapest, Hungary..After World War II he moved with his family to Paris where he began his film career.

He married the actress Edith Vignaud, whose stage name was Anne Vernon, and they had a daughter.

He died on 5 August 2014 in Paris.

== Filmography ==
=== Director ===
- 1964: Tambi (short film)
- 1964: Libérez-nous du mal (short film)
- 1964: Le père (short film)
- 1966: L'Homme de Mykonos
- 1968: Le Démoniaque / The Woman Is a Stranger
- 1969: Un jeune couple / A Young Couple
- 1970: Alyse et Chloé / Alyse and Chloé
- 1973: Le Complot
- 1974: Le Bon Samaritain (TV)
- 1975: Le Pensionnat et ses inimitiés (as Catherine Balogh)
- 1975: ... Et tu n'auras d'autres adversaires que toi (TV)
- 1979: L'associé / The Associate

=== Assistant director ===
- 1965: Mission spéciale à Caracas / Mission to Caracas

=== Producer ===
- 1966: L'Homme de Mykonos
- 1968: Le Démoniaque
- 1970: Alyse et Chloé / Alyse and Chloé
- 1973: Le Complot
- 1975: Le Pensionnat et ses inimitiés
- 1979: L'associé / The Associate
- 1996: The Associate (continued from L'Associé)
- 2001: Mikor siel az oroszlán? (Hungarian)

=== Screenwriter ===
- 1966: L'Homme de Mykonos
- 1968: Le Démoniaque
- 1979: L'Associé
- 1996: The Associate

=== Actor ===
- 1989: Thank You Satan (André Farwagi's film)
- 1996: Kisváros / Tengerparti végjáték (TV, Hungarian)
