= Leopoldo Fernández (Tres Patines) =

Cuban comedian

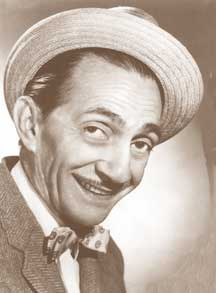
- Leopoldo Augusto Fernández Salgado, alias Tres Patines
- Born: 26 December 1904; Calimete, Provincia Matanzas, Cuba
- Died: 11 November 1985 (aged 80); Miami, Florida, U.S.
- Occupation(s): Actor, comedian, performer
- Spouses: Maria Alfonso; Mimí Cal; Vilma Carbia
- Children: 9

Leopoldo Augusto Fernández Salgado (26 December 1904 – 11 November 1985) was a Cuban comedian, known as Jose Candelario Tres Patines or Pototo, maker and performer of the radio and TV program La Tremenda Corte, which is still presented on radio and offered in CD, VHS and DVD.

== Biography ==
Although born in Calimete, Provincia Matanzas, Fernández's birth was registered in the city of Güines, about 30 miles south of Havana. At an early age the family moved from Güines to Havana. He left school to work and help his family since he was young. He delivered bread; after, he was a telegraphist, tobacco maker, and fortune-teller until 1926, when he founded a theatrical company with some of his friends. That same year he was hired to go on a national tour with Blanquita Gómez. When the tour was over he went back to his hometown and returned to his company; he traveled to Havana. His performances took him to countries such as Puerto Rico, Venezuela, Colombia, Peru, Panama and Dominican Republic where people listened daily to La Tremenda Corte.

Fernández's most successful series was La Tremenda Corte, launched in 1941. He created the character "Pototo", who appeared on television in El show de Pototo y Filomeno. When Fidel Castro came to power in 1959, Fernández was exiled to Miami where he continued performing in theaters, and where he died in 1985. He was survived by his children Miguel, Leopoldo 'Pucho' Fernandez, who also became a well known comedian, Lenia, Leopoldo 'Polito', Leonel, Leovardo, Leonora, Leonardo and Leonor.

== Filmography ==
- Hotel de Muchachas (1951)
- Olé Cuba (1957)
- Las Vírgenes de la Nueva Ola (1969)
- El Profeta Mimi (1973)
- Tres Patines en Acción (1982)

== Discography ==
- Pototo & Filomeno (Puchito, 1956)
- Yo Pico un Pan (Puchito, 1957)

== See also ==
- Aníbal de Mar
- CMQ (Cuba)
