= La Tremenda Corte =

Cuban radio comedy program

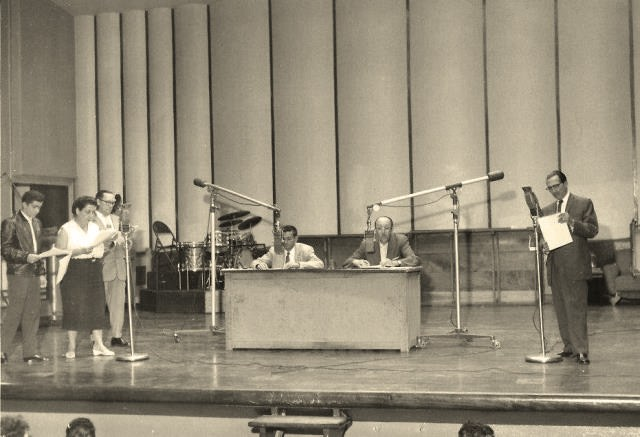
Live radio tramsmission of La Tremenda Corte in one of the Radio CMQ Studio. From left to right: Erdwin Fernández, Mimí Cal, Adolfo Otero, Miguel Ángel Herrera, Aníbal de Mar y Leopoldo Fernández.

La Tremenda Corte was a radio comedy show produced from the Radiocentro CMQ Building in Havana, Cuba. The scripts were written by Cástor Vispo, a Spaniard who became a Cuban citizen. The show was aired nonstop from 1942 to 1961. Later, the format of the show was adapted for a TV sitcom in Monterrey, Mexico, however, only three and a half seasons were produced from 1966 to 1969.

== History ==
=== Origins ===
Cástor Vispo was born in A Coruña, Spain. He left his hometown at the age of 18, shortly after the Spanish Civil War broke out, to join his family in Cuba. While working at the El Universal newspaper, Vispo used his free time to write. His stories were closely related to the Cuban culture of the period, encompassing written press, theater and Cuban radio.

== Popularity ==
“La Tremenda Corte”, was the work of the prolific comedy writer Cástor Vispo, a work which he fused with speech and Cuban folk psychology. Both Vispo as the production team were given the task of finding local comedians who would shed a humorous light, in 1941 (during WWII) and help people to forget the hardships of that time. Soon they found Leopoldo Fernández (Tres Patines), a talented comedian who was already recognized in radio spots and theatre, and his inseparable friend, Anibal de Mar. The duo had already achieved popularity as the comedy duo Pototo y Filomeno, and they would bring parts of their act into the new show. The rest of the cast came from tests with other less well-known comedians, but equally outstanding.

=== RHC radio ===
The program began broadcasting on radio station RHC-Cadena Azul on January 7, 1942. It was owned by Amado Trinidad Velasco since 1941 (RHC belonged to the famous cigarette company Trinidad and Brothers).

In 1947, “La Tremenda Corte” like several other programs of its time, was transferred to rival station CMQ Radio advertisers and sponsors, seeking greater competitive advantage. The programs were broadcast live back then, three times per week from Monday to Friday at 8:30 pm and were sponsored by a firm of perfumery and soaps.

=== CMQ Radio ===
La Tremenda Corte aired uninterrupted from 1942 to 1961 (first RHC Cadena Azul and later at QMC), and its sole writer was Vispo. Despite such strenuous work for his imagination, Vispo always managed to pull through during this period. Over 360 shows are estimated to have been recorded, many of which are still heard on radio, but a few such episodes have never left Cuba and little is therefore known about them. Of all these missing radio shows were recorded at station CMQ in Havana, between 1947 and 1961, no one knows how many still survive, and they are considered rare and invaluable for fans and collectors of the series. In the peak of their success, the performances of the cast were taken to countries such as Puerto Rico, Venezuela, Colombia, Peru, Panama and the Dominican Republic, where they were acclaimed.

=== TV series ===
In 1955 the program received a second wind, becoming the TV space comedy “The show of Pototo & Filomeno” CMQ through TV, where Leopoldo Fernandez (“Pototo”) made a very similar to “Tres Patines” with again his teammate Anibal de Mar (Filomeno).

The space consisted of skits and songs with orchestral music, a forerunner of its kind on the island of Cuba. Its success prompted the couple's two music recordings and a second film (“Olé Cuba!”) In 1957. The show was introduced in the Sierra and the Montmartre cabarets in Havana.

All this occurred parallel to his work with “La Tremenda Corte”, but much of the public still identified with their radio characterizations.

=== Radio show cancelled ===
Beginning in 1960, production changed drastically as a result of the Cuban Revolution headed by Fidel Castro.

The show had been adapted previously to play in local theatres to some controversy, since the actors (Leopoldo Fernández especially) were vocal political critics both off and on stage.

Castro's regime, with its rigid Marxist tendency in those years, showed its displeasure with the existence of comedy shows on the broadcast media, especially when political leaders started to become the butt of jokes.

1960 and 1961 were particularly difficult for the cast, as the government began sending sympathizers to chant Communist slogans and disrupt the performances.

Then, in 1961, the Cuban government placed all theater, radio and TV troupes under the purview of the state Censorship Commission.

Fernández was arrested over a shooting in a performance and had to serve a 27-day house arrest sentence for which no further explanation was offered.

After his release, Fernández is said to have made a short comic piece where he played “Pototo” while he and another actor reviewed a file of Cuban presidents' photos to install them on the wall. The other player showed a photo of Fulgencio Batista, and Fernández said to him: “Throw this one away.” The other actor continued showing different pictures to Pototo's unchanging reply: – “Throw this one away too…” Finally, the assistant picked up a photo of Fidel Castro. Leopoldo looked at it, showed it to the audience and then went to the wall as he said with his characteristic ironic humor: – “Allow me — I want to hang this one myself”.

The joke, which spread far and wide, was usually followed by the statement that this line had caused Fernandez's arrest and his self-exile from Cuba that same year. However, this story was later denied in Miami by Fernández himself, who, on hearing it from an alleged theater hand present at that performance, corrected the storyteller with visible displeasure and said: "Gentlemen, had I done and said those things, I would not be here to tell you the story".

The Cuban authorities finally shut down both the stage version of La Tremenda Corte and Pototo y Filomeno in Cuba, and in early 1962, the Cuban government seized the Radiocentro CMQ Building and cancelled all comedy shows that were on air.

This caused the main cast of “La Tremenda Corte” (with the exception of the production team, including Cástor Vispo) to leave Cuba that year for Miami, never to return.

The self-exile was driven by economic reasons, never by ideological differences. In fact, none of the cast team expressed any political views and they decided to avoid referring to the events that were happening in Cuban society, even if they were living in a foreign country.

In those days, actors did not receive income from re-runs of the programs, as they do today. For this reason, Abel Mestre, who had been executive of company CMQ before it was expropriated by the Cuban government, bought many of the chapters of La Tremenda Corte for a truly laughable sum. Later, he offered them for sale to many of the main Latin American radio stations of those years. The sale value was estimated in those years in $20 U.S. per episode, or more than $7,000 U.S. All of the episodes which recorded are still conserved, and many are available on YouTube. The originals are worth an exorbitant sum today.

== For television ==
=== Mexico ===
The radio show would return to life in Mexico in the mid-1960s when Monterrey-based radio station XEFB-AM began transmitting episodes recorded in Cuba. The radio broadcasts were warmly welcomed by the audience.

The success motivated a TV adaptation, and Televisión Independiente de México (Cadena TIM) broadcast the first episodes of the small-screen series in 1966 via Monterrey Channel 6 (XET-TV 6) and Mexico City Channel 8 (XHTM Canal 8). Cadena TIM had by then a superb show schedule, having hired the best Cuban creative talents of the time.

The TV series, however, also suffered from the limitations of the age, like the painted-cardboard scenery and the grainy picture afforded by the rudimentary black-and-white video equipment. The last season featured live audiences, earning the show greater credibility and underscoring the performers' improvisational skills and stage presence.

La Tremenda Corte was one of the first TV comedy shows exported from Mexico to various Latin American countries.

Of the original radio performers, only Leopoldo Fernández (who also wrote the scripts in the absence of Vispo) and Aníbal de Mar reprised their roles, which were central and irreplaceable to the plot. Mimí Cal (Nananina) and Adolfo Otero (Rudecindo), two regulars from the original series, by then exiled in Miami, declined the offer to participate. Their roles were taken by Norma Zúñiga (as Nananina) and Florencio Castello (Rudecindo).

The rest of the cast were Cuban and Mexican actors mostly unknown to audiences because the station was unwilling to pay high salaries. Some, like a young Alfonso Zayas (as Casimiro, a very occasional character), first acted on TV on the show. This was also the case of Tonina Jackson, a wrestler active in the 1950s and 1960s, who also acted in a few episodes.

The TV show was cancelled in mid-1969, due to unsustainable production costs and a lack of strong sponsors coupled with the obvious technical limitations. The fourth season was left unfinished, despite the show's success elsewhere in the continent and the performers' efforts to keep it on the air.

Meanwhile, Leopoldo Fernández was cast in the Mexican film Las vírgenes de la nueva ola (1969, Fernando Cortés), filmed in Miami. This was his first color film — and his first ever without Aníbal de Mar.

=== Peru ===
In mid-1969 Panamericana Televisión (Channel 5 Peru) bought all 260 filmed chapters of and the rights to La Tremenda Corte and later hired Fernández to lead El Guardia Tres Patines, a spin-off of the original show. Fernández was cast in the title role, a clueless police officer of Caribbean flavor, and Antonio Salim as his boss, Sergeant Bonifacio Palomino, along with other Peruvian comedians like Jorge Montoro and Anita Saravia. The show was very short-lived, failing to garner wider distribution or much importance abroad.

One final adaptation for Panamericana was the obscure, less fortunate Tres Patines en su salsa (1970), of which little recorded matter survives. Fernández quit Lima after this.

== International relevance ==
La tremenda corte has been one of the most widely listened radio shows in many American countries; it has been so successful, it remains on air even today on many radio stations, mainly for audiences in Mexico, Peru, Panama, Costa Rica, the Caribbean (particularly in the Dominican Republic), Florida in the United States and the rest of the Americas; further, also the TV versions are still transmitted in certain channels of Mexico, Peru, Ecuador and Panama.

The head of the Dominican Republic's Ministry of Education attempted to get the show taken off the air, concerned that children listening to the show would adopt Tres Patines' dialect. The attempt was unsuccessful, and he soon found himself dismissed from his post following public outcry.

Miami's Mega television Canal 22, announced that from January 15, 2007, would have a daily emission of the series, in south Florida. In Puerto Rico, the WPAB radio network transmits two episodes weekdays from 1:00 pm to 2:00 pm, retaining a considerable audience.

== Tributes ==
In 1998 Cuban comedians did a tribute to the show within the program "¿Y tú de qué te ríes? (And what are you laughing at?) Of Cubavision, and took to the air a remake starring, among others, by Ulises Toirac as Trespatines, Carlos Otero as the Judge, Geonel Martin as Secretary, and Edith Massola as Nananine. This sketch was the closing of the program and had enormous popularity. Later they tried to convert it into a regular program, and finally, in 2001, it was only possible by making some changes that removed the original names, still closed to large scale and became Chivichana Trespatines (a kind of rustic skateboard Cuban children), the plaintiffs were replaced by new characters (Amado Fiel del Toro, Marieta Pozo Alegre, the professor Pepe Rillo and Cuqui la Mora), and the name remained as a ¿Jura decir la verdad? (Do you swear to tell the truth?).

Set in the Republican era, but early is contextualized in modern times subtextual level, with unprecedented sharp social criticism (the character Cabo Pantera, appeared in the second season, has been the only satirical allusion to the current police throughout the history of radio and television post-revolutionary), a weekly comedy show is hailed as one of the most popular in the history of Cuban television (directed by Ulises himself Toirac and Gustavo Fernández-Larrea), and which always appears at the beginning, the poster: Tribute to Tremenda Corte.

== Actors and characters ==
Radio version produced in Havana between 1942 and 1961.

- Leopoldo Fernandez (José Candelario Tres Patines)
- Aníbal de Mar (el Tremendo Juez)
- Manuela "Mimí" Cal (Luz María Nananina)(Nananina and Tres Patines had been married at different times in the show, as had their actors, and references to their marriage occasionally appeared in episodes.)
- Adolfo Otero (Rudecindo Caldeiro y Escobiña)(According to legend, Otero was on his way to the funeral of fellow Tremenda Corte castmember Julito Diaz, when he was run over and killed by Diaz's own funeral procession.)
- Miguel Angel Herrera (El Secretario de la Tremenda Corte)(At the time of Fernandez's death, Herrera was the only surviving cast member. He has since died.)
- Julito Diaz (El Secretario de la Tremenda Corte #2, Don Hipólito del Queque y Estupiñan)

Supporting Characters:

- Erdwin Fernández (“Simplicio Bobadilla and Comejaiba”)
- Wilfredo Fernández (“Federico “Perico” Jovellanos and Campoflorido”)
- Reynaldo Miravalles (“Leoncio Garrotín and Rompecocos”)
- “Luz Rosa Matraca del Valle”
- “Don Olegario Cascarillas and Pinotea”
- “Mr. Robert Two Base and One Strike” (American)
- “Inés María Fernández”
- “Don Hipólito del Queque and Estupiñán”
- “Guampampiro Talanquera del Potrero” (guajiro)
- “Cheo Guayabera”
- “Sindulfo Roqueta”
- “Dr. Vitamino Pildorita”
- “Severo Calderilla”
- “Don Catalino Talanquera del Potrero”
- “Monsieur Gabán and Malapolán” (dressmaker)
- “Excelentismo Mr. Don Nico Pantalon” (Ambassador of the Principality of Jambalán)
- “Bonifacio Batilongo” (Nananina's cousin)
- “Petronilo Talanquera” (Nananina's half cousin)
- “Darío Nervo Espronceda and Garcia Lorca de Bodeler” (poet)
- “Albino Blanco de Meza” (Cantina owner)
- "Ching Chong Chow (owner of a Chinese laundry)
- "Bertoldo Edmundo Melones y Dieta" (Art aficionado, "Dañosperjuicidio")

In the television version produced in Monterrey between 1966 and 1969:

- Leopoldo Fernández (José Candelario Tres Patines)
- Aníbal de Mar (the Tremendous Judge)
- Norma Zúñiga (“Luz María Nananina”)
- Florencio Castelló (“Rudecindo Caldeiro and Escobiña”)
- Alonso Brown (the first “Secretary” – only in the first season)
- Ricardo Barroeta (the “Secretary”, also made other occasional characters)
- Raul “Cascarita” Salcedo (originally “Secretary”, soon made other participation with other characters, in particular with the one of “Heliotropo Flores del Rosal” and “don Abundio”)

Among the rest of the televising cast were:

- Marco de Carlo (“Patagonio Tucumán and Bandoneón “)
- Leopoldo Fernández Jr (“Polito Abril and Mayo”)
- Eny González (“Ángela Toribia Mercado”)
- Luis Manuel Pelayo (“Feliz Amargado or Happy Bitter”)
- Delia Garda (“Julieta Tacoronte”, “Blanca Flor de la Montaña or White Flower of the Mountain”, “Asuncion Cordero”)
- “Tonina Jackson” (the “mechanic” and other occasional roles)
- Ana Marty (“Cucucita”, “Amaranza de los Sitios”)
- Alfonso Zayas (“Casimiro”)

== Plots and characters ==
The program presents a court where absurd situations arise, which always conclude in the Court of La Tremenda Corte, of no specified location (although some clues might say Habana). They are crimes in which Jose Candelario “Tres Patines” has made victim to Rudecindo or Nananina with some of his thefts, deceits or knavery, and these demand him before a judge in that correctional court. The daily subjects turn on misunderstandings that Tres Patines causes matching of words, always distorting for his benefit the double meaning that some phrases could have. Tres Patines in most cases inadvertently reveal his malicious intent. In one famous sketch, he pretend that he sells a parrot "speaking exceedingly". When the customer complains that the parrot doesn't speak, he explains to the judge that the one who speaks exceedingly is himself, Tres Patines, not the parrot. Meanwhile, the judge is a hypochondriac who is always seeing doctors and discussing remedies. Everyone is concerned about his health since the worse he is feeling the more everyone in the courtroom would be slapped with fines and jail time.

== Anecdotes ==
The expression "A la Reja" (“To the bars!”) —typical of Tres Patines whenever they called him to appear, it was said in Cuba to those who were in prison already, in other words, was locked up in his cell, and in addition people came to look for him, could be a relative, his lawyer, or whoever. Then, so that the prisoner approached the bars because they wanted to talk to him, it was said to him. —“Fulano of so… to the bars! ” -. This gives to understand that the character basically spend most his time as a condemned in jail.

The anecdotes of Tres Patines always leave in doubt the language of Cervantes that never says the words as they are. In fact, the success of his character, lay in the easy way he used the language for his own benefit.

== See also ==
- Radiocentro CMQ Building
