= Jenaro Prieto =

Chilean journalist and writer (1889–1946)

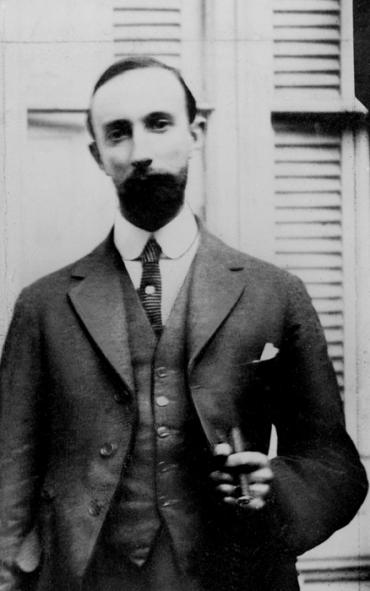
- Born: 5 August 1889; Santiago, Chile
- Died: 5 March 1946 (aged 56); Chile
- Other name: Genaro Prieto

Jenaro Prieto (1889–1946) was a Chilean journalist, writer and politician. He served as a member of the National Congress of Chile for the Conservative Party during the 1930s.

Amongst his best known works as a writer is the novel The Partner (1928) which has been turned into several films.

== Bibliography ==
- Salvatore Bizzarro. Historical Dictionary of Chile. Scarecrow Press, 2005.
