= San Francisco Bay Area =

Region in California, United States

Coordinates: 37.81°N 122.37°W

San Francisco Bay Area San Jose–San Francisco–Oakland, CA CSA
- Region and combined statistical area
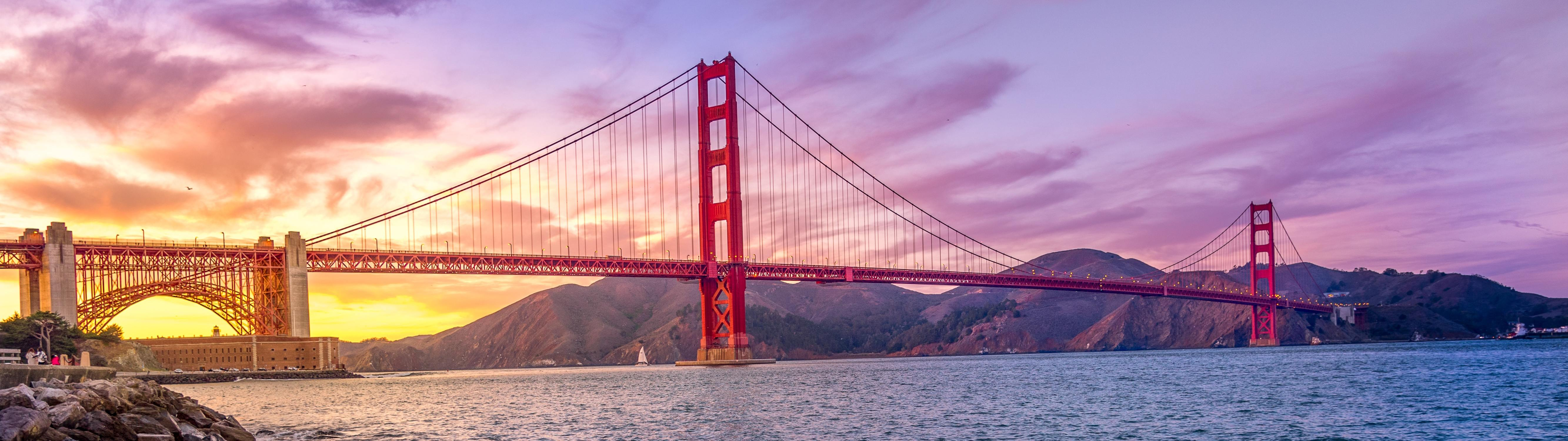
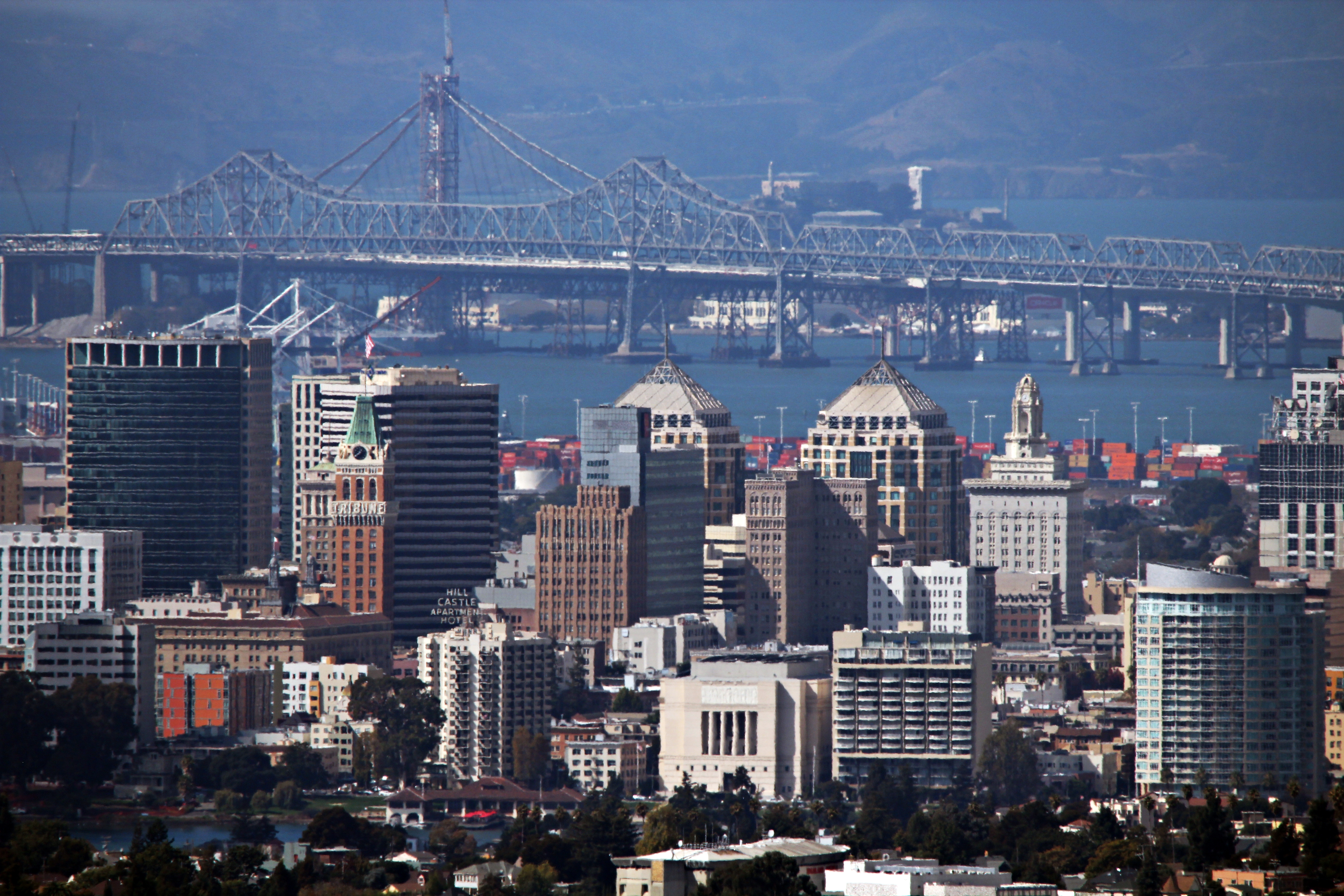
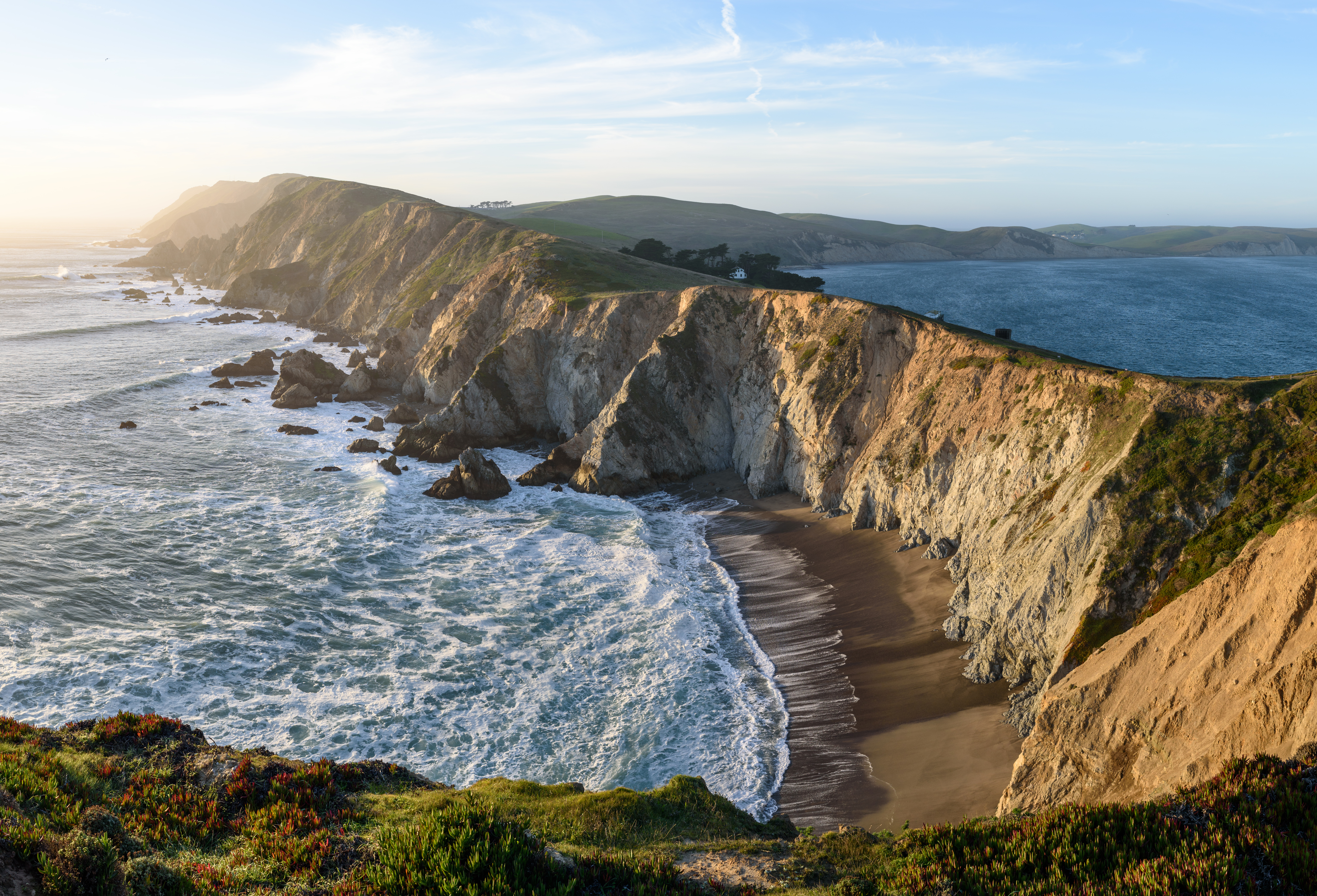
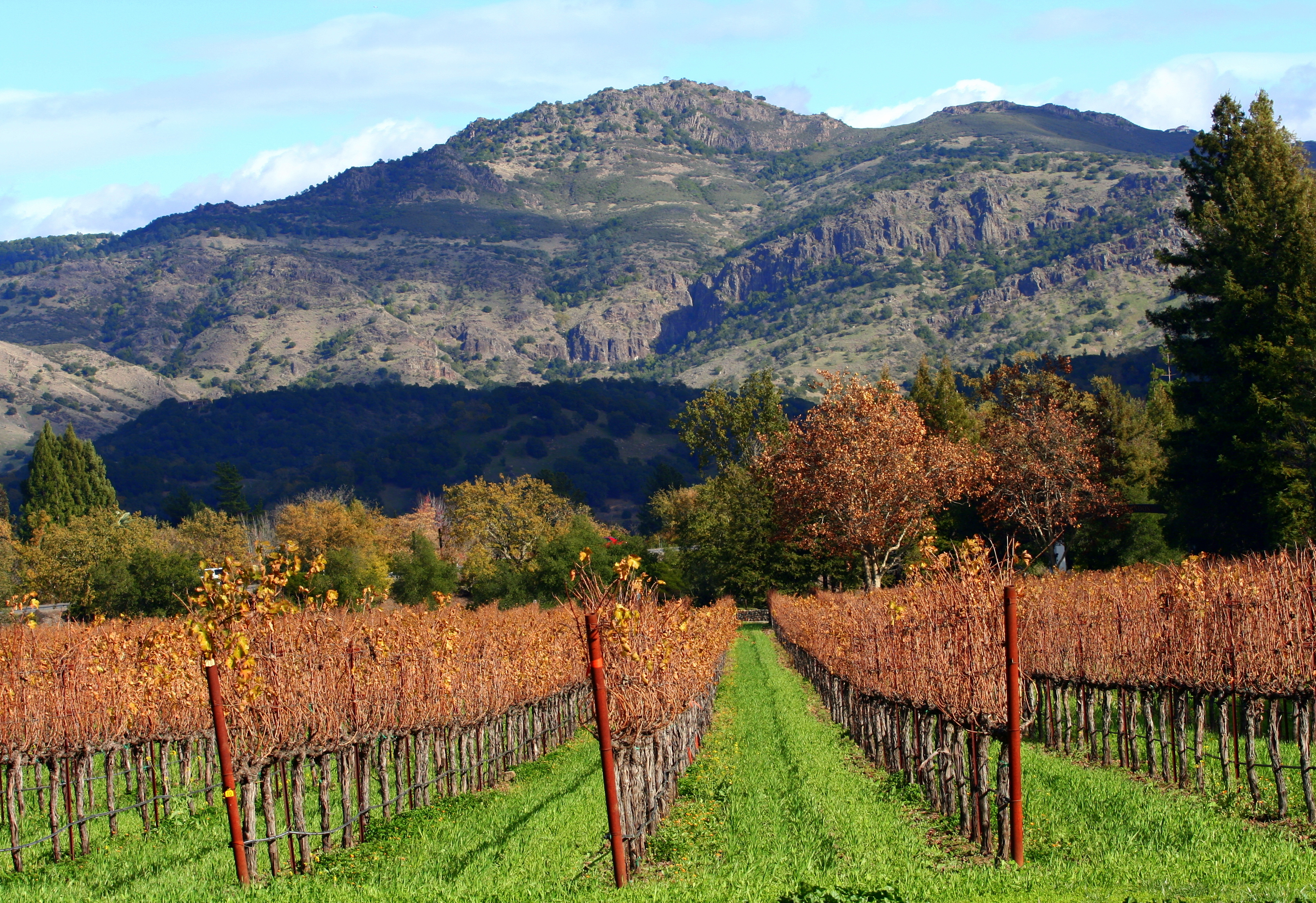
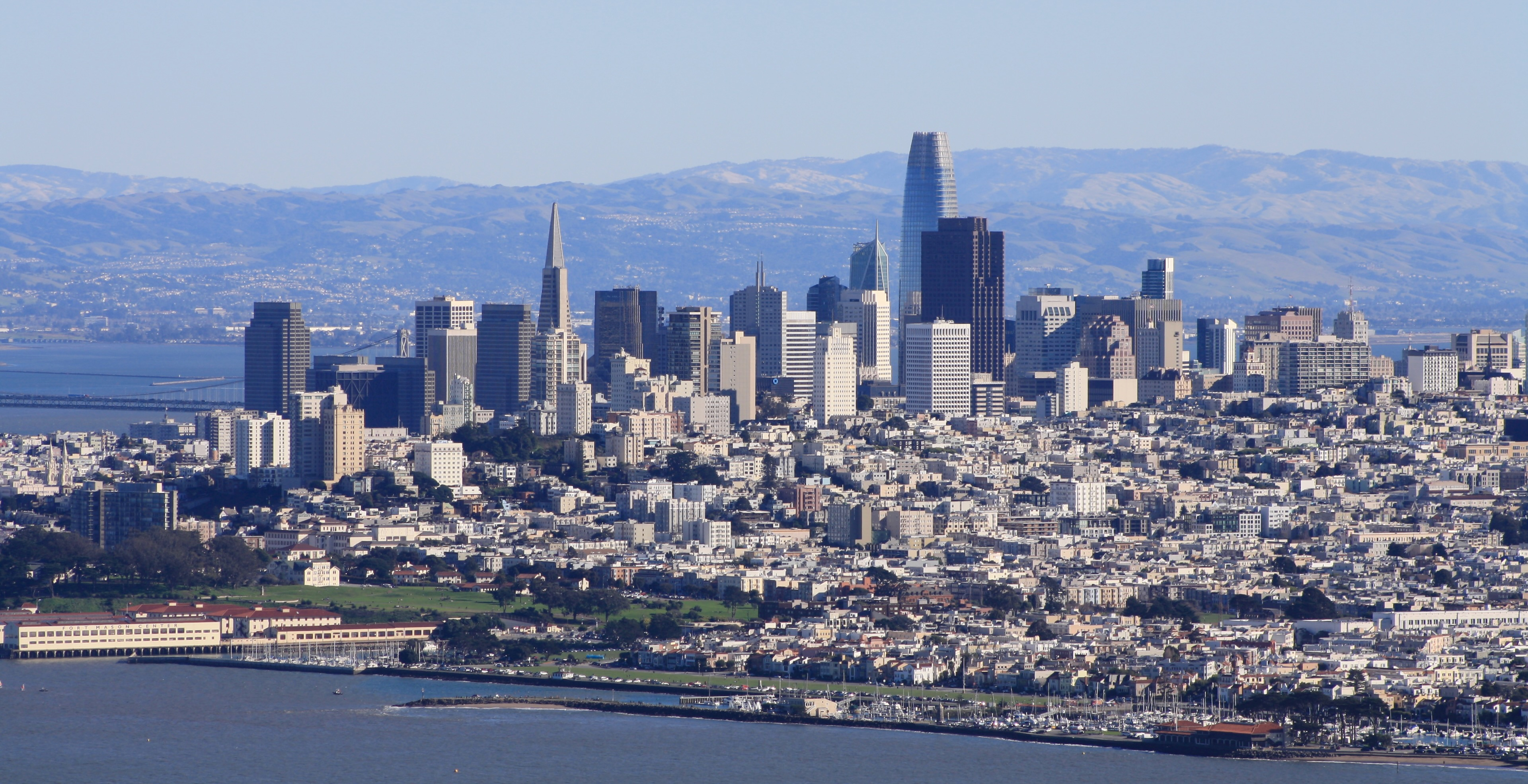
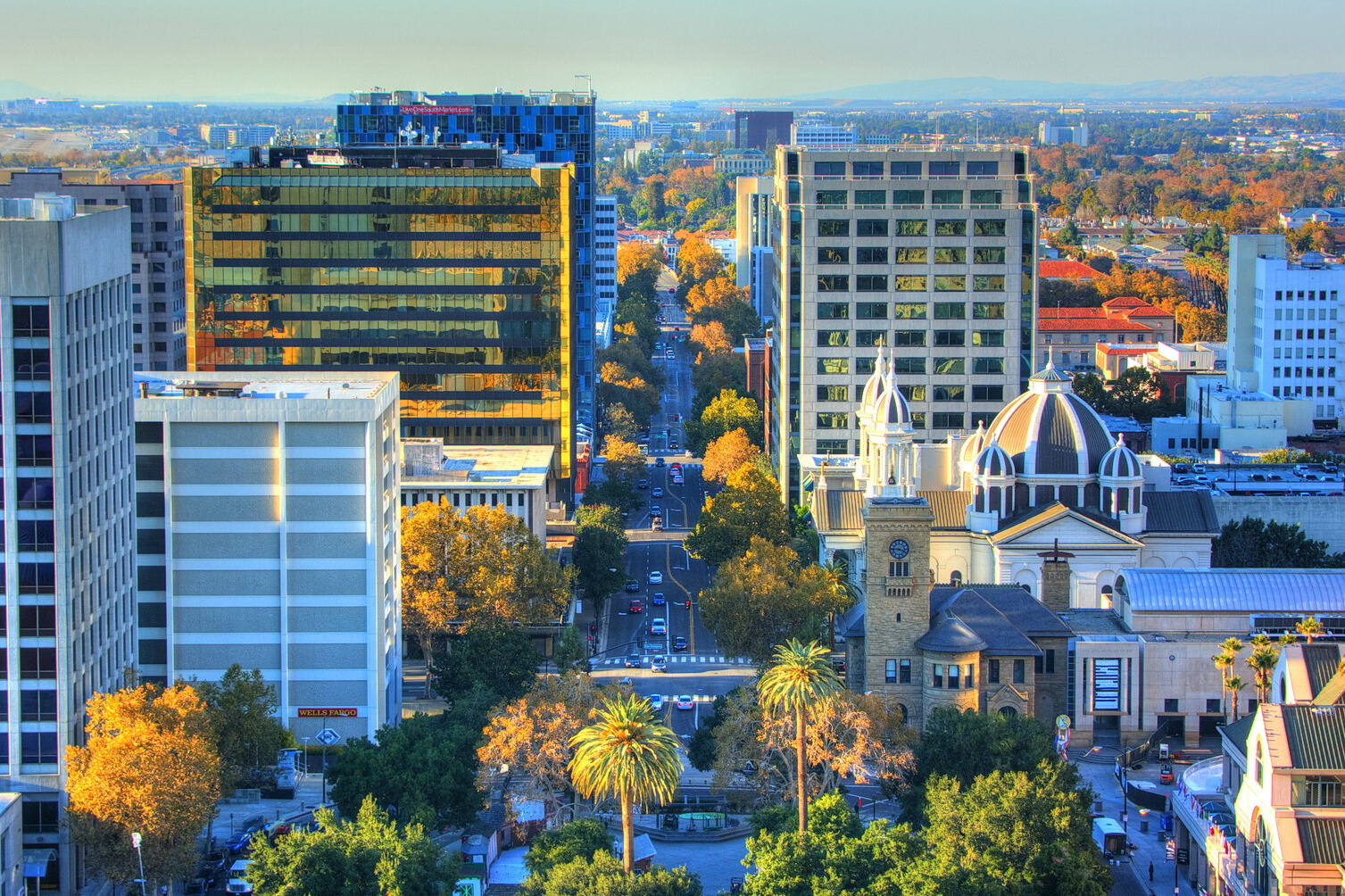
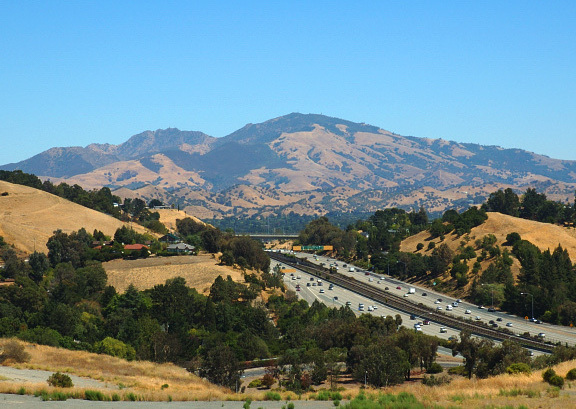
- Golden Gate Bridge Oakland Point Reyes Wine Country San Francisco San Jose Mount Diablo

- Location of the Bay Area within California; The nine-county Bay Area; Additional counties in the larger 13-county (Note: The Office of Management and Budget separated Sonoma County from the San Jose–San Francisco–Oakland combined statistical area in 2023.) combined statistical area (CSA)
- Country: United States
- State: California
- Subregions: East Bay; North Bay; Peninsula; San Francisco; South Bay
- Counties: List: Alameda; Contra Costa; Marin; Napa; San Mateo; Santa Clara; Solano; Sonoma; San Francisco
- Core cities: Oakland; San Francisco; San Jose
- Other municipalities: List: Antioch; Berkeley; Concord; Daly City; Fairfield; Fremont; Hayward; Richmond; San Mateo; Santa Clara; Santa Rosa; Sunnyvale; Vacaville; Vallejo

Area
  - Nine-county: 6,966 sq mi (18,040 km^{2})
  - CSA: 10,191 sq mi (26,390 km^{2})
- Highest elevation Copernicus Peak: 4,360 ft (1,330 m)
- Lowest elevation Alviso: −13 ft (−4.0 m)

Population (2020)
  - Nine-county: 7,765,149
  - Density: 1,100/sq mi (430/km^{2})
  - CSA: 9,220,000

GDP (2024)
  - Nine-county: $1.202 trillion
- Time zone: UTC−08:00 (Pacific)
  - Summer (DST): UTC−07:00 (PDT)
- Area codes: 408/669, 415/628, 510/341, 650, 707/369, 925
- Website: bayareametro.gov

The San Francisco Bay Area is the cultural and economic center of Northern California. The region surrounds San Francisco Bay, and is anchored by Oakland, San Francisco, and San Jose. It is commonly known as the Bay Area, or simply the Bay. With a population of over nine million people, the Bay Area is the second-largest combined statistical area in California and the fifth-largest in the United States. The Bay Area houses the global center of the technology industry, and is also a nexus for healthcare, education, finance, shipping, and tourism. The region is known for its natural beauty, cultural landmarks, diverse communities, and affluence.

The Association of Bay Area Governments defines the Bay Area as including the nine counties that border the estuaries of San Francisco Bay, San Pablo Bay, and Suisun Bay: Alameda, Contra Costa, Marin, Napa, San Mateo, Santa Clara, Solano, Sonoma, and San Francisco. The U.S. Census Bureau includes the Central Coast counties of Santa Cruz and San Benito, as well as the Central Valley counties of San Joaquin, Merced, and Stanislaus in its broader definition.

The earliest archaeological evidence of settlement in the Bay Area dates back to 8,000–10,000 BC. The oral tradition of the Ohlone and Miwok people suggests they have been living in the Bay Area for several hundreds if not thousands of years. The Spanish Empire claimed the area beginning in the early period of Spanish colonization of the Americas. The earliest Spanish exploration of the Bay Area took place in 1769. The Mexican government controlled the area from 1821 until the 1848 Treaty of Guadalupe Hidalgo. Also in 1848, James W. Marshall discovered gold in nearby mountains, resulting in explosive immigration to the area and the precipitous decline of the Native population. The California gold rush brought rapid growth to the region. California was admitted as the 31st state in 1850. A major earthquake and fire leveled much of San Francisco in 1906. During World War II, the Bay Area played a major role in America's war effort in the Asiatic-Pacific theater, with Fort Mason commanding a primary embarkation point for American forces. Since then, the Bay Area has developed unique local genres in art and music and established itself as a hotbed of progressive politics.

The postwar Bay Area saw large growth in the financial and technology industries, creating one of the most economically productive regions in the United States and the world, with a gross domestic product of over $1.3 trillion in 2024, higher than all but 17 countries. In 2018, it was home to the third-highest concentration of Fortune 500 companies in the United States. As of 2020, the Bay Area ranked second by GDP per capita ($131,082) across all metropolitan areas in OECD countries.

The Bay Area's population is ethnically diverse: roughly three-fifths of the region's residents are Hispanic/Latino, Asian, African/Black, or Pacific Islander, all of whom have a significant presence throughout the region. Most of the remaining two-fifths of the population is non-Hispanic White American.

San Francisco Bay is one of California's most ecologically sensitive habitats, providing important ecosystem services such as filtering the pollutants and sediments from rivers and supporting a number of endangered species. In addition, the Bay Area is known for its stands of coast redwoods, many of which are protected in state and county parks. The region is additionally known for the complexity of its landforms, the result of millions of years of tectonic plate movements. Because the Bay Area is crossed by six major faults, the region is particularly exposed to hazards presented by large earthquakes. The region's climate is temperate and conducive to outdoor recreational and athletic activities such as hiking, running, and cycling.

The Bay Area is host to teams in each of the five largest North American men's professional sports leagues and one of the most extensive public transportation systems in the United States. It is also home to numerous higher education institutions, including research universities such as the University of California, Berkeley, and Stanford University, the latter known for helping to create Silicon Valley.

== History ==
=== Pre-colonization ===
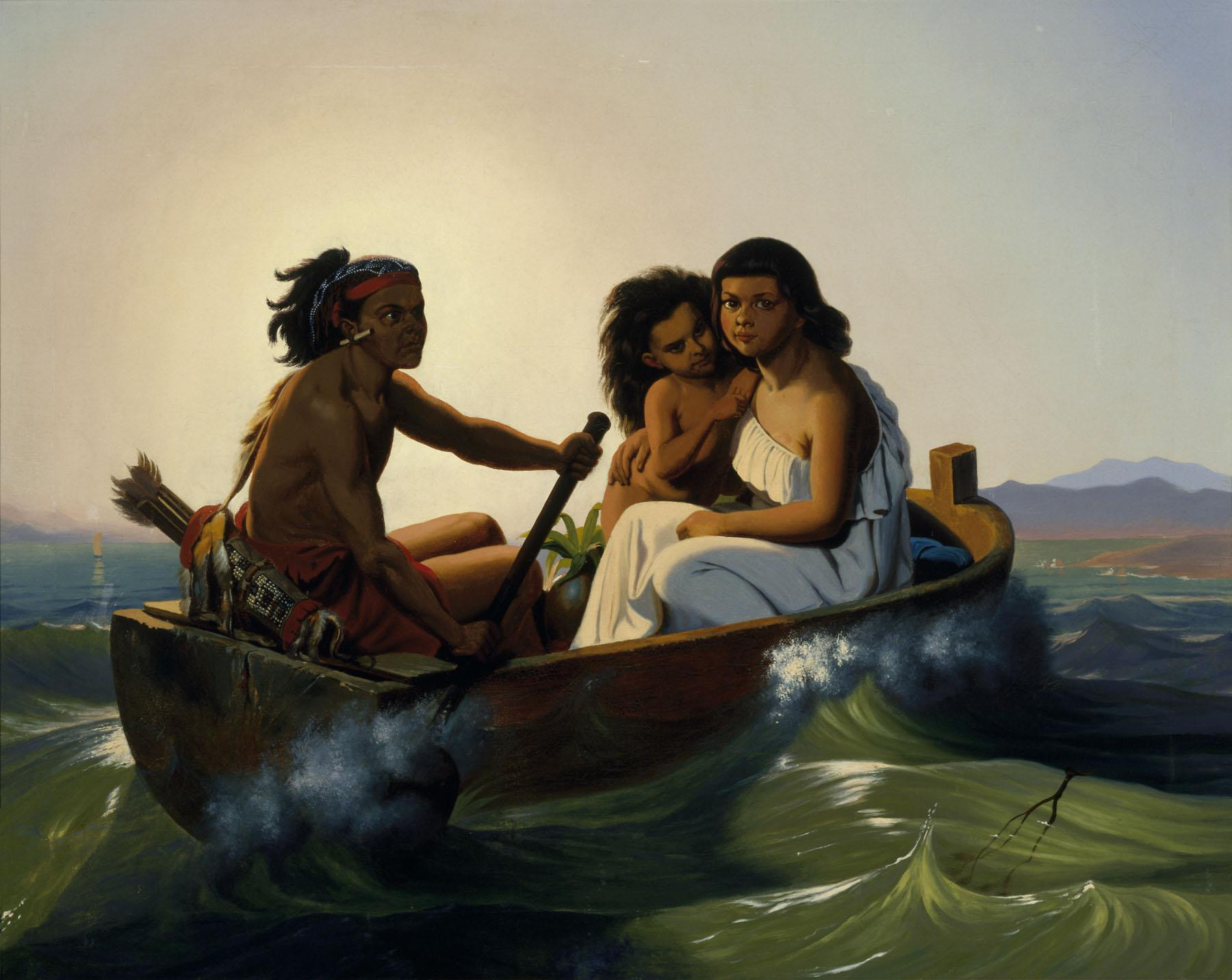
The Ohlone, an indigenous Californian people, have lived in the Bay Area for thousands of years.

The Coyote Hills Shell Mound, the earliest known archaeological evidence of human habitation of the Bay Area estuaries, dates to around 10,000 BCE, with evidence pointing to even earlier settlement in Point Reyes in Marin County. It has been conjectured that the people living in the Bay Area at the time of first European contact were descended from Siberian tribes who arrived at around 1,000 BCE by sailing over the Arctic Ocean and following the salmon migration. However the current academic consensus is compatible with the oral tradition of the Ohlone and Miwok peoples, which suggests they have been living in the Bay Area for several hundreds if not thousands of years.

At the time of colonization, the Ohlone peoples in the Bay Area primarily lived on the San Francisco Peninsula, in the South Bay and in the East Bay, and the Miwok primarily lived in the North Bay, northern East Bay, and Central Valley. Ohlone villages were spread across the Peninsula, East Bay, South Bay, as well as further south into the Monterey Bay area. There were eight major divisions of Ohlone people, four of which were based in the Bay Area: the Karkin of the Carquinez Strait, the Chochenyo of the East Bay, the Ramaytush of the San Francisco Peninsula, and the Tamien of the South Bay. The Miwok had two major groups in the Bay Area: the Bay Miwok of Contra Costa and the Coast Miwok of Marin and Sonoma.

=== Colonization ===
In 1542, Juan Rodríguez Cabrillo explored the Pacific coast near the Bay Area though the expedition did not see the Golden Gate or the estuaries, likely due to fog. Sir Francis Drake became the first European to land in the area and claim it in June 1579, when he landed at Drakes Bay near Point Reyes. Even though he claimed the region for Queen Elizabeth I as Nova Albion or New Albion, the English made no immediate follow up to the claim.

In 1595, Philip II of Spain tasked Sebastião Rodrigues Soromenho with mapping the west coast of the Americas. Soromenho set sail on Manila Galleon San Agustin on July 5, 1595 and in early November they reached land between Point St. George and Trinidad Head, north of the Bay Area, in the Lost Coast. The expedition followed the coast southward and on November 7 the San Agustin anchored in Drakes Bay, and claimed the region as Puerto y Bahía de San Francisco. In late November, a storm sank the San Agustin and killed between 7 and 12 people. On December 8, 80 remaining crew members set sail on the San Buenaventura, a launch which was partially constructed en route from the Philippines. Seeking the fastest route south, the expedition sailed past the Golden Gate, arriving at Puerto de Chacala, Mexico on January 17, 1596.

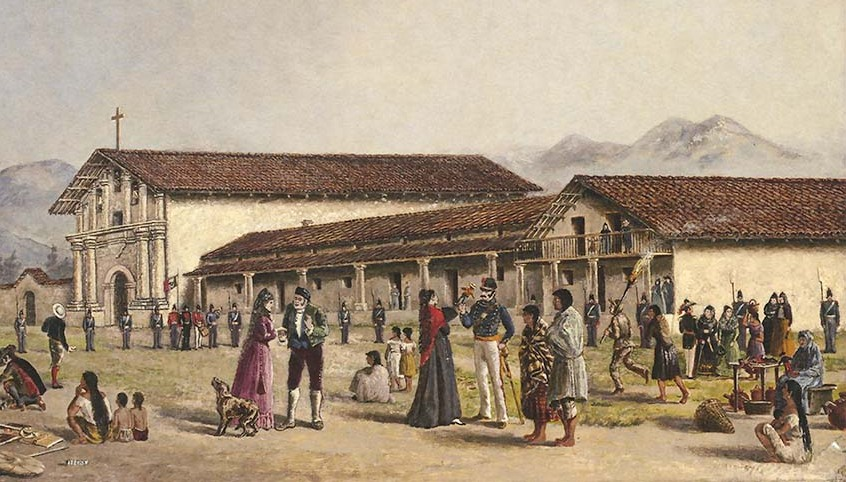
In 1776, Francisco Palóu founded Mission San Francisco de Asís, the first Spanish settlement in the Bay Area.

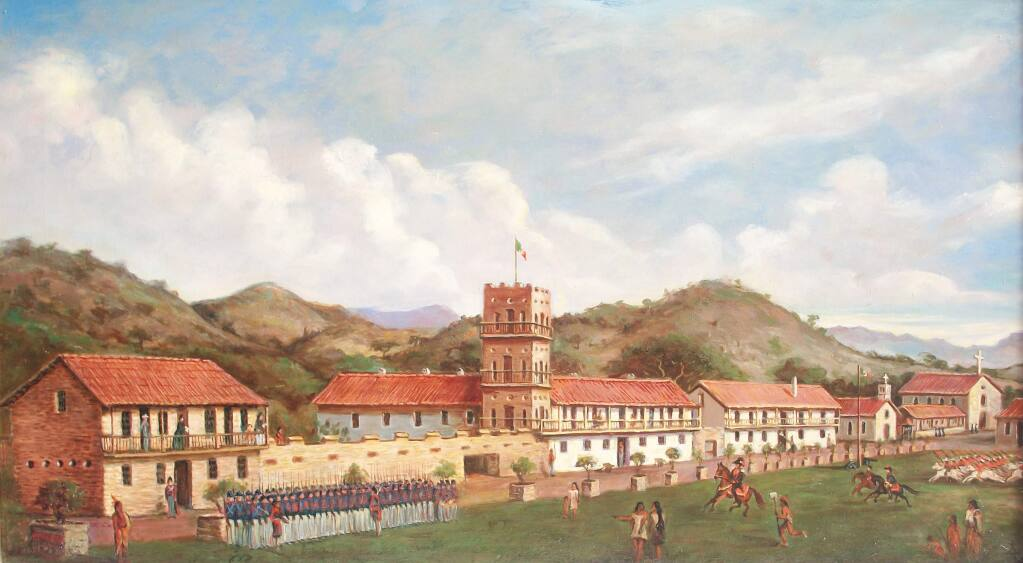
General Vallejo reviewing Californio troops in Sonoma, during the U.S. Conquest of California in 1846

The Bay Area estuaries remained unknown to Europeans until members of the Portolá expedition, while trekking along the California coast, encountered them in 1769 when the Golden Gate blocked their continued journey north. Several missions were founded in the Bay Area during this period. In 1806, a Spanish expedition led by Gabriel Moraga began at the Presidio, traveled south of the bay, and then east to explore the San Joaquin Valley.

In 1821, Mexico gained its independence from Spain and the Bay Area became part of the Mexican province of Alta California, a period characterized by ranch life and visiting American trappers. Mexico's control of the territory would be short-lived, however, and in 1846 a party of settlers occupied Sonoma Plaza and proclaimed the independence of the new Republic of California. That same year, the Mexican–American War began, and American captain John Berrien Montgomery sailed the USS Portsmouth into the bay and seized San Francisco, which was then known as Yerba Buena, and raised the American flag for the first time over Portsmouth Square.

=== Gold rush ===
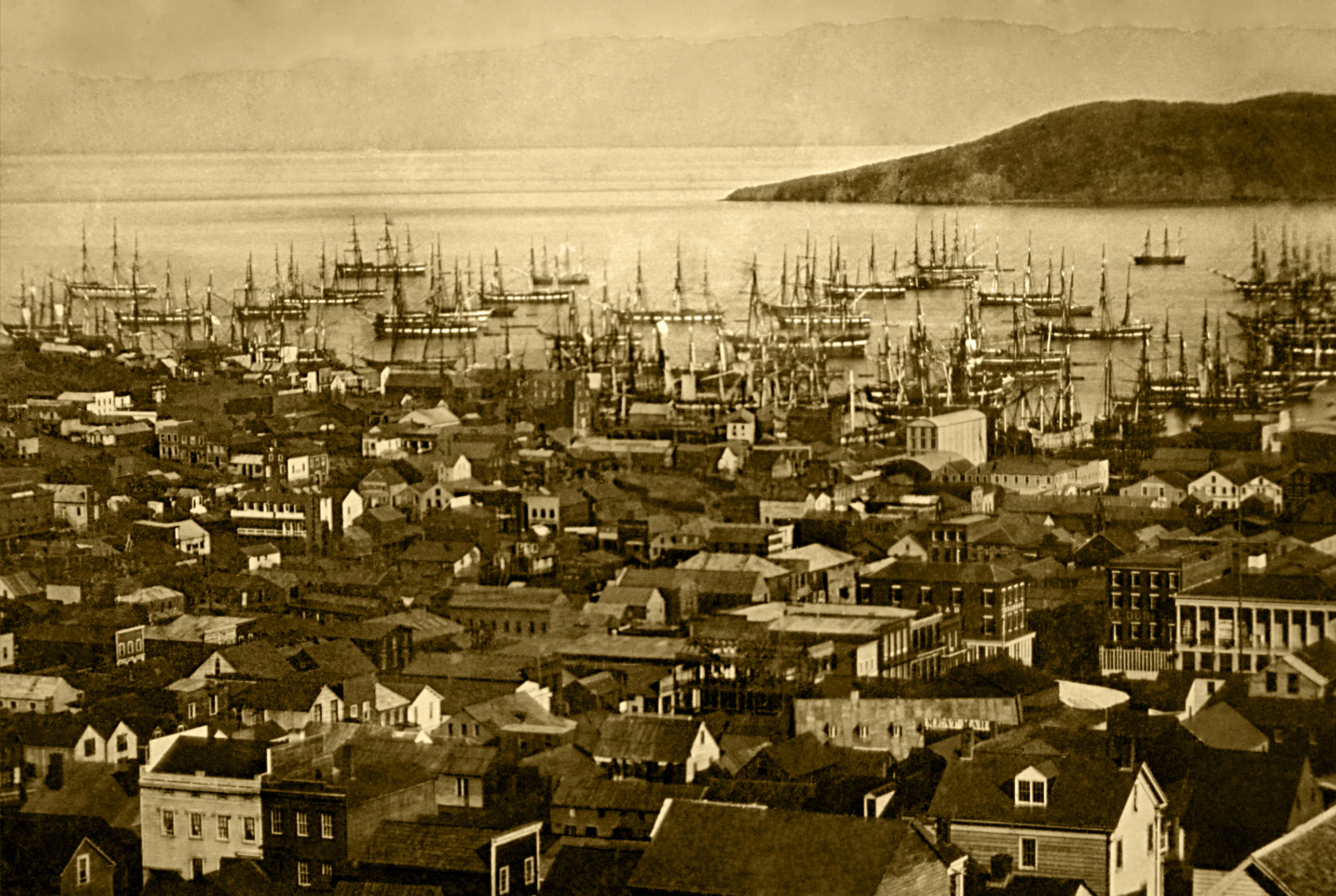
The Port of San Francisco during the California gold rush

In 1848, James W. Marshall's discovery of gold in the American River sparked the California gold rush, and within half a year 4,000 men were panning for gold along the river and finding $50,000 in gold per day. The promise of fabulous riches quickly led to a stampede of wealth-seekers descending on Sutter's Mill. The Bay Area's population quickly emptied out as laborers, clerks, waiters, and servants joined the rush to find gold, and California's first newspaper, The Californian, was forced to announce a temporary freeze in new issues due to labor shortages. By the end of 1849, news had spread across the world and newcomers flooded into the Bay Area at a rate of one thousand per week on their way to California's interior, including the first large influx of Chinese immigrants to the U.S. The rush was so great that vessels were abandoned by the hundreds in San Francisco's ports as crews rushed to the goldfields. The unprecedented influx of new arrivals spread the nascent government authorities thin, and the military was unable to prevent desertions. As a result, numerous vigilante groups formed to provide order, but many tasked themselves with forcibly moving or killing local Native Americans, and by the end of the gold rush, two thirds of the indigenous population had been killed.

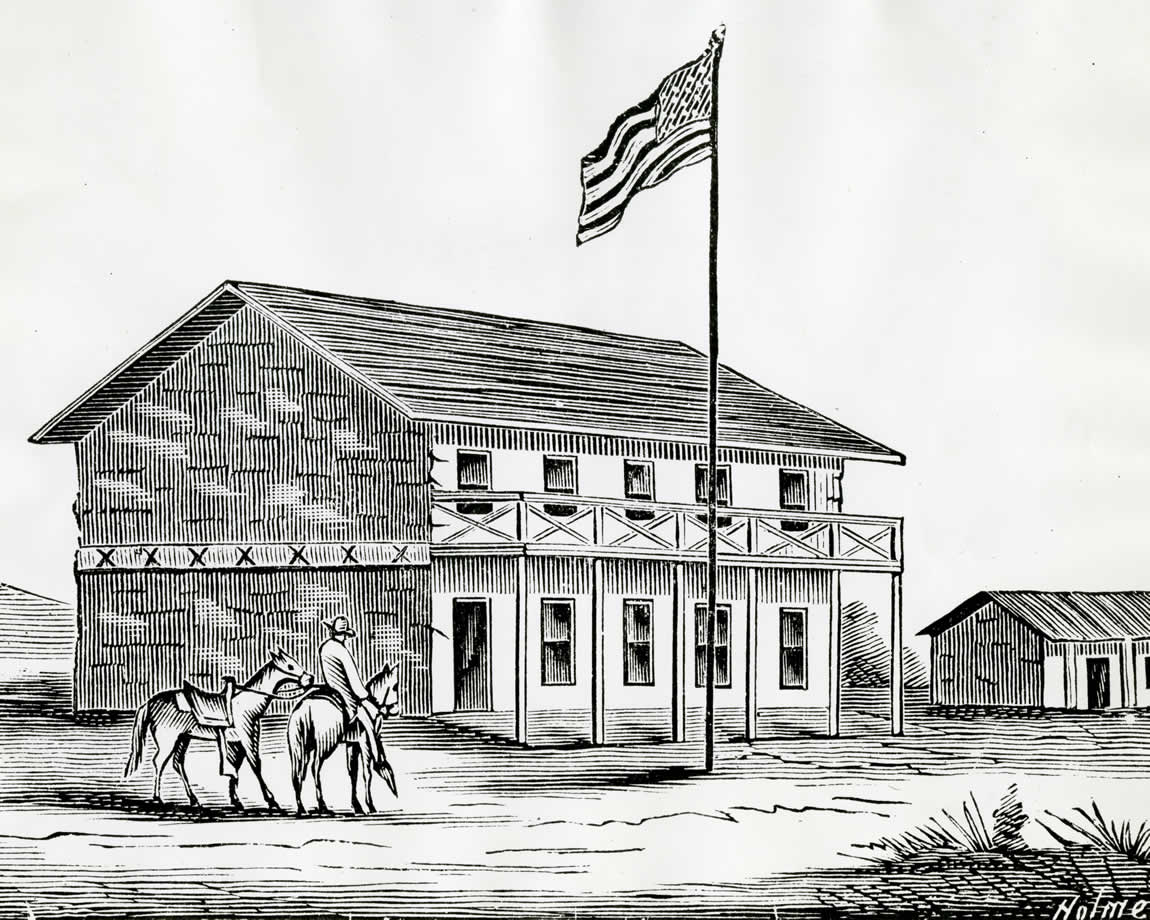
San Jose served as the first state capitol following the California's Admission to the Union in 1850.

During this same time, a constitutional convention was called to determine California's application for statehood into the United States. After statehood was granted, the capital city moved between three cities in the Bay Area: San Jose (1849–1851), Vallejo (1851–1852), and Benicia (1852–1853) before permanently settling in Sacramento in 1854. As the gold rush subsided, wealth generated from the endeavor led to the establishment of Wells Fargo Bank and the Bank of California, and immigrant laborers attracted by the promise of wealth transformed the demographic makeup of the region. Construction of the First transcontinental railroad from the Oakland Long Wharf attracted so many laborers from China that by 1870, eight percent of San Francisco's population was of Asian origin. The completion of the railroad connected the Bay Area with the rest of the United States, established a truly national marketplace for the trade of goods, and accelerated the urbanization of the region.

=== Earthquake, depression, and homefront ===
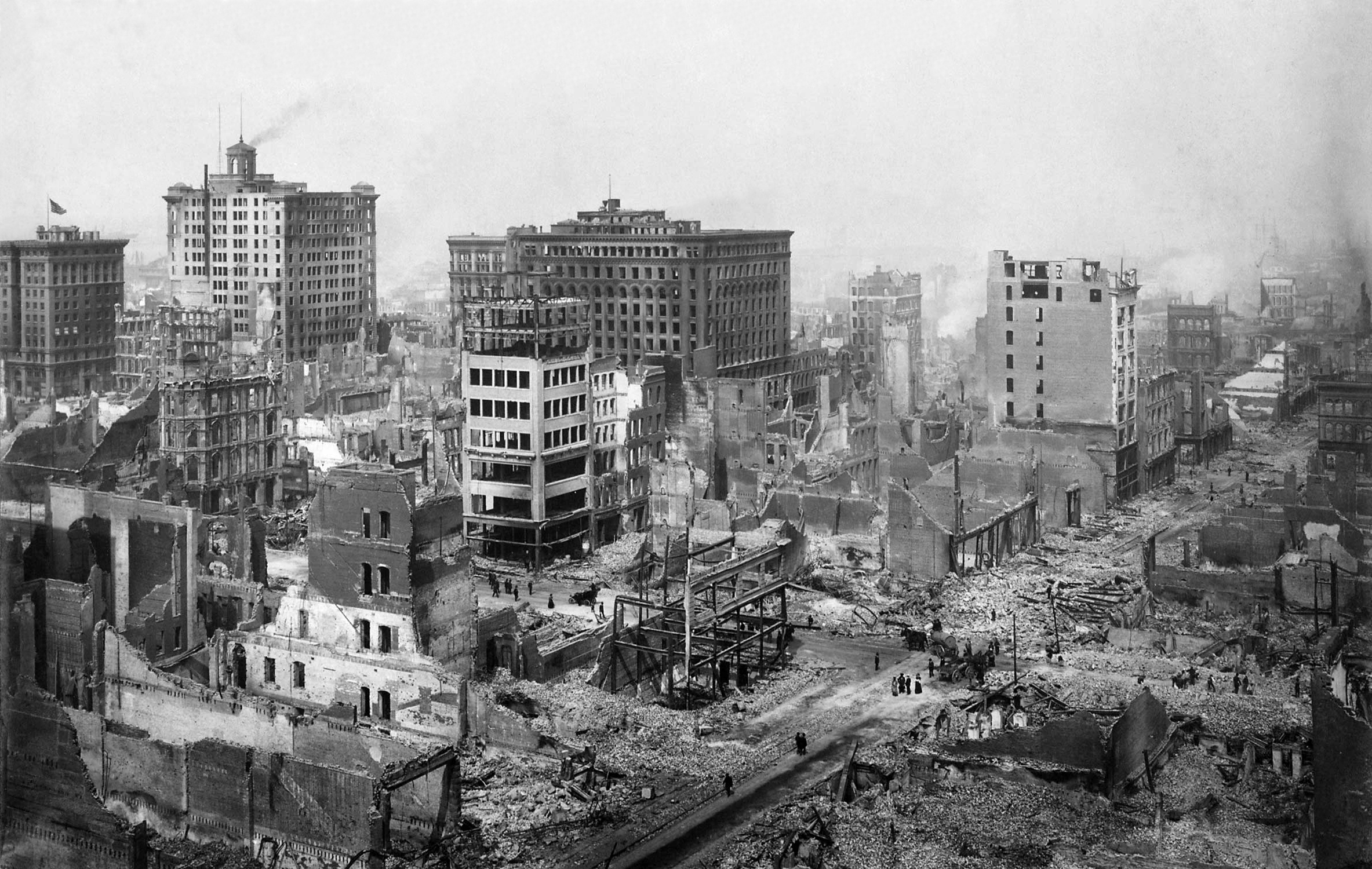
Damaged buildings in the aftermath of the 1906 San Francisco earthquake

In the early morning of April 18, 1906, a large earthquake with an epicenter near the city of San Francisco hit the region. Immediate casualty estimates by the U.S. Army's relief operations were 498 deaths in San Francisco, 64 deaths in Santa Rosa, and 102 in or near San Jose, for a total of about 700. More recent studies estimate the total death count to be over 3,000, with over 28,000 buildings destroyed. Rebuilding efforts began immediately. Amadeo Peter Giannini, owner of the Bank of Italy (now known as the Bank of America), had managed to retrieve the money from his bank's vaults before fires broke out through the city and was the only bank with liquid funds readily available and was instrumental in loaning out funds for rebuilding efforts. Congress immediately approved plans for a reservoir in Hetch Hetchy Valley in Yosemite National Park, a plan they had denied a few years earlier, which now provides drinking water for 2.4 million people in the Bay Area. By 1915, the city had been sufficiently rebuilt and advertised itself to the world during the Panama Pacific Exposition that year, although the effects of the quake hastened the loss of the region's dominant status in California to the Los Angeles metropolitan area.

The United Nations was created in San Francisco in 1945, when the United Nations Charter was signed at the San Francisco Conference.

During the 1929 stock market crash and subsequent economic depression, not a single San Francisco-based bank failed, while the region attempted to spur job growth by simultaneously undertaking two large infrastructure projects: construction of the Golden Gate Bridge, which would connect San Francisco with Marin County, and the Bay Bridge, which would connect San Francisco with Oakland and the East Bay. After the United States joined World War II in 1941, the Bay Area became a major domestic military and naval hub, with large shipyards constructed in Sausalito and across the East Bay to build ships for the war effort. The Army's San Francisco Port of Embarkation was the primary origin for Army forces shipping out to the Pacific Theater of Operations. That command consisted of fourteen installations including Fort Mason, the Oakland Army Base, Camp Stoneman and Fort McDowell in San Francisco Bay and the sub port of Los Angeles.

After World War II, the United Nations was chartered in San Francisco, and in September 1951, the Treaty of San Francisco to re-establish peaceful relations between Japan and the Allied Powers was signed in San Francisco, entering into force a year later. In the years immediately following the war, the Bay Area saw a huge wave of immigration as populations increased across the region. Between 1950 and 1960, San Francisco welcomed over 100,000 new residents, inland suburbs in the East Bay saw their populations double, Daly City's population quadrupled, and Santa Clara's population quintupled.

=== Counterculture and tech ===
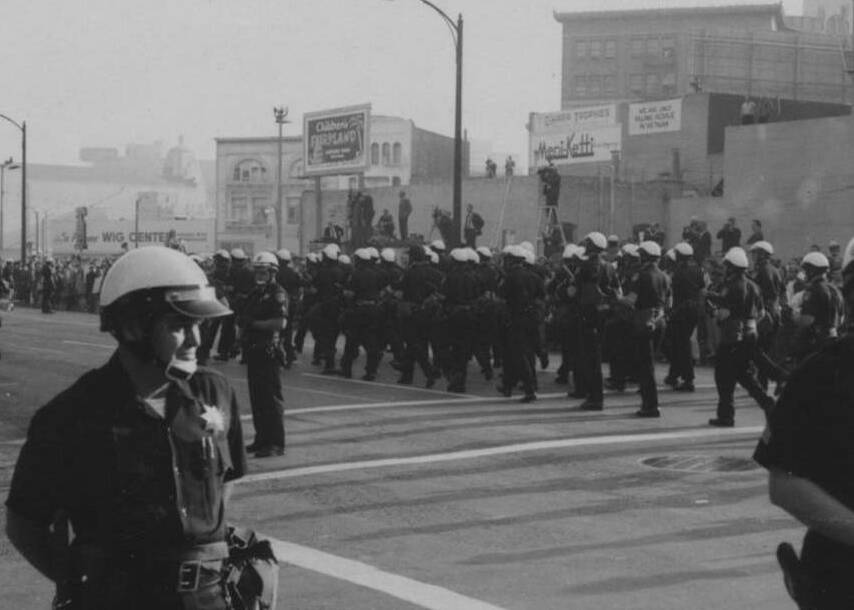
Vietnam War draft evasion march in Oakland, led by David Harris in 1967.

By the early 1960s, the Bay Area and the rest of Northern California became the center of the counterculture movement. Telegraph Avenue in Berkeley and the Haight-Ashbury neighborhood in San Francisco were seen as centers of activity, with the hit American pop song San Francisco (Be Sure to Wear Flowers in Your Hair) further enticing like-minded individuals to join the movement in the Bay Area and leading to the Summer of Love. In the proceeding decades, the Bay Area would cement itself as a hotbed of New Left activism, student activism, opposition to the Vietnam War and other anti-war movements, the black power movement, and the gay rights movement. At the same time, parts of San Mateo and Santa Clara counties began to rapidly develop from an agrarian economy into a hotbed of the high-tech industry. Fred Terman, the director of a top-secret research project at Harvard University during World War II, joined the faculty at Stanford University in order to reshape the university's engineering department. His students, including David Packard and William Hewlett, would later help usher in the region's high-tech revolution. In 1955, Shockley Semiconductor Laboratory opened for business in Mountain View near Stanford, and although the business venture was a financial failure, it was the first semiconductor company in the Bay Area, and the talent that it attracted to the region eventually led to a high-tech cluster of companies later known as Silicon Valley.

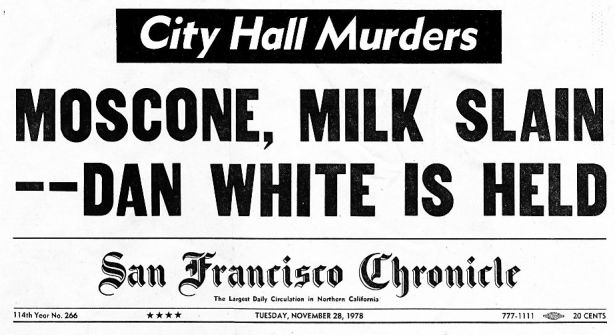
The assassinations of George Moscone and Harvey Milk in 1978 led to the White Night riots and the abolition of diminished responsibility as a criminal defense in California.

In 1989, in the middle of a World Series game between two Bay Area baseball teams, the Loma Prieta earthquake struck and caused widespread infrastructural damage, including the failure of the Bay Bridge, a major link between San Francisco and Oakland. Even so, the Bay Area's technology industry continued to expand and growth in Silicon Valley accelerated: the United States census confirmed that year that San Jose had overtaken San Francisco in terms of population. The commercialization of the Internet in the middle of the decade rapidly created a speculative bubble in the high-tech economy known as the dot-com bubble. This bubble began collapsing in the early 2000s and the industry continued contracting for the next few years, nearly wiping out the market. Companies like Amazon.com and Google managed to weather the crash however, and following the industry's return to normalcy, their market value increased significantly.

Even as the growth of the technology sector transformed the region's economy, progressive politics continued to guide the region's political environment. By the turn of the millennium, non-Hispanic whites, the largest ethnic group in the United States, were only half of the population in the Bay Area as immigration among minority groups accelerated. During this time, the Bay Area was the center of the LGBT rights movement: in 2004, San Francisco began issuing marriage licenses to same-sex couples, a first in the United States, and four years later a majority of voters in the Bay Area rejected California Proposition 8, which sought to constitutionally restrict marriage to opposite-sex couples but ultimately passed statewide.

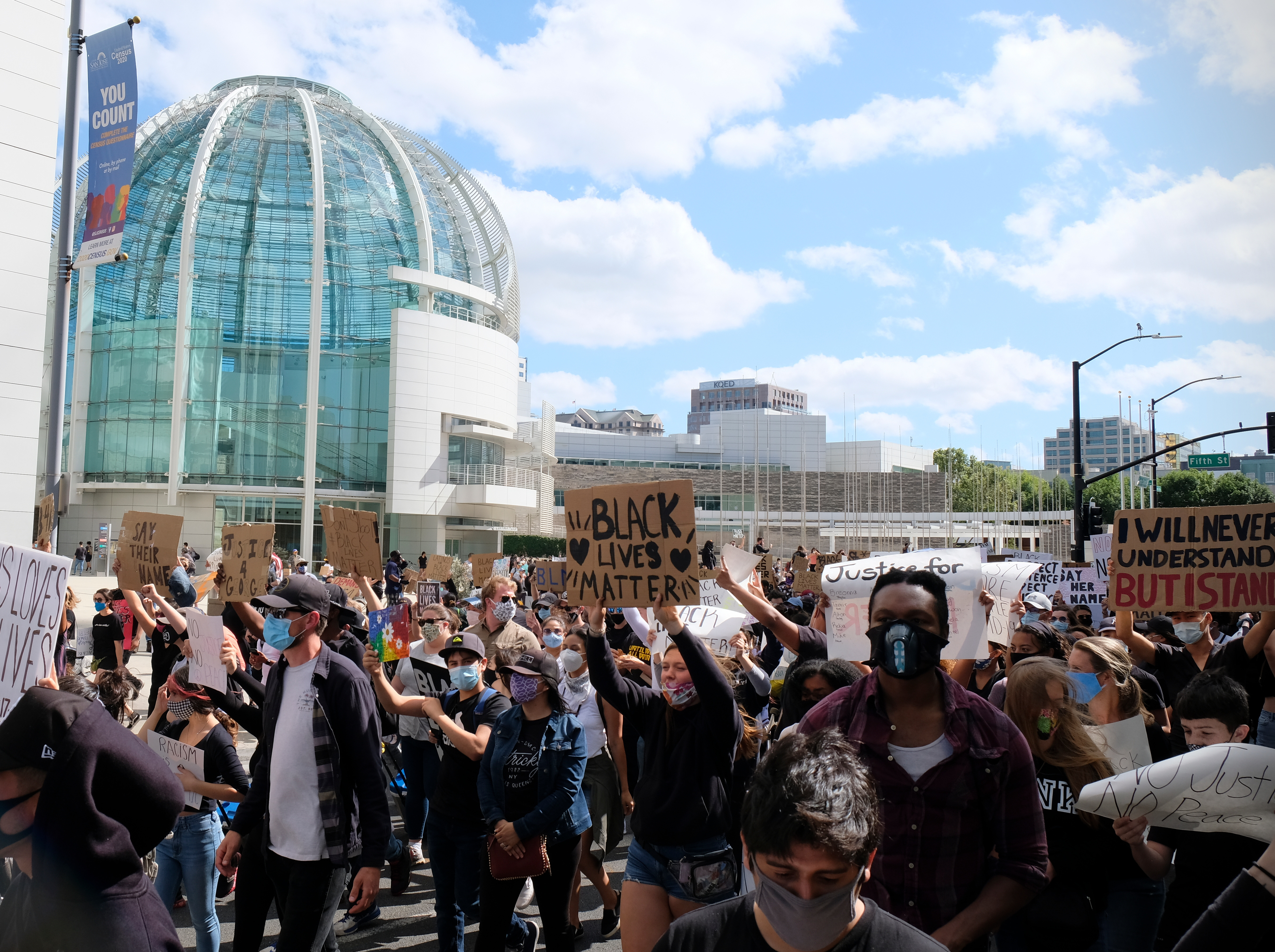
Black Lives Matter/George Floyd protests in San Jose in 2020

The Bay Area was also the center of contentious protests concerning racial and economic inequality. In 2009, an African-American man named Oscar Grant was fatally shot by Bay Area Rapid Transit police officers, precipitating widespread protests across the region and even riots in Oakland. His name was symbolically tied to the Occupy Oakland protests two years later that sought to fight against social and economic inequality.

== Geography ==
The borders of the San Francisco Bay Area are not officially delineated, and the unique development patterns influenced by the region's topography, as well as unusual commute patterns caused by the presence of three central cities and employment centers located in various suburban locales, has led to considerable disagreement between local and federal definitions of the area. Because of this, professor of geography at the University of California, Berkeley Richard Walker claimed that "no other U.S. city-region is as definitionally challenged [as the Bay Area]."

=== Local boundaries ===
A map of the Bay Area and its subregions, divided by counties: East Bay North Bay Peninsula San Francisco South Bay

When the region began to rapidly develop during and immediately after World War II, local planners settled on a nine-county definition for the Bay Area, consisting of the counties that directly border the San Francisco, San Pablo, and Suisun estuaries: Alameda, Contra Costa, Marin, Napa, San Francisco, San Mateo, Santa Clara, Solano, and Sonoma counties. Today, this definition is accepted by most local governmental agencies including San Francisco Regional Water Quality Control Board, Bay Area Air Quality Management District, the San Francisco Bay Restoration Authority, the Metropolitan Transportation Commission, and the Association of Bay Area Governments, the latter two of which partner to deliver a Bay Area Census using the nine-county definition.

The Association of Bay Area Health Officers (ABAHO), an organization that has fought local outbreaks of HIV/AIDS in 1980s and with COVID-19 pandemic and Deltacron hybrid variant (2020–22), consists of the public health officers of nine Bay Area counties, in addition to the Central Coast counties of Santa Cruz, San Benito, and Monterey and the city of Berkeley.

==== Subregions ====
The nine-county Bay Area is divided into five sub-regions: the East Bay, North Bay, Peninsula, city of San Francisco, and South Bay.

The East Bay is the densest region of the Bay Area outside of San Francisco and includes cities and towns in Alameda and Contra Costa counties centered around Oakland. As one of the larger subregions, the East Bay includes a variety of enclaves, including the suburban Tri-Valley area and the highly urban western part of the subregion that runs alongside the bay, including Oakland.

The North Bay includes Marin, Sonoma, Napa, and Solano counties, and is the geographically largest and least populated subregion. The western counties of Marin and Sonoma are encased by the Pacific Ocean on the west and the bay on the east and are characterized by their mountainous and woody terrain. Sonoma and Napa counties are known internationally for their grape vineyards and wineries, and Solano County to the east, centered around Vallejo, is the fastest growing region in the Bay Area.

Regions of the Bay Area

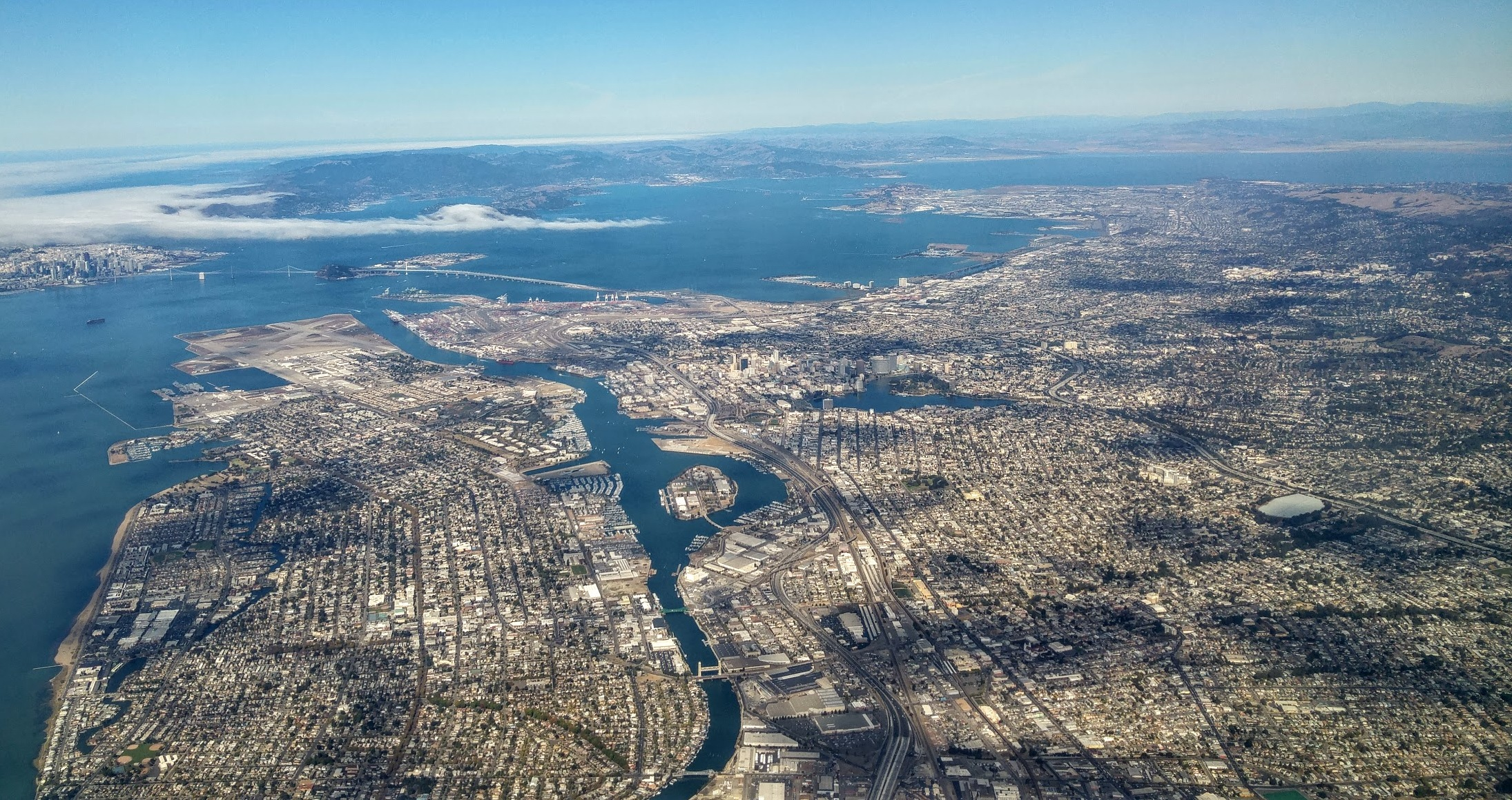
East Bay

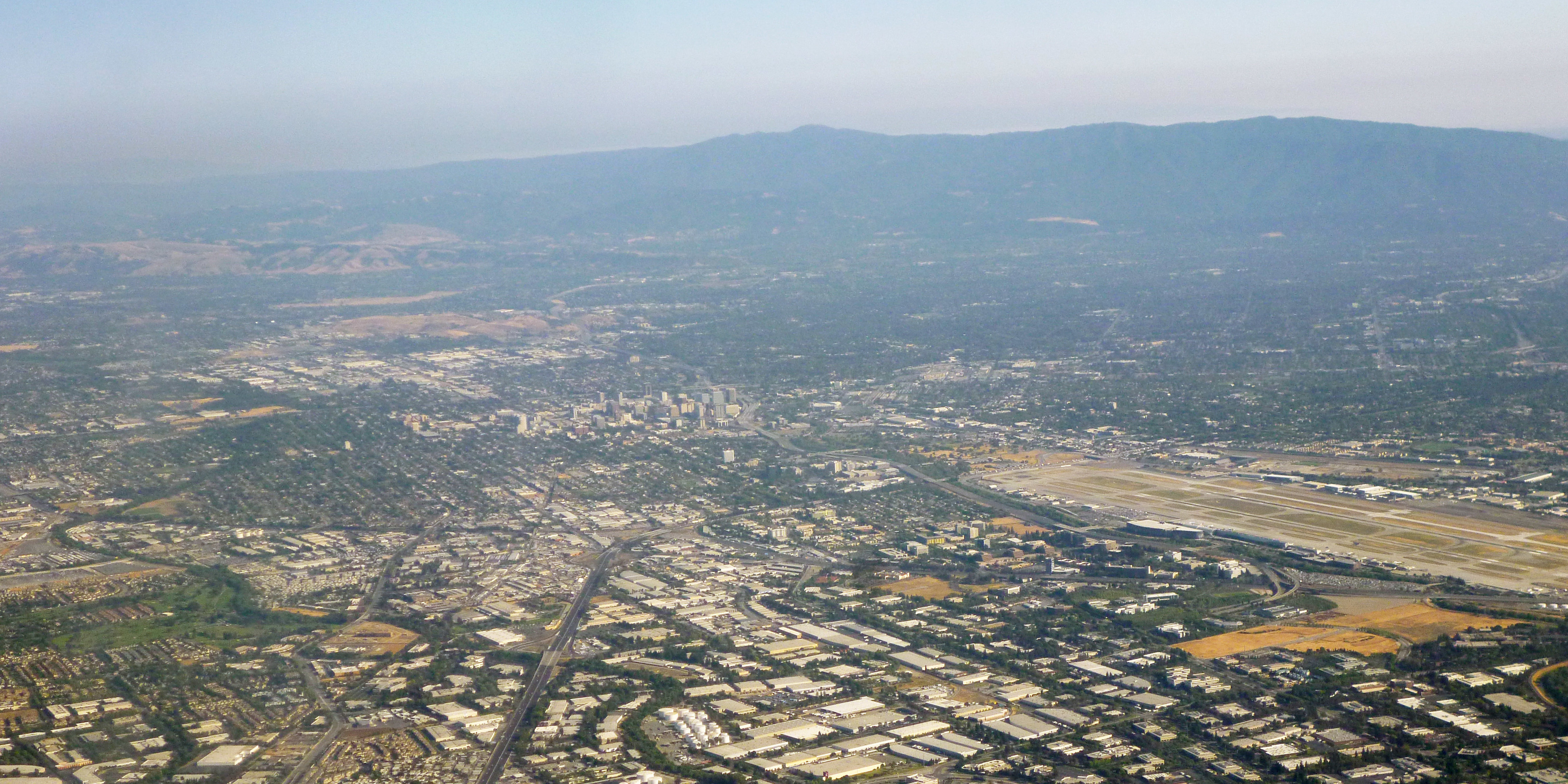
South Bay

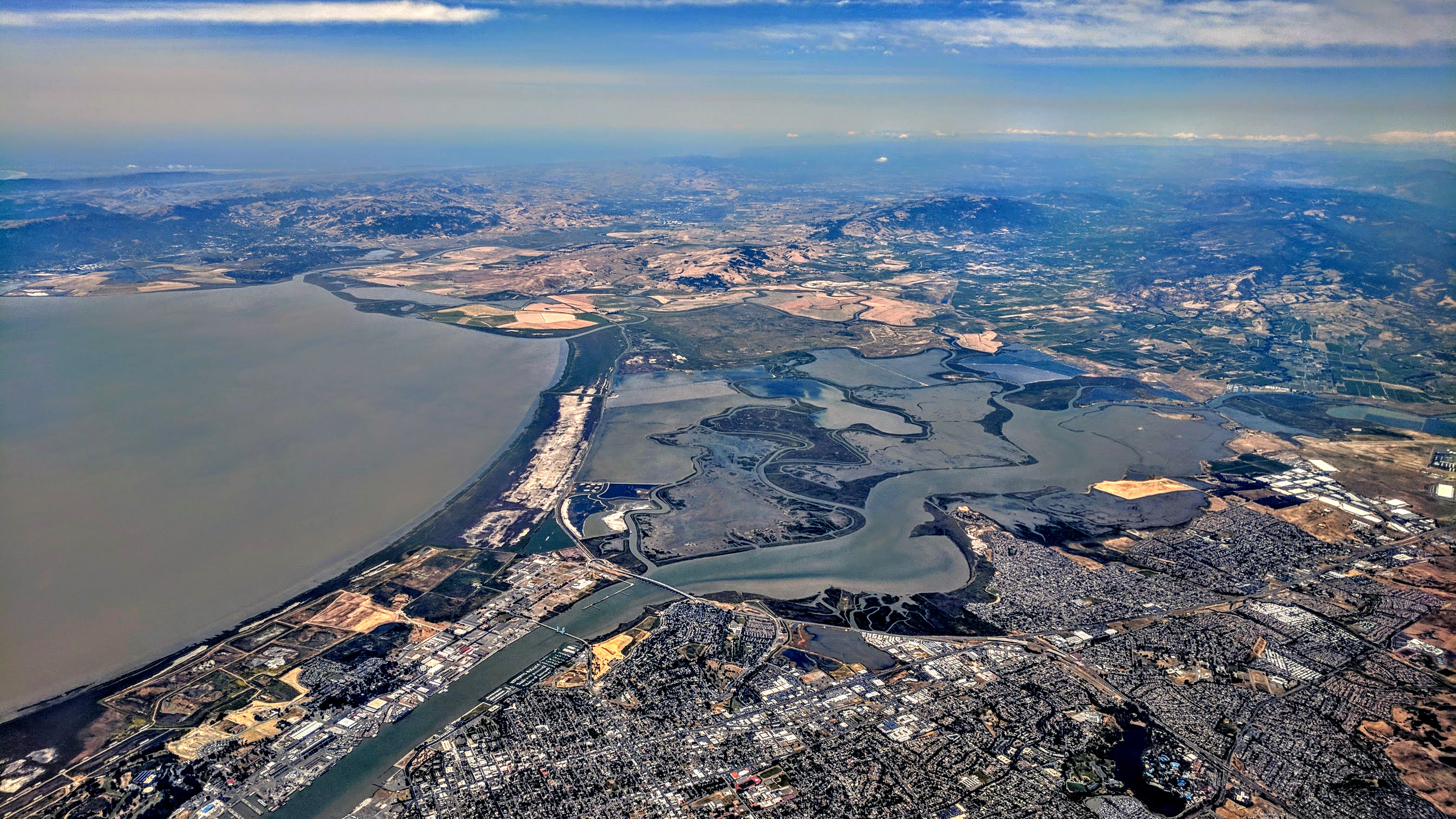
North Bay

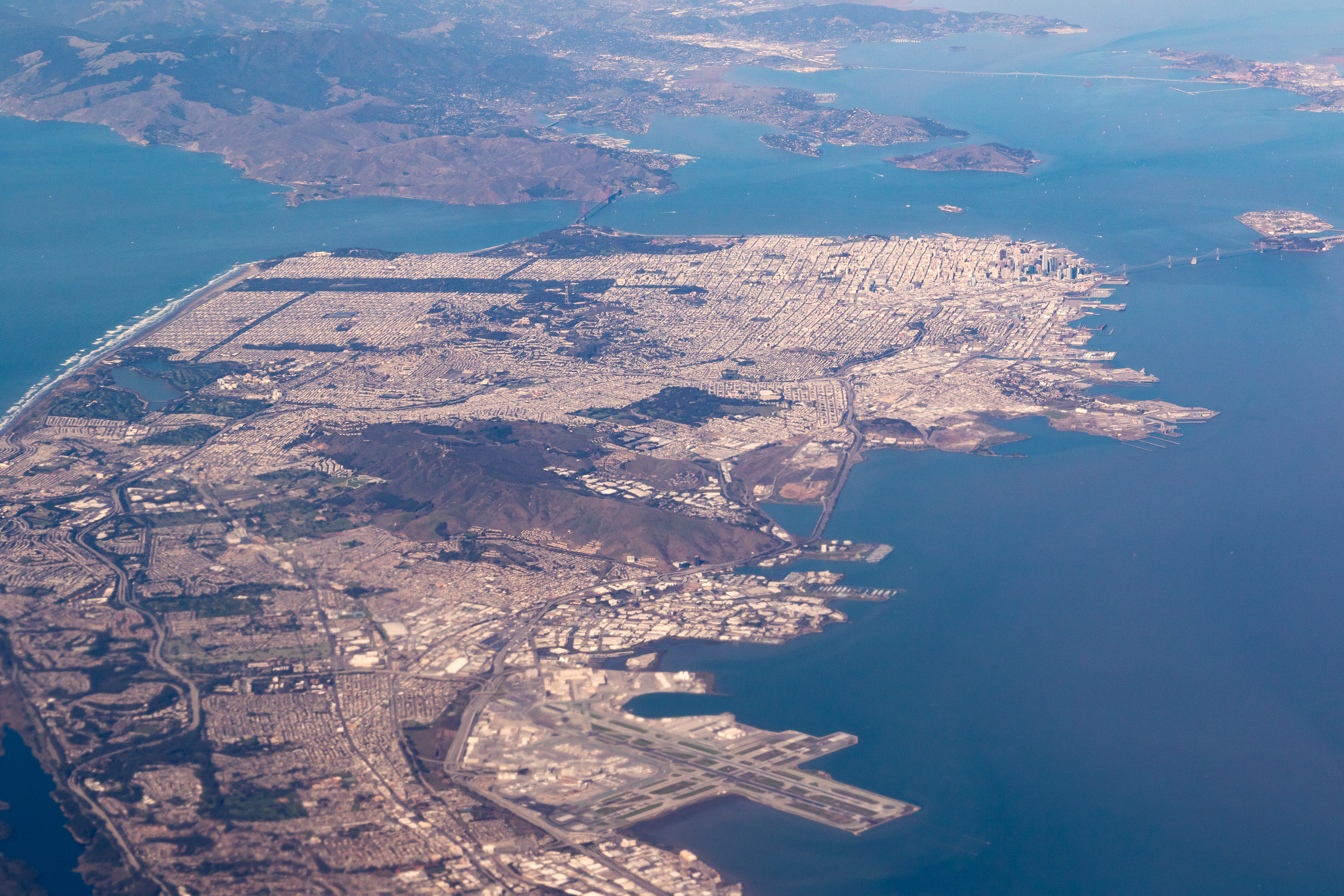
San Francisco and the Peninsula

The Peninsula subregion includes the cities and towns on the San Francisco Peninsula, excluding the titular city of San Francisco. Its eastern half, which runs alongside the Bay, is highly populated, while its less populated western coast traces the coastline of the Pacific Ocean and is known for its open space and hiking trails. Roughly coinciding with the borders of San Mateo County, it can also include the northwestern Santa Clara County cities of Palo Alto, Mountain View, and Los Altos.

Although geographically located on the tip of the San Francisco Peninsula, the city of San Francisco is not considered part of the "Peninsula" subregion, but as a separate entity.

The South Bay commonly refers to Santa Clara County, which is centered around San Jose and includes smaller cities such as Sunnyvale, Santa Clara, and Morgan Hill. This subregion's urban core stretches from the southern edge of San Francisco Bay to the northern border of San Benito County in Gilroy; occupying most of the southern portion of Santa Clara Valley between the Santa Cruz Mountains and the Diablo Range. Historically, the term has had slightly different meanings: the Army Corps of Engineers and the United States Department of Commerce in 1959 defined the South Bay as comprising five counties, corresponding to their two-way division of the Bay into north and south regions. In 1989, the federal Environmental Protection Agency defined the South Bay as the northern part of Santa Clara County and the southeastern part of San Mateo County.

=== Federal boundaries ===
The San Jose–San Francisco–Oakland combined statistical area and its constituent metropolitan statistical areas

Federal government agencies use definitions that differ from their local counterparts' nine-county definition. The United States Census Bureau and Office of Management and Budget group 13 counties within the San Jose–San Francisco–Oakland combined statistical area.

This CSA's primary metropolitan statistical areas include:

- San Francisco–Oakland–Fremont, which comprises Alameda, Contra Costa, Marin, San Francisco, and San Mateo counties
- San Jose–Sunnyvale–Santa Clara, which comprises Santa Clara and San Benito counties

Smaller MSAs within the region include:

- Napa, which comprises Napa County
- Vallejo, which comprises Solano County
- Merced, which comprises Merced County
- Modesto, which comprises Stanislaus County
- Santa Cruz–Watsonville, which comprises Santa Cruz County
- Stockton–Lodi, which comprises San Joaquin County

The Santa Rosa–Petaluma MSA, which comprises Sonoma County and is included in the traditional nine-county definition of the Bay Area, was dropped from the federal CSA in 2023.

Counties in the San Jose–San Francisco–Oakland Combined Statistical Area
County	2022 estimate	2020–22 change	2020 Population	2010 Population	2010–20 change	2020 Density (per sq mi)	MSA
Alameda	1,628,997	-3.2%	1,682,353	1,510,271	+11.4%	2,281.3	San Francisco–Oakland–Fremont
Contra Costa	1,156,966	-0.8%	1,165,927	1,049,025	+11.1%	1,626.3	San Francisco–Oakland–Fremont
Marin	256,018	-2.4%	262,321	252,409	+3.9%	504.1	San Francisco–Oakland–Fremont
San Francisco	808,437	-7.5%	873,965	805,235	+8.5%	18,629.1	San Francisco–Oakland–Fremont
San Mateo	729,181	-4.6%	764,442	718,451	+6.4%	1,704.0	San Francisco–Oakland–Fremont
San Benito	67,579	+5.3%	64,209	55,269	+16.2%	46.2	San Jose–Sunnyvale–Santa Clara
Santa Clara	1,870,945	-3.4%	1,936,259	1,781,642	+8.7%	1,499.7	San Jose–Sunnyvale–Santa Clara
Napa	134,300	-2.7%	138,019	136,484	+1.1%	184.4	Napa
Solano	448,747	-1.0%	453,491	413,344	+9.7%	551.8	Vallejo
Sonoma†	482,650	-1.3%	488,863	483,878	+1.0%	310.3	Santa Rosa–Petaluma
Merced	290,014	+3.1%	281,202	255,793	+9.9%	145.1	Merced
Santa Cruz	264,370	-2.4%	270,861	262,382	+3.2%	608.5	Santa Cruz–Watsonville
San Joaquin	793,229	+1.3%	779,233	685,306	+13.7%	559.6	Stockton–Lodi
Stanislaus	551,275	-0.3%	552,878	514,453	+7.5%	369.6	Modesto
Traditional ABAG-member Bay Area counties are colored in red. †Sonoma County was separated from the federal CSA in 2023.

Additionally, the Federal Communications Commission (FCC) which regulates broadcast, cable, and satellite transmissions, includes nearby Colusa, Lake and Mendocino counties in their "San Francisco-Oakland-San Jose" media market, but excludes eastern Solano County.

=== Climate ===
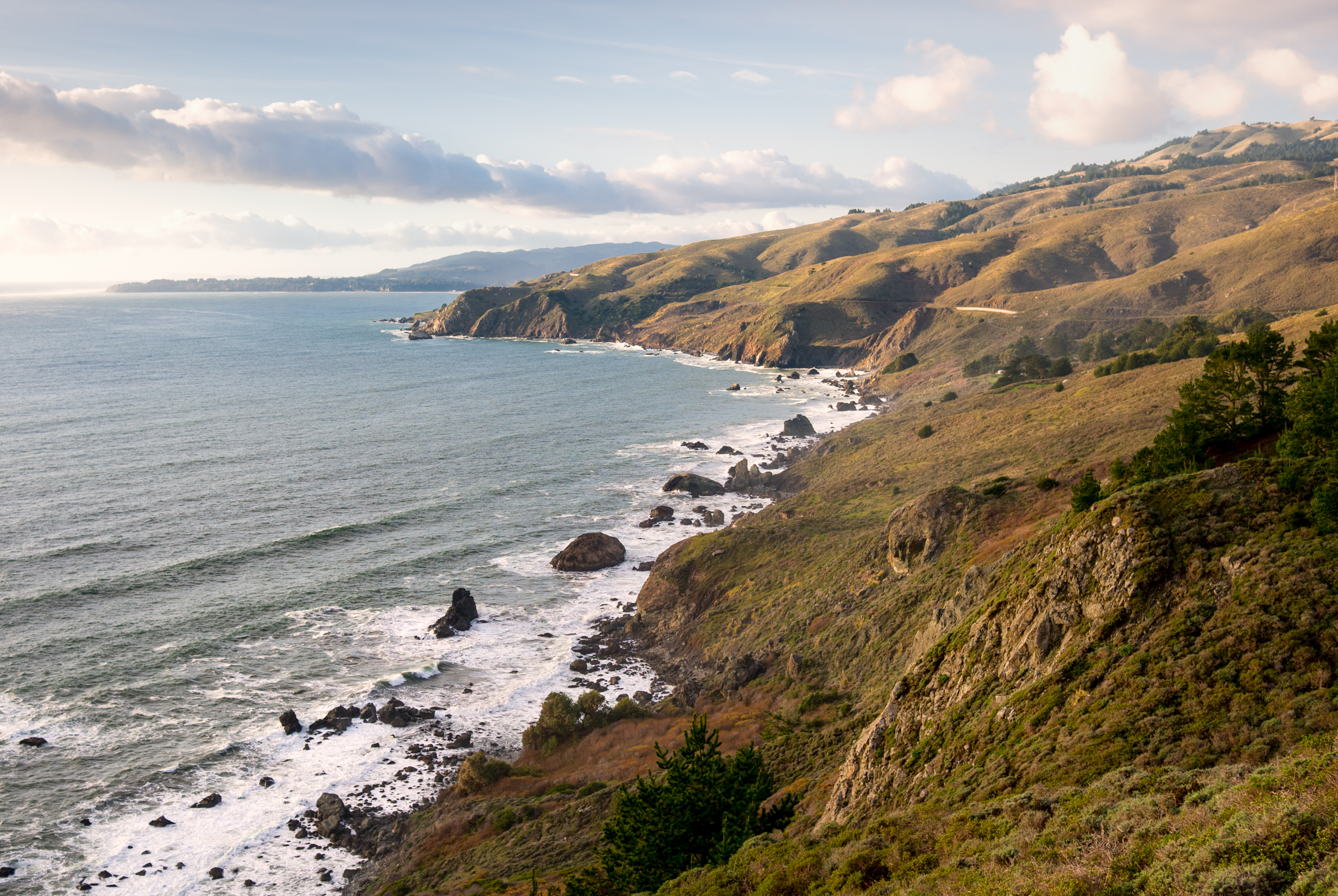
The North Coast near Muir Beach

The Bay Area is located in the warm-summer Mediterranean climate zone (Köppen Csb) that is a characteristic of California's coast, featuring mild to cool winters with occasional rainfall, and warm to hot, dry summers. It is largely influenced by the cold California Current, which penetrates the natural mountainous barrier along the coast by traveling through various gaps. In terms of precipitation, this means that the Bay Area has pronounced seasons. The winter season, which roughly runs between November and March, is the source of about 82% of annual precipitation in the area. In the South Bay and further inland, while the winter season is cool and mild, the summer season is characterized by warm sunny days, while in San Francisco and areas closer to the Golden Gate strait, the summer season is periodically affected by fog.

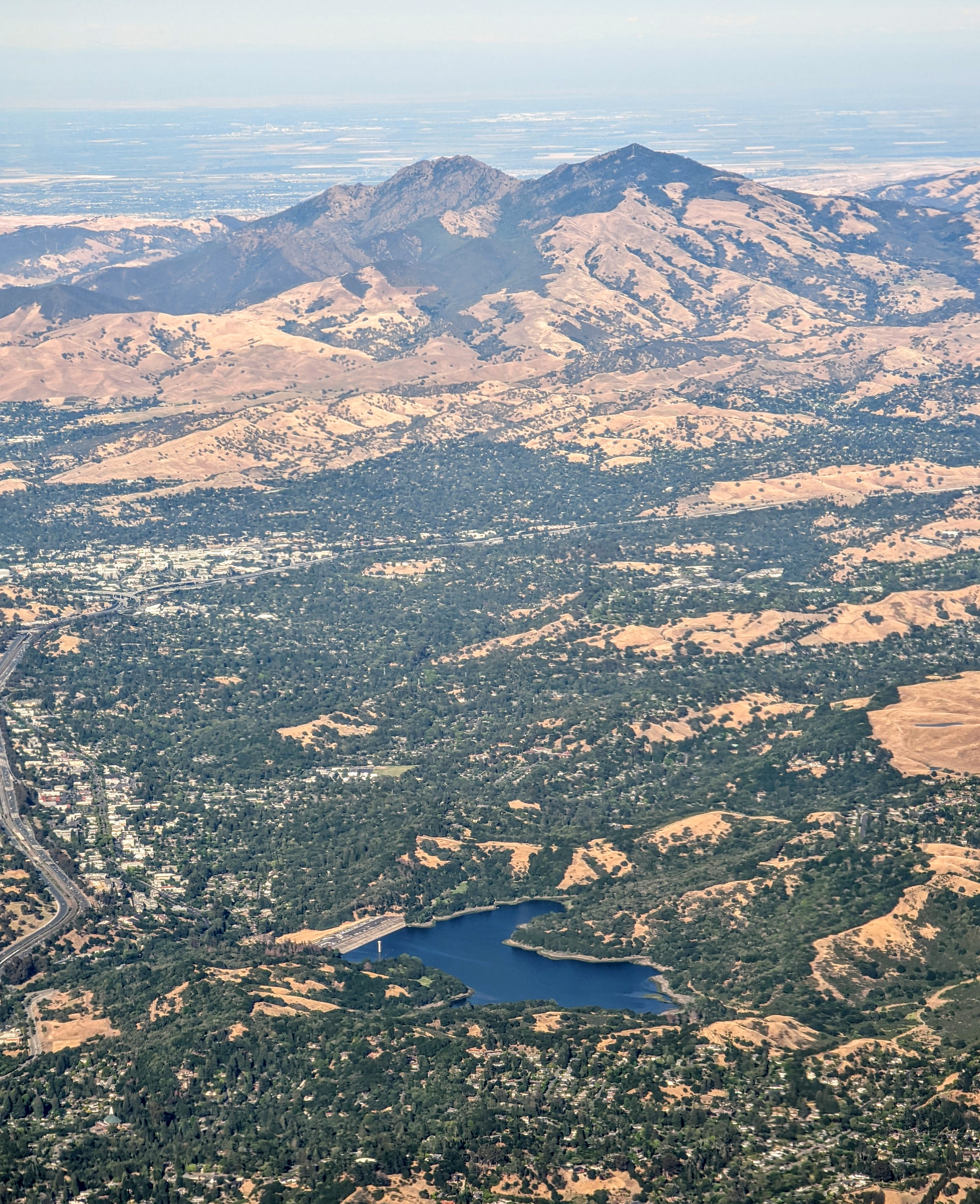
View of Mount Diablo beyond Lafayette Reservoir

Due to the Bay Area's diverse topographic relief (itself the result of the clashing tectonic plates), the region is home to numerous microclimates that lead to pronounced differences in climate and temperature over short distances. Within the city of San Francisco, natural and artificial topographical features direct the movement of wind and fog, resulting in startlingly varied climates between city blocks. Along the Golden Gate Strait, oceanic wind and fog from the Pacific Ocean are able to penetrate the mountain barriers inland into the Bay Area.

During the summer, rising hot air in California's interior valleys creates a low pressure area that draws winds from the North Pacific High through the Golden Gate, which creates the city's characteristic cool winds and fog. The microclimate phenomenon is most pronounced during this time, when fog penetration is at its maximum in areas near the Golden Gate strait, while the South Bay and areas further inland are sunny and dry.

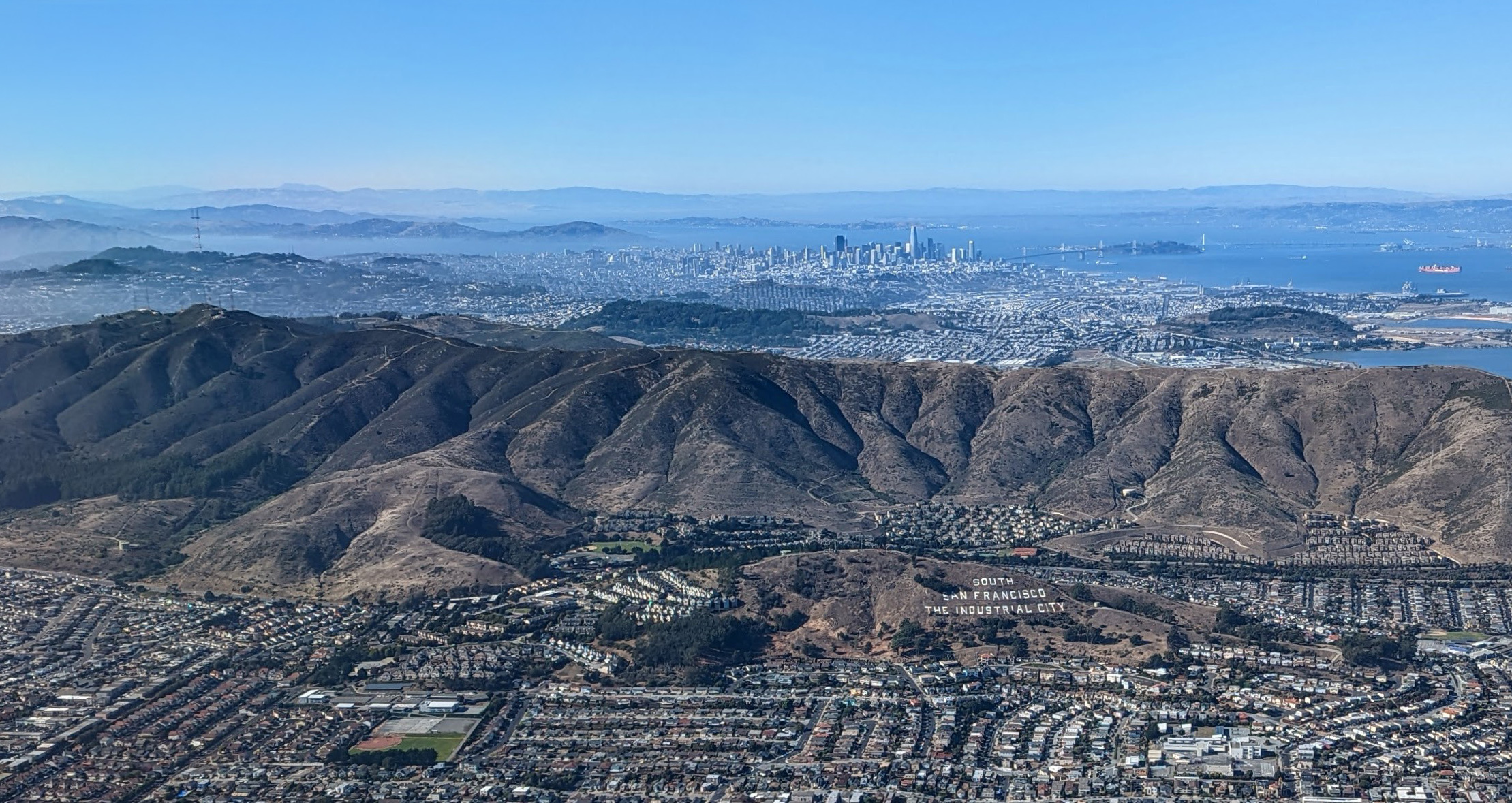
San Bruno Mountain divides San Francisco from San Mateo County.

Along the San Francisco peninsula, gaps in the Santa Cruz Mountains, one south of San Bruno Mountain and another in Crystal Springs, allow oceanic weather into the interior, causing a cooling effect for cities along the Peninsula and even as far south as San Jose. This weather pattern is also the source for delays at San Francisco International Airport. In Marin county north of the Golden Gate strait, two gaps north of Muir Woods bring cold air across the Marin Headlands, with the cooling effect reaching as far north as Santa Rosa. Further inland, the East Bay receives oceanic weather that travels through the Golden Gate strait, and further diffuses that air through the Berkeley Hills, Niles Canyon and the Hayward Pass into the Livermore Valley and Altamont Pass. Here, the resulting breeze is so strong that it is home to one of the world's largest array of wind turbines. Further north, the Carquinez Strait funnels the ocean weather into the San Joaquin River Delta, causing a cooling effect in Stockton and Sacramento, so that these cities are also cooler than their Central Valley counterparts in the south.

Average daily high and low temperatures in °F (°C) for selected locations in the Bay Area, colored and sortable by average monthly temperature
City	Jan	Feb	Mar	Apr	May	Jun	Jul	Aug	Sep	Oct	Nov	Dec
Fairfield	55 / 39 (13 / 4)	61 / 42 (16 / 6)	66 / 45 (19 / 7)	71 / 47 (22 / 8)	78 / 52 (26 / 11)	85 / 56 (29 / 13)	90 / 58 (32 / 14)	89 / 57 (32 / 14)	86 / 56 (30 / 13)	78 / 51 (26 / 11)	65 / 44 (18 / 7)	55 / 39 (13 / 4)
Oakland	58 / 44 (14 / 7)	67 / 47 (19 / 8)	64 / 49 (18 / 9)	66 / 50 (19 / 10)	69 / 53 (21 / 12)	72 / 55 (22 / 13)	72 / 56 (22 / 13)	73 / 58 (23 / 14)	74 / 57 (23 / 14)	72 / 54 (22 / 12)	65 / 49 (18 / 9)	58 / 45 (14 / 7)
San Francisco	57 / 46 (14 / 8)	60 / 48 (16 / 9)	62 / 49 (17 / 9)	63 / 49 (17 / 9)	64 / 51 (18 / 11)	66 / 53 (19 / 12)	66 / 54 (19 / 12)	68 / 55 (20 / 13)	70 / 55 (21 / 13)	69 / 54 (21 / 12)	63 / 50 (17 / 10)	57 / 46 (14 / 8)
San Jose	58 / 42 (14 / 6)	62 / 45 (17 / 7)	66 / 47 (19 / 8)	69 / 49 (21 / 9)	74 / 52 (23 / 11)	79 / 56 (26 / 13)	82 / 58 (28 / 14)	82 / 58 (28 / 14)	80 / 57 (27 / 14)	74 / 53 (23 / 12)	64 / 46 (18 / 8)	58 / 42 (14 / 6)
Santa Rosa	59 / 39 (15 / 4)	63 / 41 (17 / 5)	67 / 43 (19 / 6)	70 / 45 (21 / 7)	75 / 48 (24 / 9)	80 / 52 (27 / 11)	82 / 52 (28 / 11)	83 / 53 (28 / 12)	83 / 52 (28 / 11)	78 / 48 (26 / 9)	67 / 43 (19 / 6)	59 / 39 (15 / 4)

=== Ecology ===
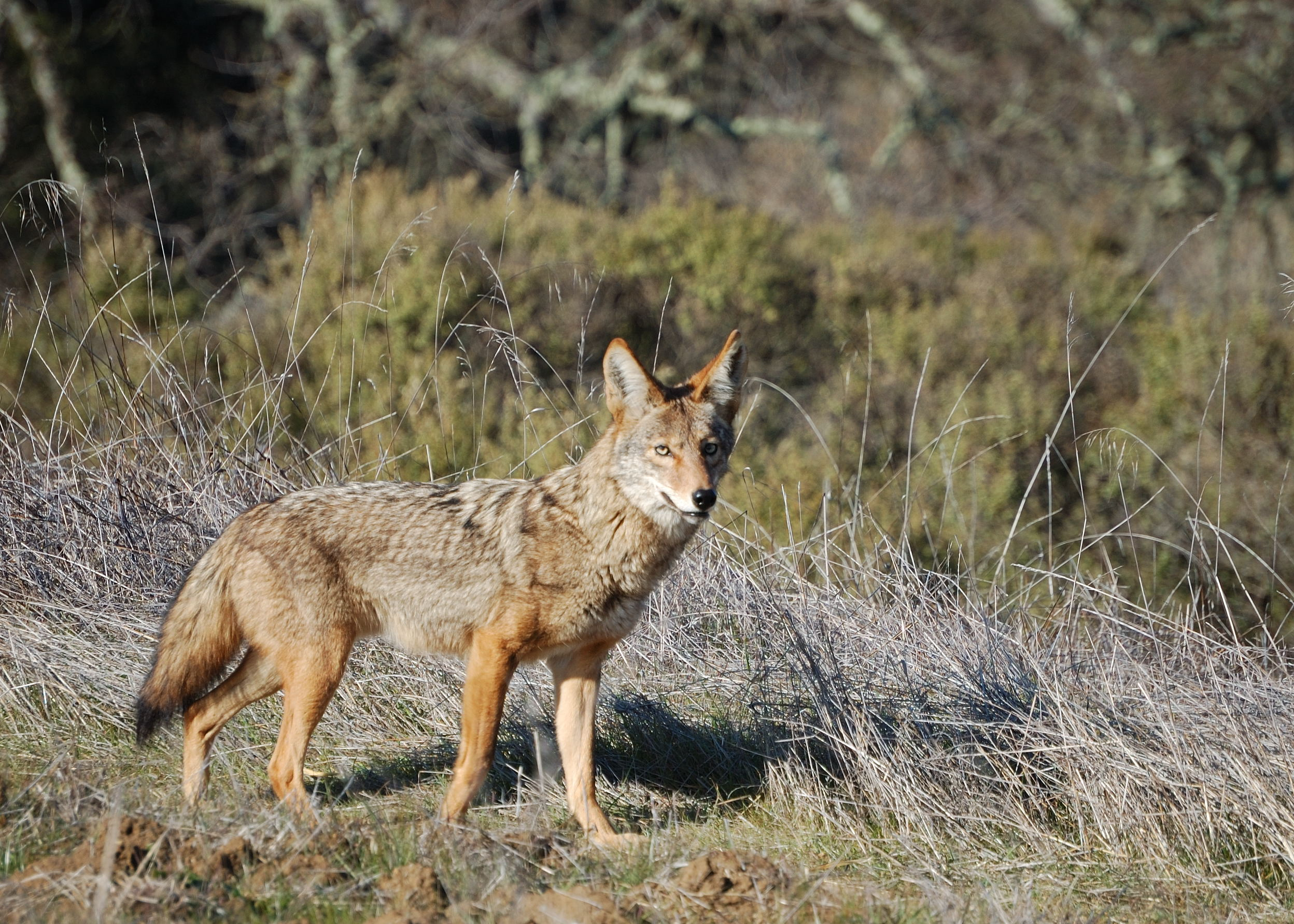
Coyote in the Arastradero Preserve

==== Marine wildlife ====
The Bay Area is home to a diverse array of wildlife and, along with the connected San Joaquin River Delta represents one of California's most important ecological habitats. California's Dungeness crab, Pacific halibut, and the California scorpionfish are all significant components of the bay's fisheries. The bay's salt marshes now represent most of California's remaining salt marsh and support a number of endangered species and provide key ecosystem services such as filtering pollutants and sediments from the rivers. Most famously, the bay is a key link in the Pacific Flyway and with millions of shorebirds annually visiting the bay shallows as a refuge, is the most important component of the flyway south of Alaska. Many endangered species of birds are also found here: the California least tern, the California clapper rail, the snowy egret, and the black crowned night heron.

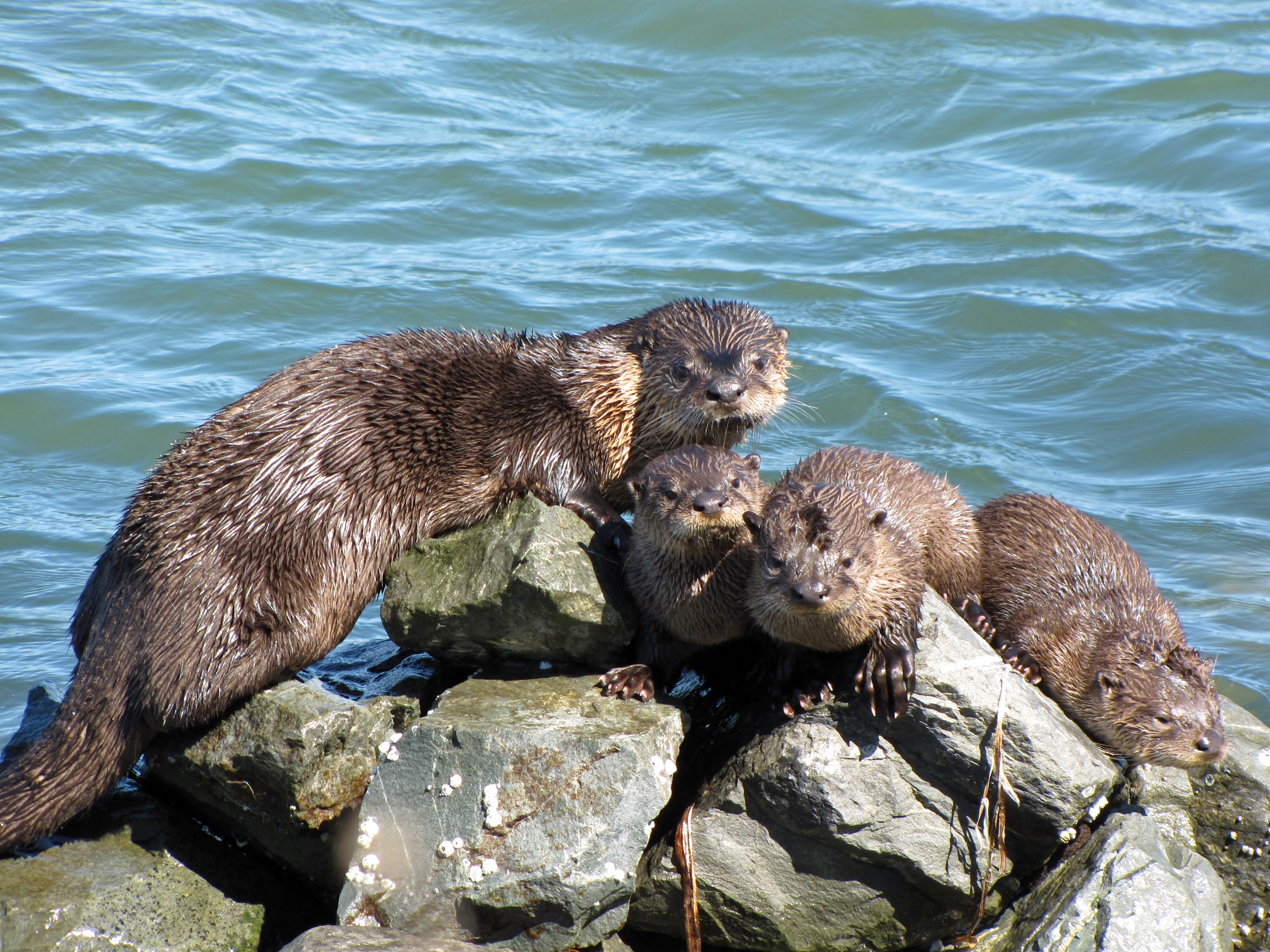
River otters sunning on rocks in the Inner Harbor of Richmond

There is also a significant diversity of salmonids present in the bay. Steelhead populations in California have dramatically declined due to human and natural causes; in the Bay Area, all naturally spawned anadromous steelhead populations below natural and manmade impassable barriers in California streams from the Russian River to Aptos Creek, and the drainages of San Francisco, San Pablo, and Suisun Bays are listed as threatened under the Federal Endangered Species Act. The Central California Coast coho salmon population is the most endangered of the many troubled salmon populations on the west coast of the United States, including populations residing in tributaries to San Francisco Bay. California Coast Chinook salmon were historically native to the Guadalupe River in San Francisco Bay, and Chinook salmon runs persist today in the Guadalupe River, Coyote Creek, Napa River, and Walnut Creek. Industrial, mining, and other uses of mercury have resulted in a widespread distribution of that poisonous metal in the bay, with uptake in the bay's phytoplankton and contamination of its sportfish.

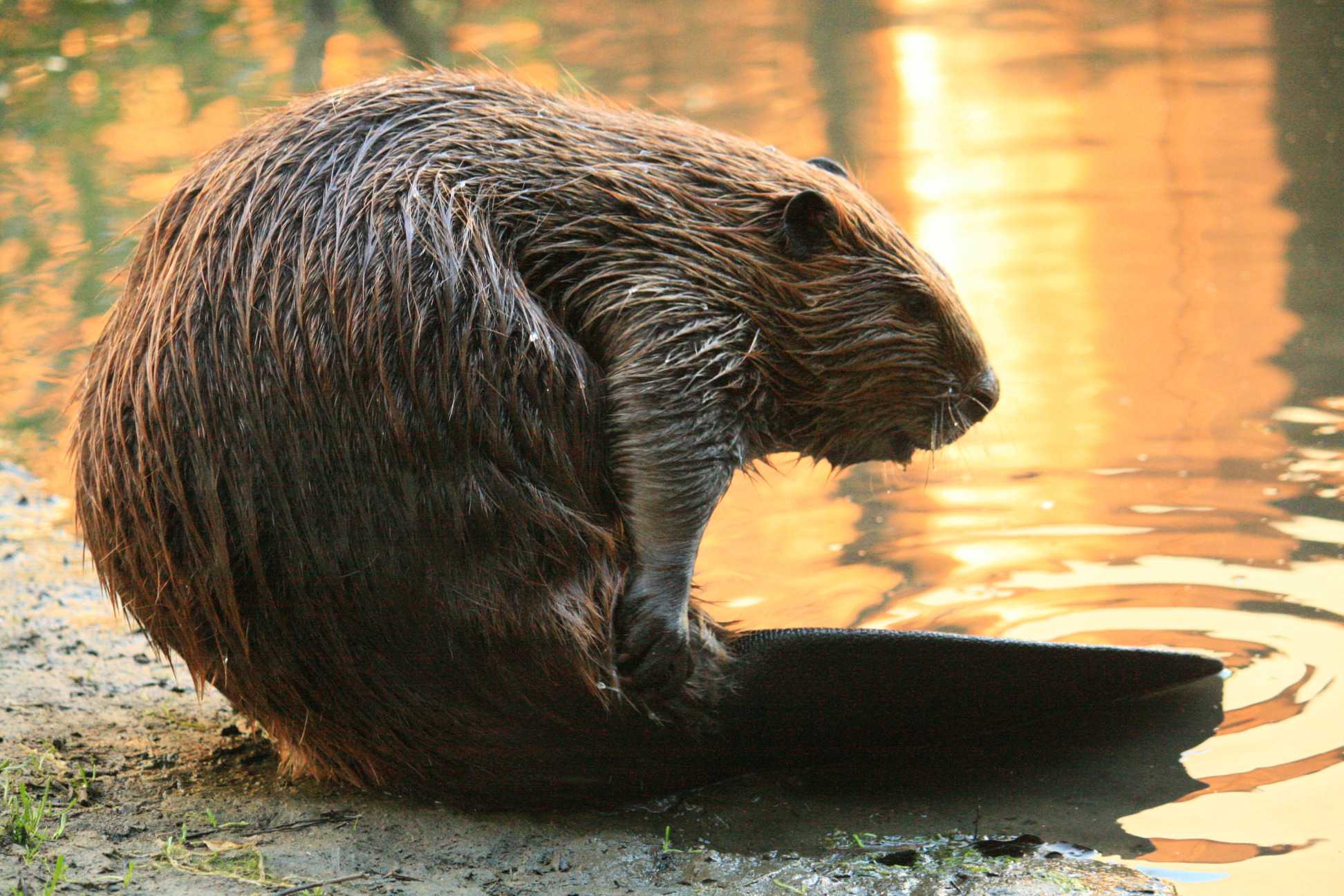
Martinez beaver in Alhambra Creek

Aquatic mammals are also present in the bay. Before 1825, Spanish, French, English, Russians and Americans were drawn to the Bay Area to harvest prodigious quantities of beaver, river otter, marten, fisher, mink, fox, weasel, harbor and fur seals and sea otter. This early fur trade, known as the California Fur Rush, was more than any other single factor, responsible for opening up the West and the San Francisco Bay Area, in particular, to world trade. By 1817 sea otter in the area were practically eliminated. Since then, the California golden beaver re-established a presence in Alhambra Creek, followed by the Napa River and Sonoma Creek in the north, and the Guadalupe River and Coyote Creek in the south. The North American river otter which was first reported in Redwood Creek at Muir Beach in 1996, has since been spotted in the North Bay's Corte Madera Creek, the South Bay's Coyote Creek, as well as in 2010 in San Francisco Bay itself at the Richmond Marina. Other mammals include the internationally famous sea lions who began inhabiting San Francisco's Pier 39 after the 1989 Loma Prieta earthquake and the locally famous Humphrey the Whale, a humpback whale who entered San Francisco Bay twice on errant migrations in the late 1980s and early 1990s. Bottlenose dolphins and harbor porpoises have recently returned to the bay, having been absent for many decades. Historically, this was the northern extent of their warm-water species range.

==== Birds ====
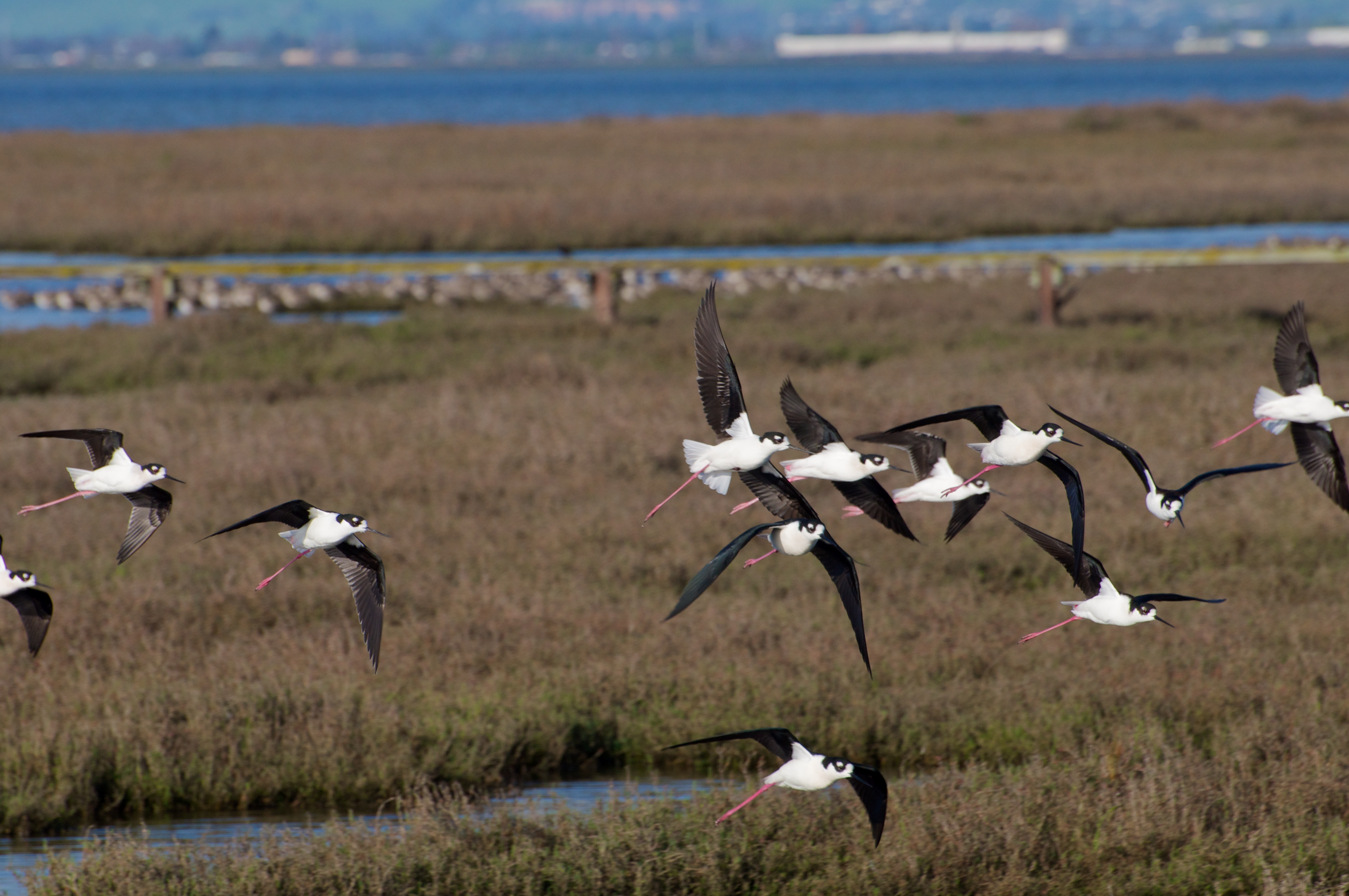
Black-necked stilts in flight at the Baylands Nature Preserve

In addition to the many species of marine birds that can be seen in the Bay Area, many other species of birds make the Bay Area their home, making the region a popular destination for birdwatching. Many birds are listed as endangered species despite once being common in the region.

Western burrowing owls were originally listed as a species of special concern by the California Department of Fish and Game in 1979. California's population declined 60% from the 1980s to the early 1990s, and continues to decline at roughly 8% per year. A 1992–93 survey reported little to no breeding burrowing owls in most of the western counties in the Bay Area, leaving only Alameda, Contra Costa, and Solano counties as remnants of a once large breeding range.

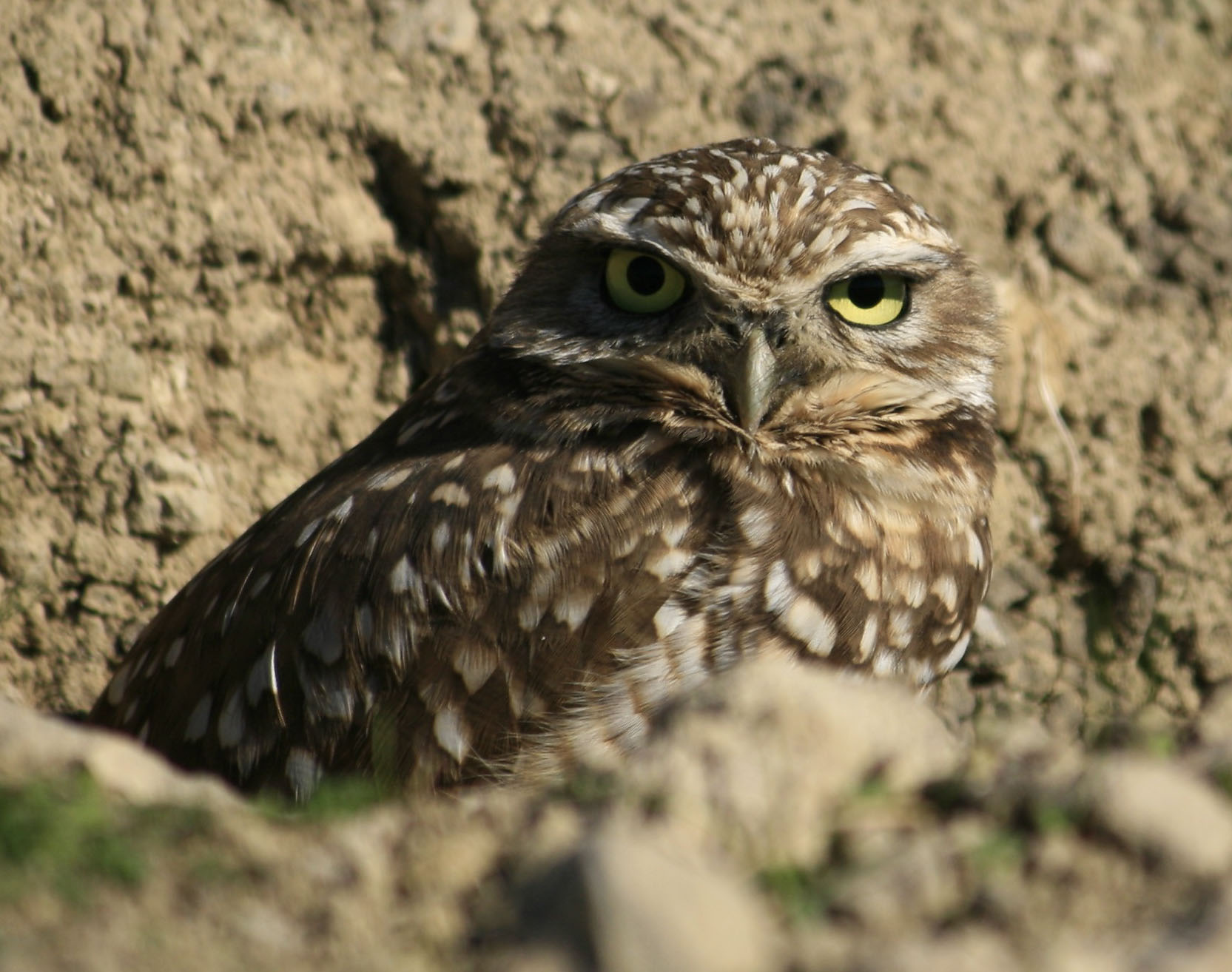
A burrowing owl in Antioch

Bald eagles were once common in the Bay Area, but habitat destruction and thinning of eggs from DDT poisoning reduced the California state population to 35 nesting pairs. Bald eagles disappeared from the Bay Area in 1915, and only began returning in recent years. In the 1980s an effort to re-introduce the species to the area began with the Santa Cruz Predatory Bird Research Group and the San Francisco Zoo importing birds and eggs from Vancouver Island and northeastern California, and there are now nineteen nesting couples in eight of the Bay Area's nine counties. Other once absent species that have returned to the Bay Area include Swainson's hawk, white tailed kite, and the osprey.

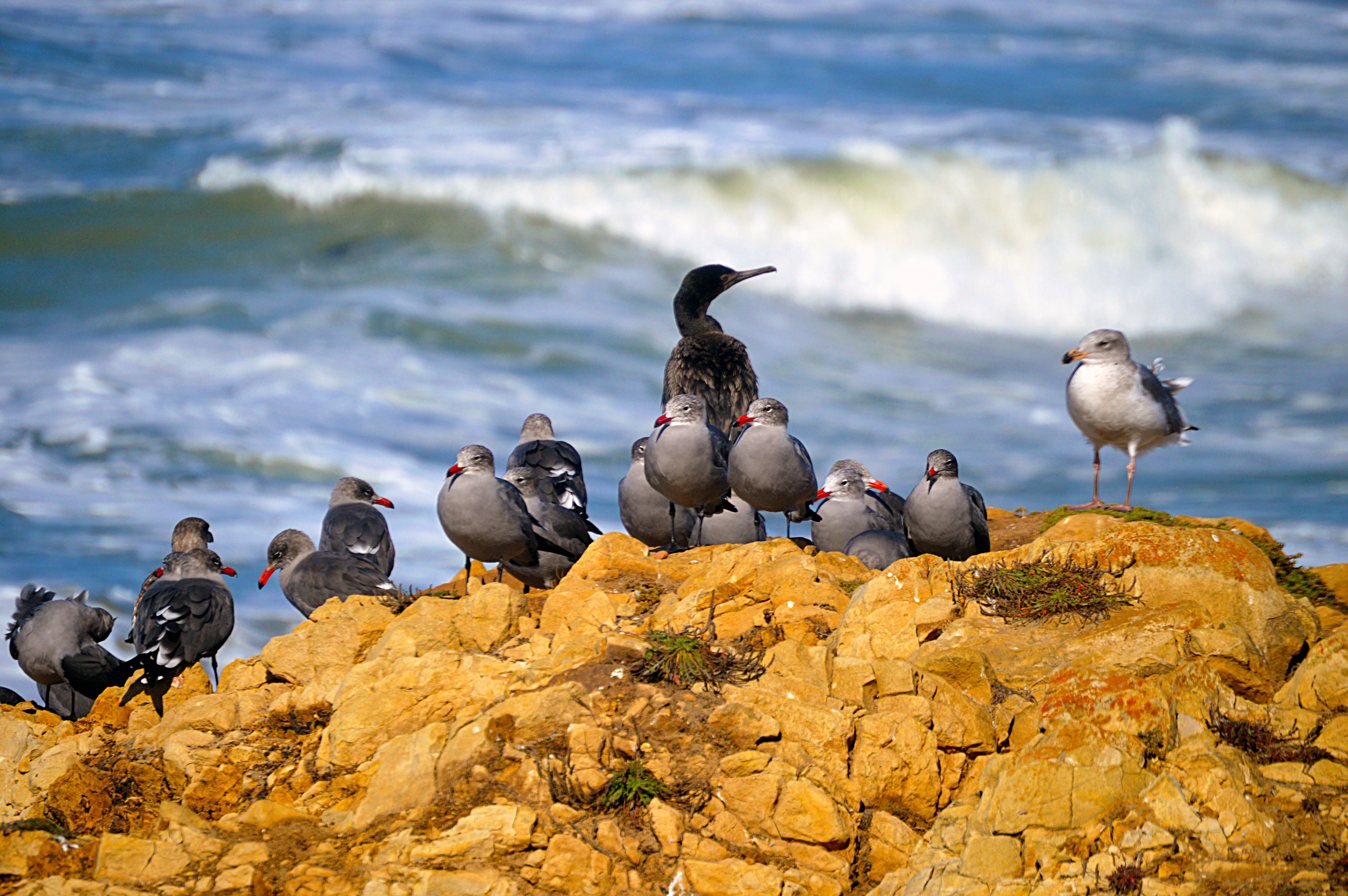
Heermann's gulls with a double crested cormorant and a Western gull at Point Reyes National Seashore

In 1927, zoologist Joseph Grinnell wrote that osprey were only rare visitors to the San Francisco Bay Area, although he noted records of one or two used nests in the broken tops of redwood trees along the Russian River. In 1989, the southern breeding range of the osprey in the Bay Area was Kent Lake, although osprey were noted to be extending their range further south in the Central Valley and the Sierra Nevada. In 2014, a Bay Area-wide survey found osprey had extended their breeding range southward with nesting sites as far south as Hunters Point in San Francisco on the west side and Hayward on the east side, while further studies have found nesting sites as far south as the Los Gatos Creek watershed, indicating that the nesting range now includes the entire length of San Francisco Bay. Most nests were built on man-made structures close to areas of human disturbance, likely due to lack of mature trees near the Bay. The wild turkey population was introduced in the 1960s by state game officials, and by 2015 have become a common sight in East Bay communities.

=== Geology and landforms ===
Satellite photo of the Bay Area taken in March 2019. The gray areas are signs of urbanization and represent the most populated areas.

The Bay Area is well known for the complexity of its landforms that are the result of the forces of plate tectonics acting over of millions of years, since the region is located in the middle of a meeting point between two plates. Nine out of eleven distinct assemblages have been identified in a single county, Alameda. Diverse assemblages adjoin in complex arrangements due to offsets along the many faults (both active and stable) in the area. As a consequence, many types of rock and soil are found in the region. The oldest rocks are metamorphic rocks that are associated with granite in the Salinian Block west of the San Andreas Fault. These were formed from sedimentary rocks of sandstone, limestone, and shale in uplifted seabeds. Volcanic deposits also exist in the Bay Area, left behind by the movement of the San Andreas Fault, whose movement sliced a subduction plate and allowed magma to briefly flow to the surface.

The region has considerable vertical relief in its landscapes that are not in the alluvial plains leading to the bay or in the inland valleys. The topography, and geologic history, of the Bay Area can largely be attributed to the compressive forces between the Pacific Plate and the North American plate.

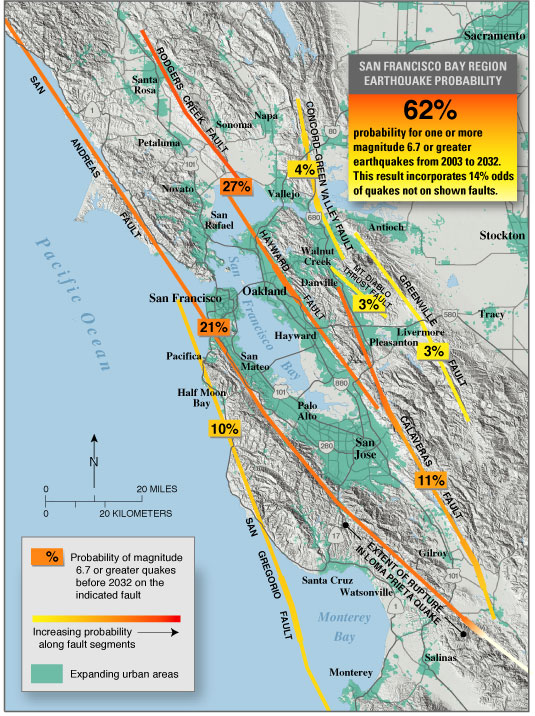
A map displaying each of the seven major fault lines in the Bay Area and the probability of an M6.7 or higher earthquake occurring between 2003 and 2032

The three major ridge structures in the Bay Area, part of the Pacific Coast Range, are all roughly parallel to the major faults. The Santa Cruz Mountains along the San Francisco Peninsula and the Marin Hills in Marin County follow the San Andreas fault, The Berkeley Hills, San Leandro Hills and their southern ridgeline extension through Mission Peak roughly follow the Hayward fault, and the Diablo Range, which includes Mount Diablo and Mount Hamilton and runs along the Calaveras fault.

In total, the Bay Area is traversed by seven major fault systems with hundreds of related faults, all of which are stressed by the relative motion between the Pacific Plate and the North American Plate or by compressive stresses between these plates. The fault systems include the Hayward Fault Zone, Concord-Green Valley Fault, Calaveras Fault, Clayton-Marsh Creek-Greenville Fault, Rodgers Creek Fault, and the San Gregorio Fault. Significant blind thrust faults (faults with near vertical motion and no surface ruptures) are associated with portions of the Santa Cruz Mountains and the northern reaches of the Diablo Range and Mount Diablo. These "hidden" faults, which are not as well known, pose a significant earthquake hazard. Among the more well-understood faults, as of 2014, scientists estimate a 72% probability of a magnitude 6.7 earthquake occurring along either the Hayward, Rogers Creek, or San Andreas fault, with an earthquake more likely to occur in the East Bay's Hayward Fault. Two of the largest earthquakes in recent history were the 1906 San Francisco earthquake and the 1989 Loma Prieta earthquake.

=== Hydrography ===
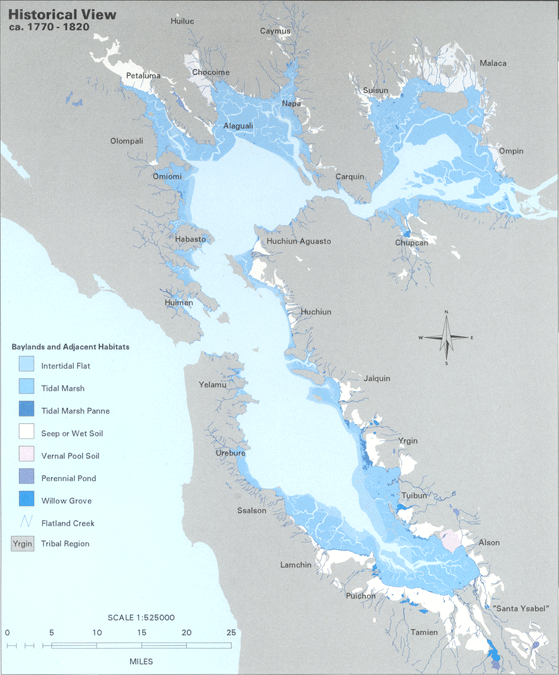
A map of the water features in the San Francisco Bay Area, including the bay and adjacent marshes, ponds, and tributaries

The Bay Area is home to a complex network of watersheds, marshes, rivers, creeks, reservoirs, and bays that predominantly drain into the San Francisco Bay and Pacific Ocean. The largest bodies of water in the Bay Area are the San Francisco, San Pablo, and Suisun estuaries. Major rivers of the North Bay include the Napa River, the Petaluma River, the Gualala River, and the Russian River; the former two drain into San Pablo Bay, the latter two into the Pacific Ocean. In the South Bay, the Guadalupe River drains into San Francisco Bay near Alviso. There are also several lakes present in the Bay Area, including man-made lakes like Lake Berryessa and natural albeit heavily modified lakes like Lake Merritt.

Prior to the introduction of European agricultural methods, the shores of San Francisco Bay consisted mostly of tidal marshes. Today, the bay has been significantly altered heavily re-engineered to accommodate the needs of water delivery, shipping, agriculture, and urban development, with side effects including the loss of wetlands and the introduction of contaminants and invasive species. Approximately 85% of those marshes have been lost or destroyed, but about 50 marshes and marsh fragments remain. Huge tracts of the marshes were originally destroyed by farmers for agricultural purposes, then repurposed to serve as salt evaporation ponds to produce salt for food and other purposes. Today, regulations limit the destruction of tidal marshes, and large portions are currently being rehabilitated to their natural state.

Over time, droughts and wildfires have increased in frequency and become less seasonal and more year-round, further straining the region's water security.

== Demographics ==
Historical population
Census	Pop.	Note	%±
1860	114,074		—
1870	265,808		133.0%
1880	422,128		58.8%
1890	547,618		29.7%
1900	658,111		20.2%
1910	925,708		40.7%
1920	1,182,911		27.8%
1930	1,578,009		33.4%
1940	1,734,308		9.9%
1950	2,681,322		54.6%
1960	3,638,939		35.7%
1970	4,628,199		27.2%
1980	5,179,784		11.9%
1990	6,023,577		16.3%
2000	6,783,760		12.6%
2010	7,150,739		5.4%
2020	7,765,640		8.6%
Note: Nine-County Population Totals

Population density in the San Francisco Bay Area

Maps of racial distribution according to 2010 U.S. Census. Each dot is 25 people: White, Black, Asian, Hispanic, or Other (yellow)

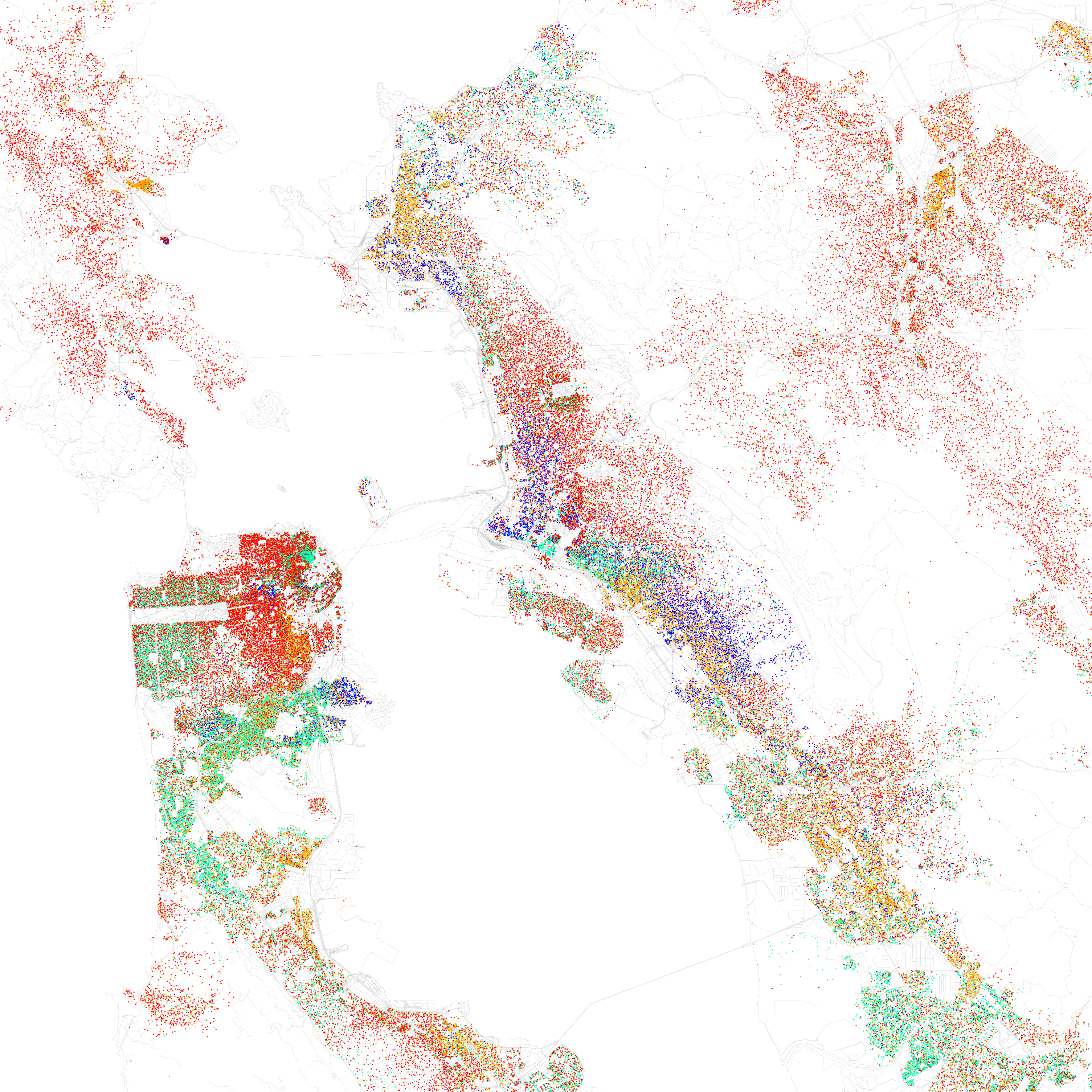
San Francisco and Oakland

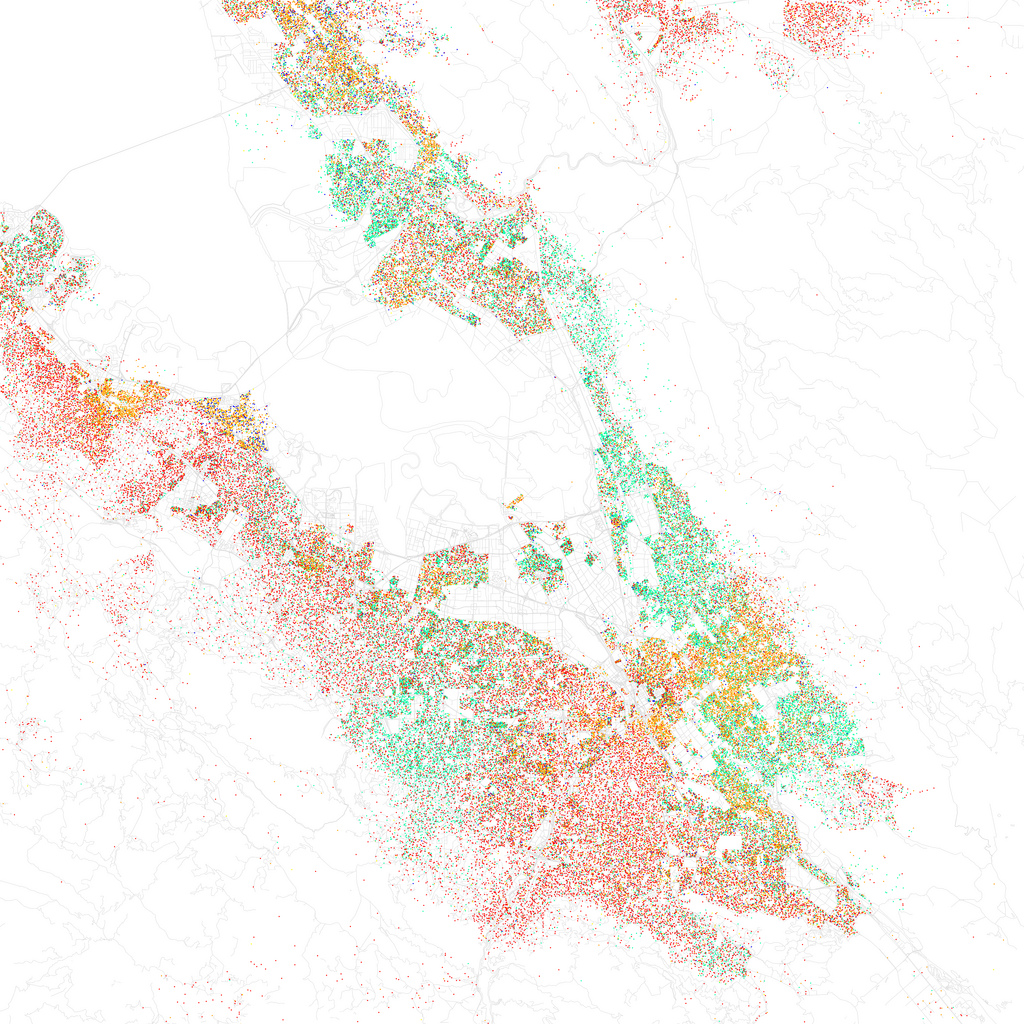
San Jose

According to the 2020 United States census, the population of the nine-county Bay Area was 7.76 million, with 49.6% male and 50.4% female. The racial makeup was 35.8% White (non-Hispanic), 27.7% Asian, 24.4% Hispanic or Latino (of any race), 5.6% non-Hispanic Black or African American, 0.5% Pacific Islander, 0.2% Native American or Alaska Native, 5.7% two or more races. In 2017, approximately 2.3 million Bay Area residents were foreign born (30% of 2020 census population). Demographically, the San Francisco Bay Area's population has the third-oldest median age in the U.S., following two Florida metros, and the Bay Area is the fastest-aging of any metropolitan area.

Non-Hispanic whites form majorities of the population in Marin, Napa, and Sonoma counties. Whites also make up the majority in the eastern regions of the East Bay centered around the Lamorinda and Tri-Valley areas. Like much of the U.S., the Bay Area has a large Irish population, and this is reflected in the Richmond District area of San Francisco. San Jose has a Little Portugal, and San Francisco's North Beach district, now considered the Little Italy of the city, was once home to a significant Italian-American community. San Francisco, Marin County and the Lamorinda area all have substantial Jewish communities. There is a Little Russia community in northwestern San Francisco, and there are Russian communities throughout the Bay Area, especially in San Mateo County and Santa Clara County; there are also Eastern European American groups such as Ukrainians and Poles in dozens of thousands to hundreds of thousands especially in San Francisco and in the Peninsula, including recent immigrants and American-born citizens of Eastern European descent. There are numerous Russian-, Ukrainian-, and Polish-speaking churches in San Francisco, the South Bay, the East Bay, and on the Peninsula.

The Latino population is spread throughout the Bay Area, but among the nine counties, the greatest number live in Santa Clara County, while Contra Costa County has seen the highest growth rate. The largest Hispanic or Latino groups were those of Mexican (17.9%), Salvadoran (1.3%), Guatemalan (0.6%), Puerto Rican (0.6%) and Nicaraguan (0.5%) ancestry. Mexican Americans make up the largest share of Hispanic residents in Napa county, while Central Americans make up the largest share in San Francisco, many of whom live in the Mission District which is home to many residents of Salvadoran and Guatemalan descent.

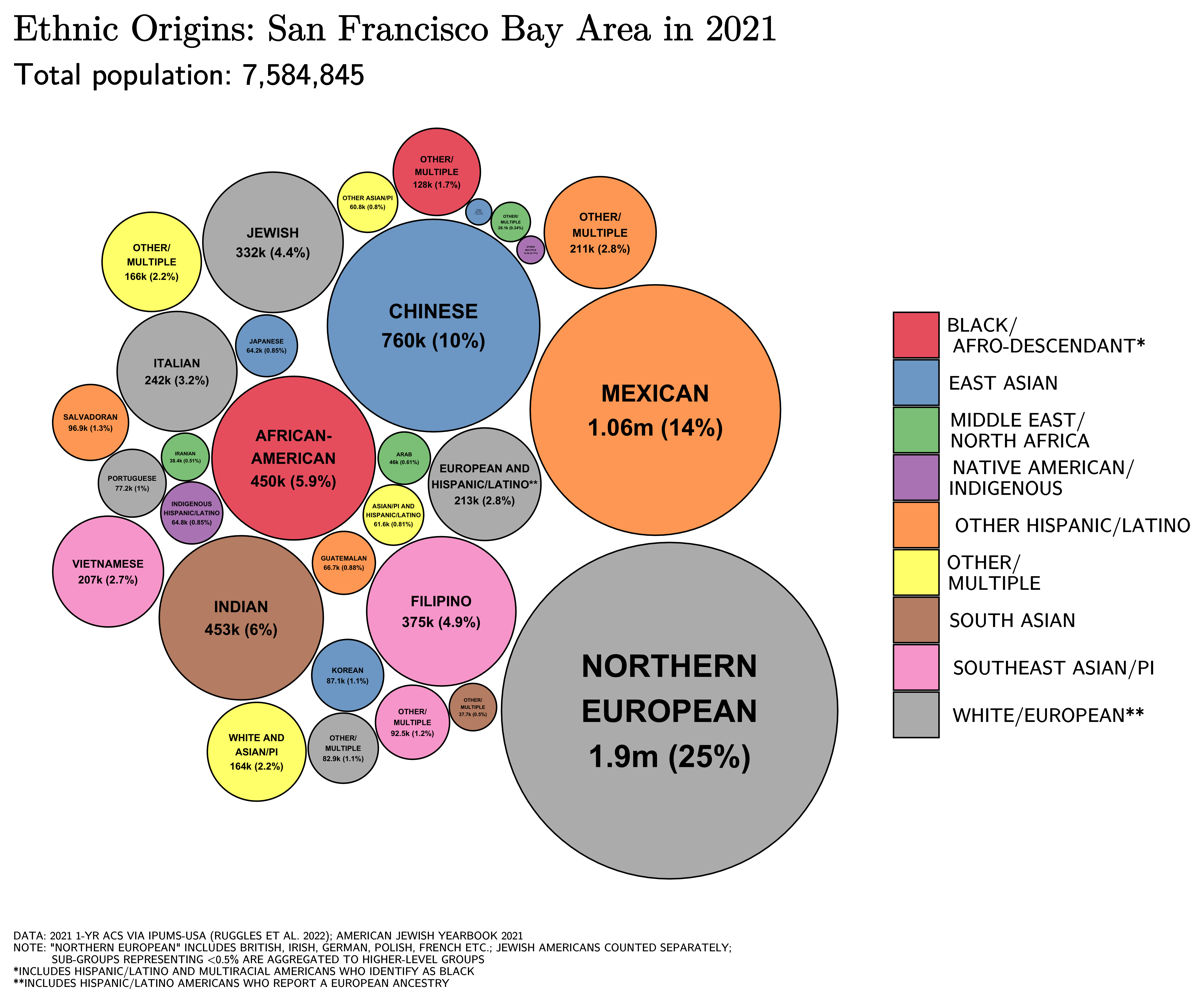
Ethnic origins in the Bay Area

The Asian-American population in the Bay Area is one of the largest in North America. Asian-Americans make up the plurality in two major counties in the Bay Area: Santa Clara County and Alameda County. The largest Asian-American groups were those of Chinese (7.9%), Filipino (5.1%), Indian (3.3%), Vietnamese (2.5%), and Japanese (0.9%) heritage. Asian Americans also constitute a majority in Cupertino, Fremont, Milpitas, Union City and significant populations in Dublin, Foster City, Hercules, Millbrae, San Ramon, Saratoga, Sunnyvale and Santa Clara. The cities of San Jose and San Francisco had the third and fourth most Asian-American residents in the United States. In San Francisco, Chinese Americans constitute 21.4% of the population and constitute the single largest ethnic group in the city. The Bay Area is home to over 382,950 Filipino Americans, one of the largest communities of Filipino people outside of the Philippines with the largest proportion of Filipino Americans concentrating themselves within American Canyon, Daly City, Fairfield, Hercules, South San Francisco, Union City and Vallejo. Santa Clara county, and increasingly the East Bay, house a significant Indian American community. There are more than 100,000 people of Vietnamese ancestry residing within San Jose city limits, the largest Vietnamese population of any city proper outside Vietnam. In addition, there is a sizable community of Korean Americans in Santa Clara county, where San Jose is located. East Bay cities such as Richmond, San Pablo, and Oakland, and the North Bay city of Santa Rosa, have plentiful populations of Laotian and Cambodians in certain neighborhoods.

Pacific Islanders such as Samoans and Tongans have the largest presence in East Palo Alto, where they constitute over 7% of the population. San Bruno also has a large Tongan population and so does San Mateo and South San Francisco, which also have smaller communities of Samoans. The Visitacion Valley has a designated Pacific Islander district and Samoan and Tongans have a presence in Southeast San Francisco and Daly City's Bayshore neighborhood.

The African-American population of San Francisco was formerly substantial, had a thriving jazz scene and was known as "Harlem of the West." While black residents formed one-seventh of the city's population in 1970, today they have mostly moved to parts of the East Bay and North Bay, including Antioch, Fairfield and out of the Bay Area entirely. The South Park neighborhood of Santa Rosa was once home to a primarily black community until the 1980s, when many Latino immigrants settled in the area. Other cities with large numbers of African Americans include Vallejo (28%), Richmond (26%), East Palo Alto (17%) and the CDP of Marin City (38%). Suisun City and Vacaville both have African American populations that have accelerated in population since the 2000s. There are also Eritrean, Ethiopian and Nigerian communities.

There is also a significant Middle Eastern and Balkan population. There are 4,000 Armenians in San Francisco, and some in the San Jose area. Around a thousand residents are Azerbaijanis. The San Jose area, especially the Campbell area and some areas off of San Jose's Stevens Creek Blvd contain a Bosnian community. There are several thousand Turks in San Francisco, and a Palestinian population is concentrated in Daly City and San Francisco.

Since the economy of the Bay Area heavily relies on innovation and high-tech skills, a relatively educated population exists in the region. Roughly 87.4% of Bay Area residents have attained a high school degree or higher, while 46% of adults in the Bay Area have earned a post-secondary degree or higher.

As of 2025, the San Francisco Bay Area's population has the third-oldest median age of U.S. metropolitan regions and is the fastest-aging of any metropolitan area in the U.S.

Counties by population and ethnicity
County	Type	Population	White	Other	Asian	African	Native	Hispanic
Alameda	County	1,494,876	46.2%	13.8%	26.2%	12.5%	1.3%	22.2%
Contra Costa	County	1,037,817	63.2%	12.5%	14.3%	9.1%	0.5%	23.9%
Marin	County	250,666	79.9%	11.0%	5.6%	3.0%	0.2%	14.0%
Napa	County	135,377	81.3%	8.9%	6.8%	2.0%	0.3%	31.5%
San Francisco	City and county	870,887	48.5%	11.3%	33.3%	6.1%	0.9%	15.1%
San Mateo	County	711,622	59.6%	11.1%	24.6%	2.9%	1.8%	24.9%
Santa Clara	County	1,762,754	50.9%	13.8%	31.8%	2.6%	0.4%	26.6%
Solano	County	411,620	52.1%	17.6%	14.4%	14.6%	1.4%	23.6%
Sonoma	County	478,551	81.6%	11.3%	4.0%	1.2%	1.5%	24.3%

Counties by population and income
County	Type	Population	Per capita income	Median household income	Median family income
Alameda	County	1,494,876	$34,937	$70,821	$87,012
Contra Costa	County	1,037,817	$38,141	$79,135	$93,437
Marin	County	250,666	$54,605	$89,605	$113,826
Napa	County	135,377	$35,309	$68,641	$79,884
San Francisco	City and county	870,887	$46,777	$72,947	$87,329
San Mateo	County	711,622	$45,346	$87,633	$104,370
Santa Clara	County	1,762,754	$40,698	$89,064	$103,255
Solano	County	411,620	$29,367	$69,914	$79,316
Sonoma	County	478,551	$33,119	$64,343	$78,227

=== Affluence ===
The Bay Area is the wealthiest region per capita in the United States, due primarily to the economic power engines of San Jose, San Francisco, and Oakland. The Bay Area city of Pleasanton has the second-highest household income in the country after New Canaan, Connecticut. However, discretionary income is very comparable with the rest of the country, primarily because the higher cost of living offsets the increased income.

By 2014, the Bay Area's wealth gap was considerable: the top ten percent of income-earners took home over eleven times as much as the bottom ten percent, and a Brookings Institution study found the San Francisco metro area, which excludes four Bay Area counties, to be the third most unequal urban area in the country. Among the wealthy, forty-seven Bay Area residents made Forbes magazine's 400 richest Americans list, published in 2007.

=== Crime ===
Statistics regarding crime rates in the Bay Area generally fall into two categories: violent crime and property crime. Historically, violent crime has been concentrated in a few cities in the East Bay, namely Oakland, Richmond, Martinez, and Antioch, but also in East Palo Alto within the Peninsula, Vallejo in the North Bay, and San Francisco. Nationally, Oakland's murder rate ranked 18th among cities with over 100,000 residents, and third for violent crimes per capita. According to a 2015 Federal Bureau of Investigation report, Oakland was also the source of the most violent crime in the Bay Area, with 16.9 reported incidents per thousand people. Vallejo came in second, at 8.7 incidents per thousand people, while San Pablo, Antioch, and San Francisco rounded out the top five. East Palo Alto, which used to have the Bay Area's highest murder rate, saw violent crime incidents drop 65% between 2013 and 2014, while Oakland saw violent crime incidents drop 15%. Meanwhile, San Jose, which was one of the safest large cities in the United States in the early 2000s, has seen its violent crime rates trend upwards. Cities with the lowest rate of violent crime include the Peninsula cities of Los Altos and Foster City, East Bay cities of San Ramon and Danville, and southern foothill cities of Saratoga and Cupertino. In 2015, 45 Bay Area cities counted zero homicides, the largest of which was Daly City.

In 2015, Oakland also saw the highest rates of property crime in the Bay Area, at 59.4 incidents per thousand residents, with San Francisco following close behind at 53 incidents per thousand residents. The East Bay cities Pleasant Hill, Berkeley, and San Leandro rounded out the top five. Saratoga and Windsor saw the least rates of property crime. Additionally, San Francisco saw the most reports of arson.

Several street gangs operate in the Bay Area, including the Sureños and Norteños in San Francisco's Mission District. Oakland, which also sees organized gang violence, implemented Operation Ceasefire in 2012 in an effort to reduce the violence, with limited success.

== Economy ==
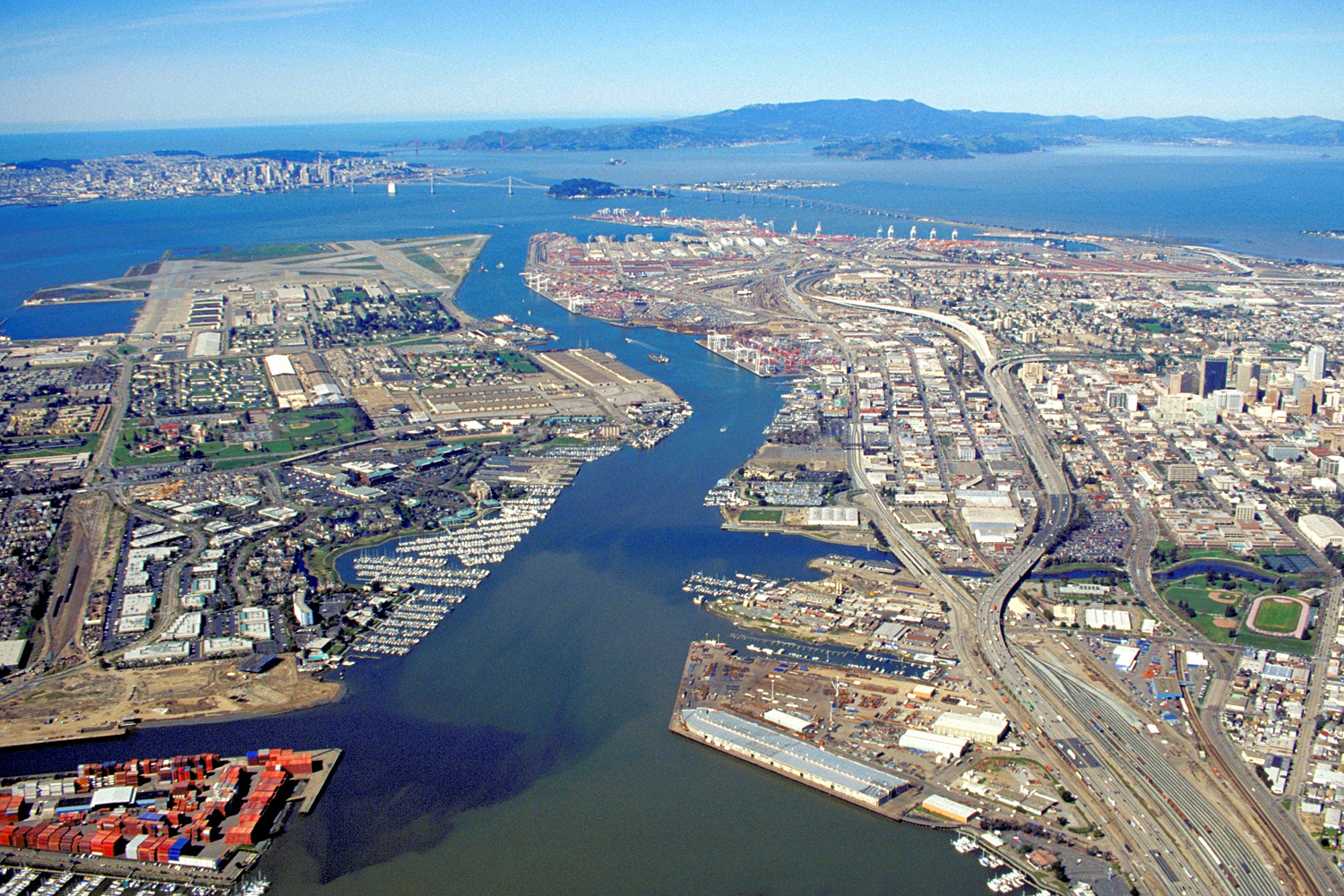
The Port of Oakland is the 36th busiest American port by tonnage.

The three principal cities of the Bay Area represent separate employment clusters and are dominated by different but commingled industries. The East Bay, centered around Oakland, is home to heavy industry, metalworking, oil, and shipping, while San Francisco hosts the region's financial industry, tourism, and numerous conventions. Santa Clara County, which is centered around San Jose and contains most of Silicon Valley, is the world's premier technology center. Furthermore, the North Bay is a major player in the country's agriculture and wine industry. In all, the Bay Area is home to the second-highest concentration of Fortune 500 companies, after the New York metropolitan area, with thirty such companies based throughout the region.

Jobs in the Bay Area by city and sector.

In 2024, the greater thirteen-county statistical area had a GDP of $1.408 trillion, the third-highest among combined statistical areas. The smaller nine-county Bay Area had a GDP of $1.332 trillion in the same year, which nonetheless would rank it fifth among U.S. states and 16th among countries.

The COVID-19 pandemic caused an exodus of businesses from the downtown cores of Oakland, San Francisco, and San Jose, as remote work became more widespread, especially in the tech and retail industries, and the area's locational relevance declined. Some observers have warned that this could lead to an economic doom loop for Bay Area cities, particularly San Francisco, while others have argued that these concerns are restricted to the downtown cores. Many retailers in Downtown San Francisco and Downtown Oakland have closed since 2020, with some citing complex challenges with visible homelessness and crime in the area. This exodus has slowed since 2024 as San Francisco has become the epicenter of AI development, with OpenAI and Anthropic headquartered in the city.

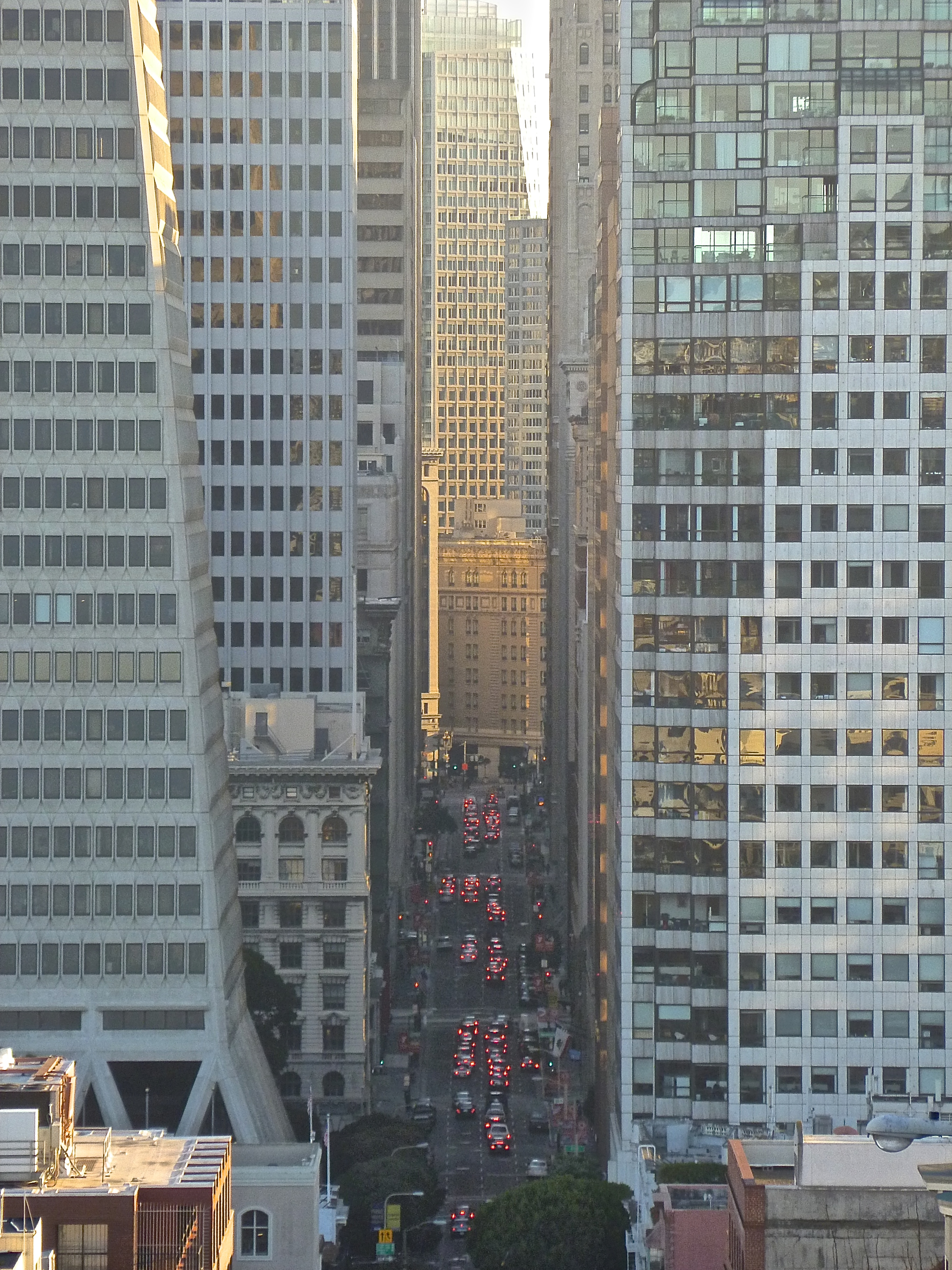
San Francisco's Financial District has been called the Wall Street of the West.

The Bay Area is home to five of the world's ten largest companies by market capitalization; and several major corporations are headquartered in the Bay Area, including Google, Facebook, Apple Inc., Clorox, Hewlett-Packard, Intel, Adobe Inc., Applied Materials, eBay, Cisco Systems, Symantec, Netflix, Sony Interactive Entertainment, Electronic Arts, and Salesforce; energy company PG&E; financial service company Visa Inc.; apparel retailers Gap Inc., Levi Strauss & Co., and Ross Stores; aerospace and defense contractor Lockheed Martin; local grocer Safeway; and biotechnology companies Genentech and Gilead Sciences. The largest manufacturers include Tesla Inc., Lam Research, Bayer, and Coca-Cola. The Port of Oakland is the fifth-largest container shipping port in the United States, and Oakland is also a major rail terminus. In research, NASA's Ames Research Center and the federal research facility Lawrence Livermore National Laboratory are based in Mountain View and Livermore, respectively. In the North Bay, Napa and Sonoma counties are well known for their wineries, including Fantesca Estate & Winery, Domaine Chandon California, and D'Agostini Winery.

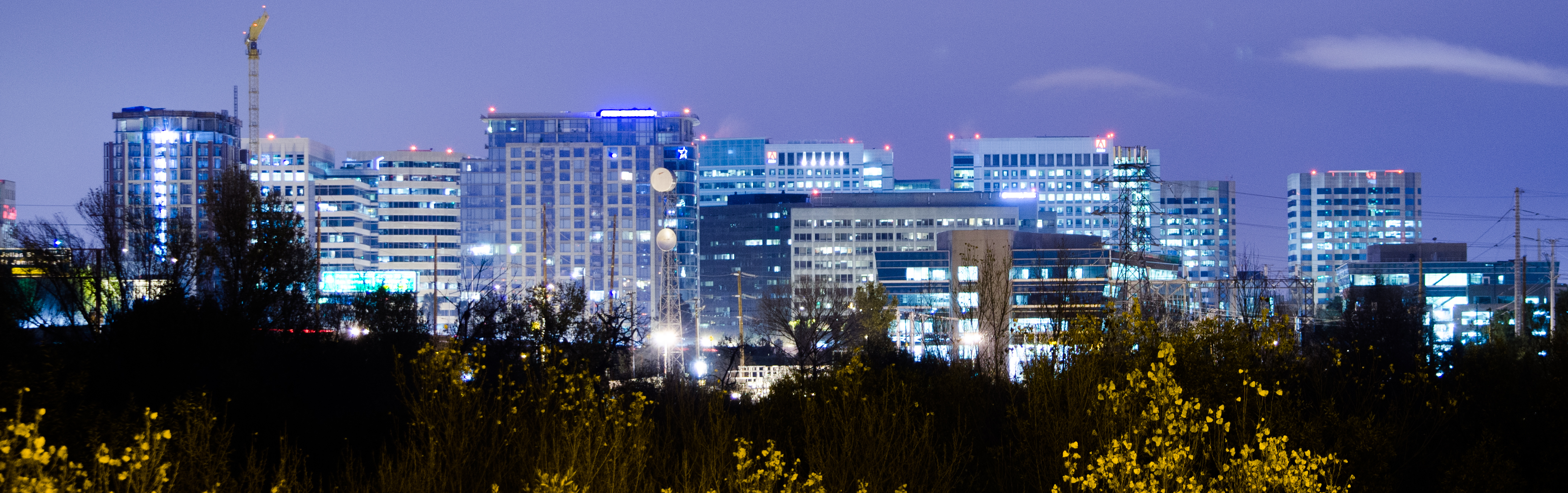
Silicon Valley is the largest tech hub in the world and home to Big Tech companies like Apple, Alphabet, Meta, Intel, Netflix, Uber, Nvidia, AMD, HP Inc., X Corp., Yahoo!, and others.

In spite of the San Francisco Bay Area's industries contributing to the aforementioned economic growth, there is a significant level of poverty in the region. Rising housing prices and gentrification in the San Francisco Bay Area are often framed as symptomatic of high-income tech workers moving in to previously low-income, underserved neighborhoods. Two notable policy strategies to prevent eviction due to rising rents include rent control and subsidies such as Section 8 and Shelter Plus Care. Moreover, in 2002, then San Francisco Supervisor Gavin Newsom introduced the "Care Not Cash" initiative, diverting funds away from cash handouts (which he argued encouraged drug use) to housing. This proved controversial, with some suggesting his rhetoric criminalized poverty, while others supporting the prioritizing of housing as a solution.

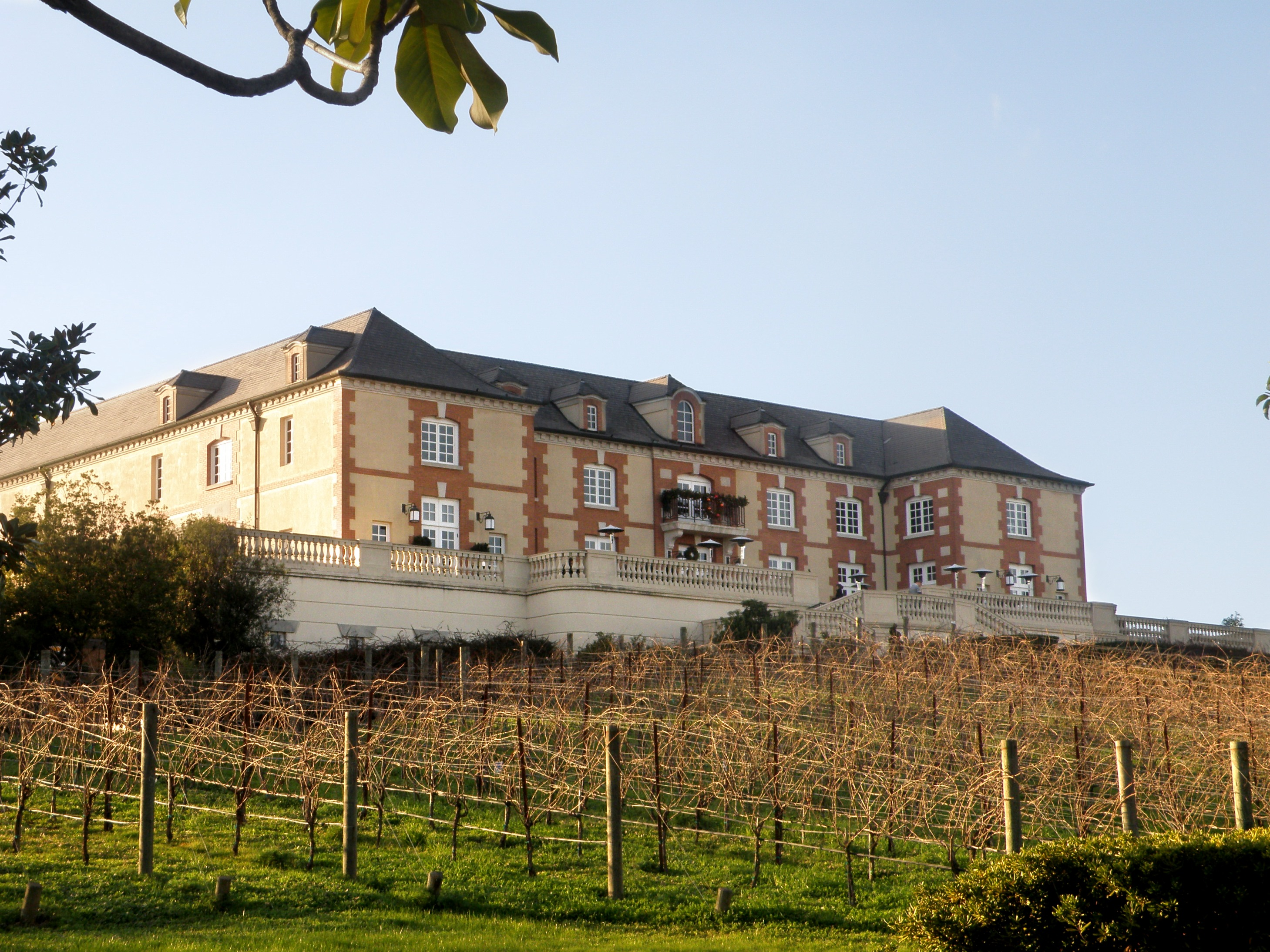
California's Wine Country, centered around Napa and Sonoma, is a world renowned wine-growing region.

Contrary to historical patterns of low incomes within the inner city, poverty rates in the Bay Area are shifting such that they are increasing more rapidly in suburban areas than in urban areas. It is not yet clear whether the suburbanization of poverty is due to the relocation of poor populations or shifting income levels in the respective regions. However, the mid-2000s housing boom encouraged city dwellers to move into the newly cheap houses in suburbs outside of the city, and these suburban housing developments were then most affected by the 2008 housing bubble burst. As such, people in poverty experience decreased access to transportation due to underdeveloped public transport infrastructure in suburban areas. Suburban poverty is most prevalent among Hispanics and Blacks, and affects native-born people more significantly than foreign-born.

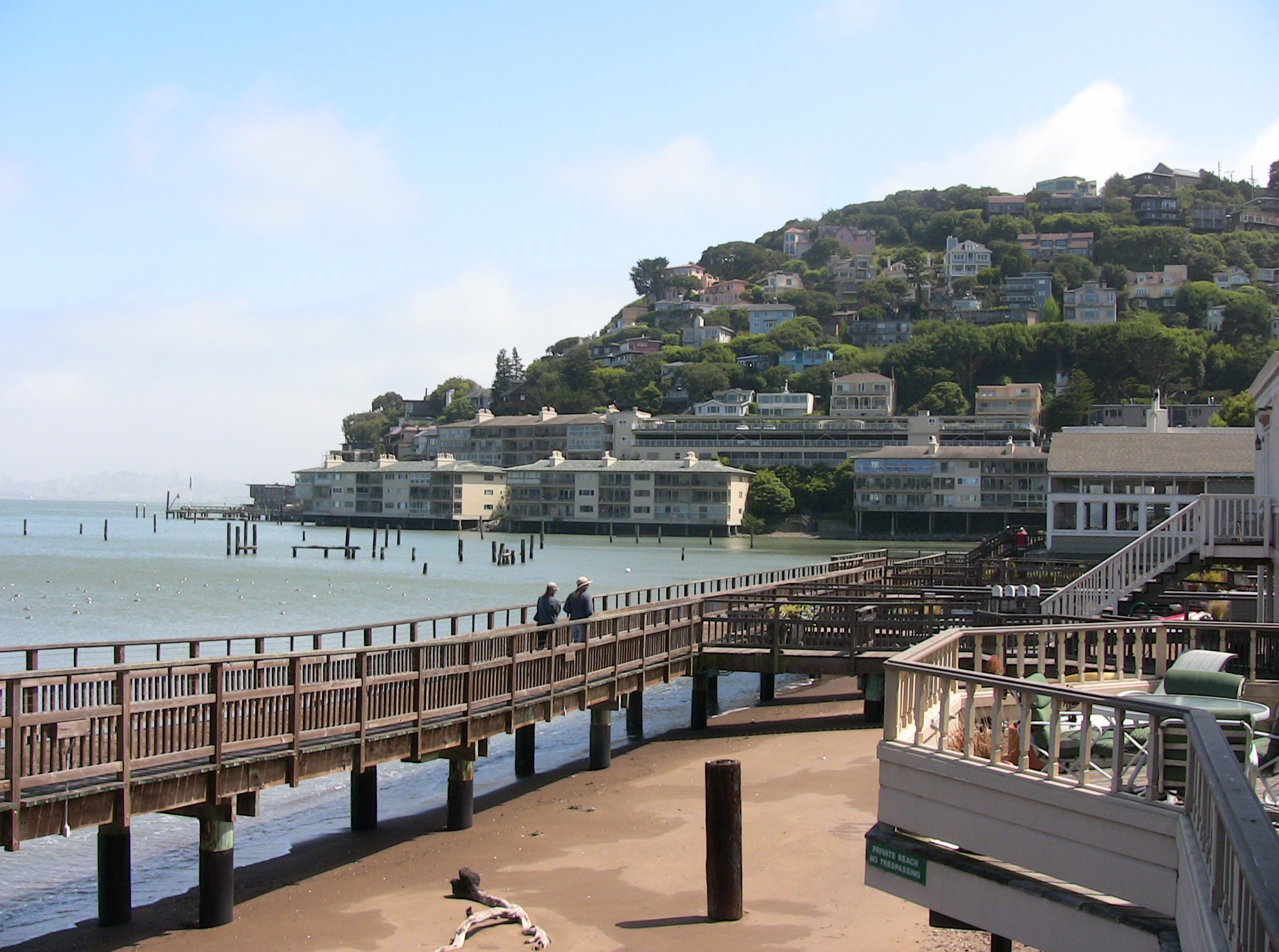
Sausalito, in the North Bay, is a popular tourist destination.

As greater proportions of their incomes are spent on rent and energy, many impoverished populations in the San Francisco Bay Area also face food insecurity and health setbacks.

== Housing ==
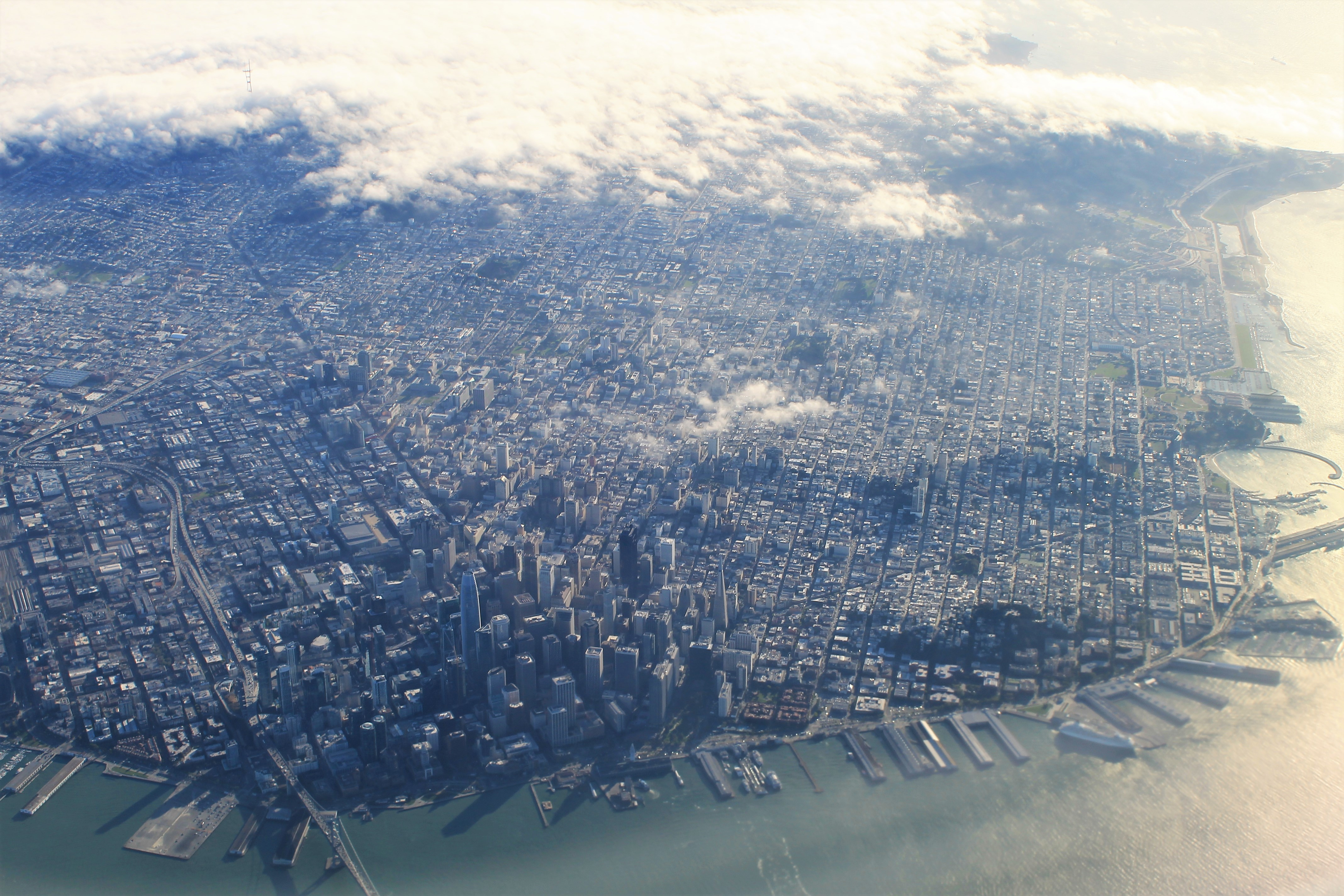
High density urbanism in northeastern San Francisco

The Bay Area is the most expensive location to live in the United States outside of Manhattan. Strong economic growth has created hundreds of thousands of jobs, but this coupled with severe zoning restrictions on building new housing units, has resulted in an extreme housing shortage. For example, from 2012 to 2017, the San Francisco metropolitan area added 400,000 new jobs, but only 60,000 new housing units. As of 2016, the entire Bay Area had 3.6 M jobs, and 2.6 M housing units, for a ratio of 1.4 jobs per housing unit, significantly above the ratio for the US as a whole, which stands at 1.1 jobs per housing unit. (152M jobs, 136M housing units)

As of 2017, the average income needed in order to purchase a house in the region was $179,390, while the median price for a house was $895,000 and the average cost of a home in the Bay Area was $440,000, more than twice the national average. Additionally, the average monthly rent was $1,240, 50 percent more than the national average. In 2018, a Bay Area household income of $117,000 was classified as "low income" by the Department of Housing and Urban Development.

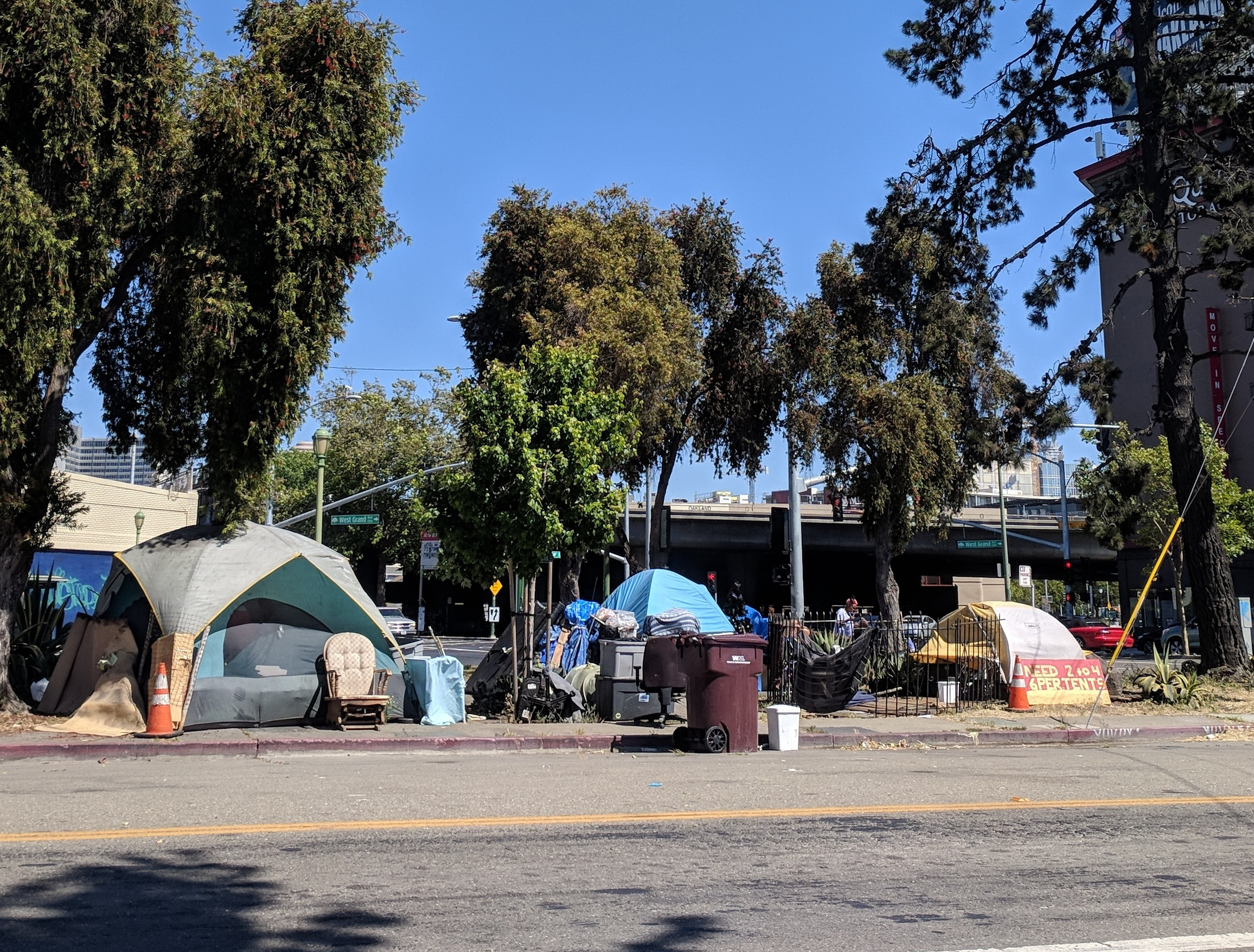
Homeless encampment in Oakland

Many Bay Area residents allocate large amounts of their income towards housing: 20 percent of Bay Area homeowners spend more than half their income on housing, while roughly 25 percent of renters in the Bay Area spend more than half of their incomes on rent. Expending an average of more than $28,000 per year on housing in addition to roughly $13,400 on transportation, Bay Area residents spend around $41,420 per year, or 59 percent of the Bay Area's median household income, to live in the region.

The high rate of homelessness in the Bay Area can be attributed to the high cost of living. No approximate number of homeless people living in the Bay Area can be determined due to the difficulty of tracking homeless residents. However, according to San Francisco's Department of Public Health, the number of homeless people in San Francisco alone is 9,975. Additionally, San Francisco was revealed to have the most unsheltered homeless people in the country.

Because of the high cost of housing, many workers in the Bay Area live far from their place of employment, contributing to one of the highest percentages of extreme commuters in the United States, or commutes that take over ninety minutes in one direction. For example, about 50,000 people commute from neighboring San Joaquin County into the nine-county Bay Area daily, and more extremely, some workers commute semimonthly by flying.

== Education ==
=== Colleges and universities ===
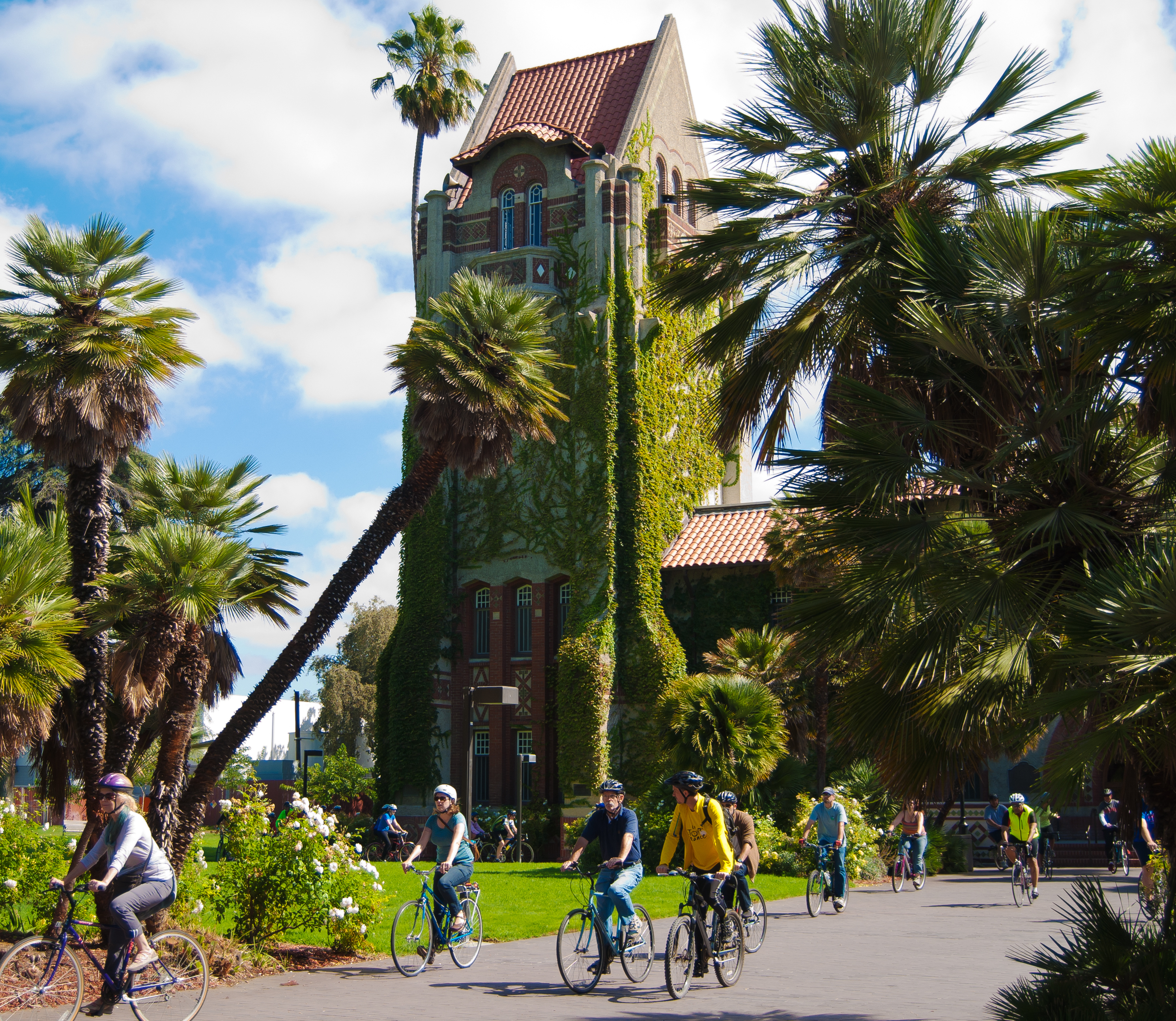
San José State University is the oldest public university on the West Coast and the founding campus of the California State University.

The Bay Area is home to a large number of colleges and universities. The first institution of higher education in the Bay Area, Santa Clara University, was founded by Jesuits in 1851, who also founded the University of San Francisco in 1855. San Jose State University was founded in 1857 and is the oldest public college on the West Coast of the United States. According to the Brookings Institution, 45% of residents of the two-county San Jose metro area have a college degree, and 43% of residents in the five-county San Francisco metro area have a college degree, the second and fourth-highest ranked metro areas in the country for higher educational attainment.

As of 2025, Stanford University is the highest-ranked national university in the Bay Area by U.S. News & World Report, and was ranked fourth among national private universities. The University of California, Berkeley was ranked first among national public universities and sixth globally by U.S. News and World Report in 2025. Stanford University and the University of California, Berkeley, strengthened by their co-location in the Bay Area, form one of three pairs of "super-brands" of universities alongside Harvard and MIT in Boston and Oxford and Cambridge in the United Kingdom. Additionally, San Jose State University and Saint Mary's College were ranked 4th and 7th, respectively, among regional universities in the West by U.S. News & World Report in 2025, with the Cal Poly Maritime Academy ranking 2nd among regional colleges in the West in 2025.

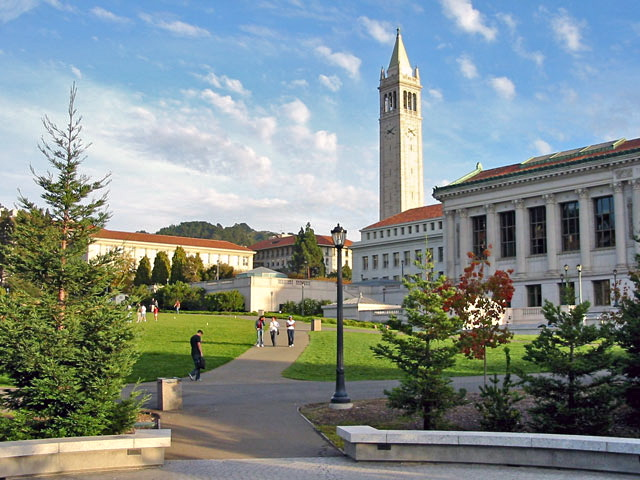
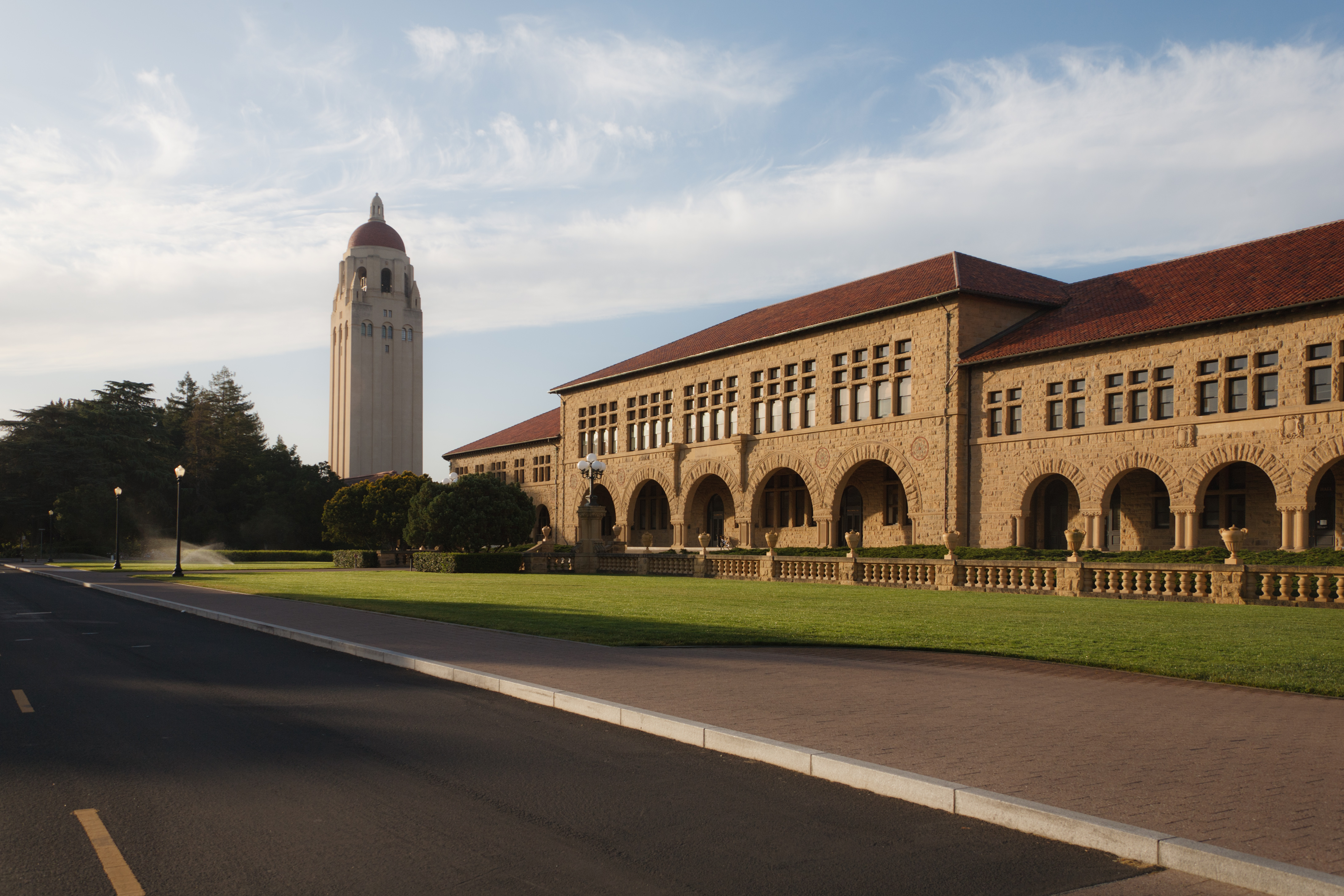
University of California, Berkeley (top) and Stanford University (bottom) are two of the highest ranked universities in the world.

The city of San Francisco is host to two additional University of California schools, neither of which confer undergraduate degrees. The University of California, San Francisco, is entirely dedicated to graduate education in health and biomedical sciences. It is ranked among the top five medical schools in the United States and operates the UCSF Medical Center, which is the highest-ranked hospital in California. The University of California, College of the Law, founded in Civic Center in 1878, is the oldest law school in California and more judges on the state bench are its graduates than any other institution. The city is also host to a California State University school, San Francisco State University. Additional campuses of the California State University system in the Bay Area are Cal State East Bay in Hayward and Cal Maritime in Vallejo.

California Community Colleges System also operates a number of community colleges in the Bay Area. According to CNNMoney, the Bay Area community college with the highest "success" rate is De Anza College in Cupertino, which is also the tenth-highest ranked in the nation. Other well-ranked Bay Area community colleges include Foothill College, City College of San Francisco, West Valley College, Diablo Valley College, and Las Positas College.

Many scholars have pointed out the overlap of education and the economy within the Bay Area. According to multiple reports, research universities such as Stanford; University of California, Santa Cruz; and University of California, Berkeley, are essential to the culture and economy in the area. These universities also provide public programs that teach and enhance skills relevant to the local economies. These opportunities not only provide educational services to the community, but also generate significant amounts of revenue.

=== Primary and secondary schools ===
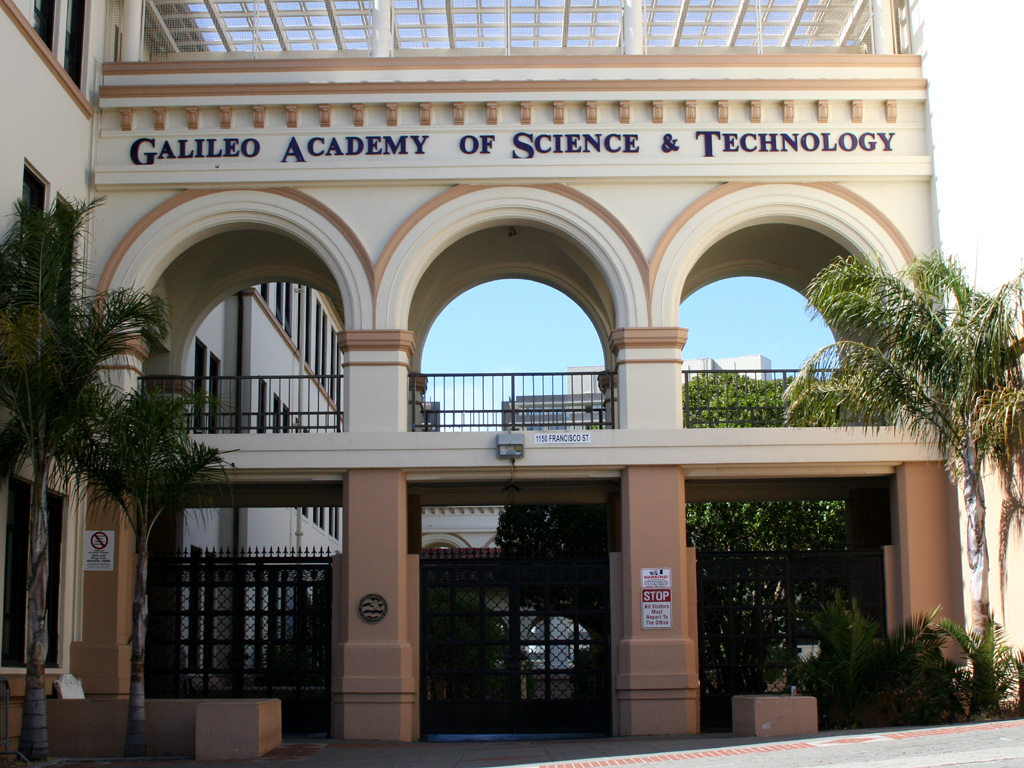
The Galileo Academy of Science & Technology, an SFUSD public school

Public primary and secondary education in the Bay Area is provided through school districts organized through three structures (elementary school districts, high school districts, or unified school districts) and are governed by an elected board. In addition, many Bay Area counties and the city of San Francisco operate "special service schools" that are geared towards providing education to students with handicaps or special needs.

An alternative public educational setting is offered by charter schools, which may be established with a renewable charter of up to five years by third parties. The mechanism for charter schools in the Bay Area is governed by the California Charter Schools Act of 1992.

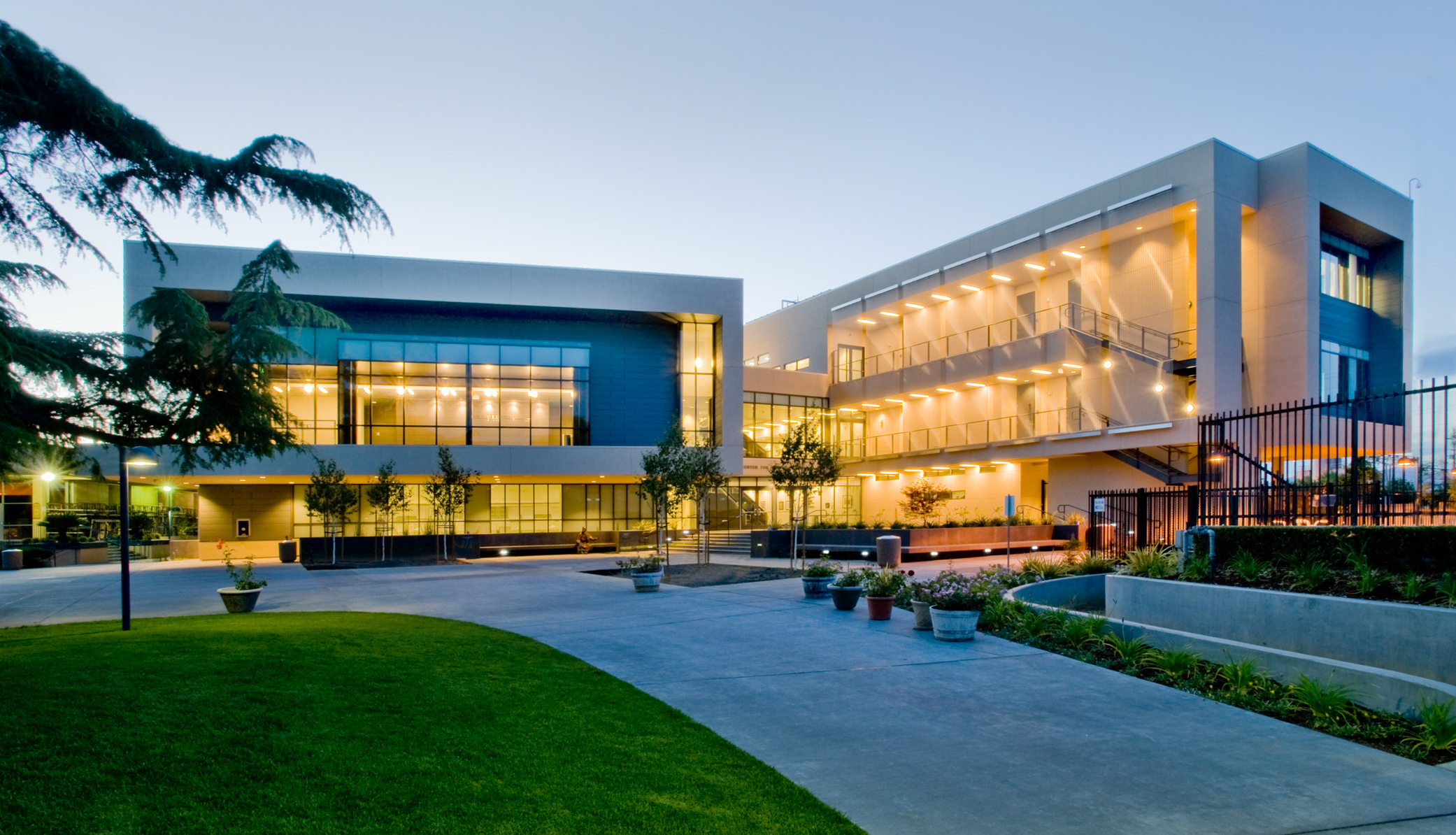
San Jose's Bellarmine College Preparatory is one of the oldest schools in California.

According to rankings compiled by U.S. News & World Report, the highest-ranked high school in California is the Pacific Collegiate School, located in Santa Cruz. Within the traditional nine-county boundaries, the highest ranked high school is KIPP San Jose Collegiate in San Jose. Among the top twenty high schools in California include Lowell, Monta Vista, Lynbrook, University Preparatory Academy, Mission San Jose, Oakland Charter, Henry M. Gunn, Gilroy Early College Academy, and Saratoga.

== Transportation ==
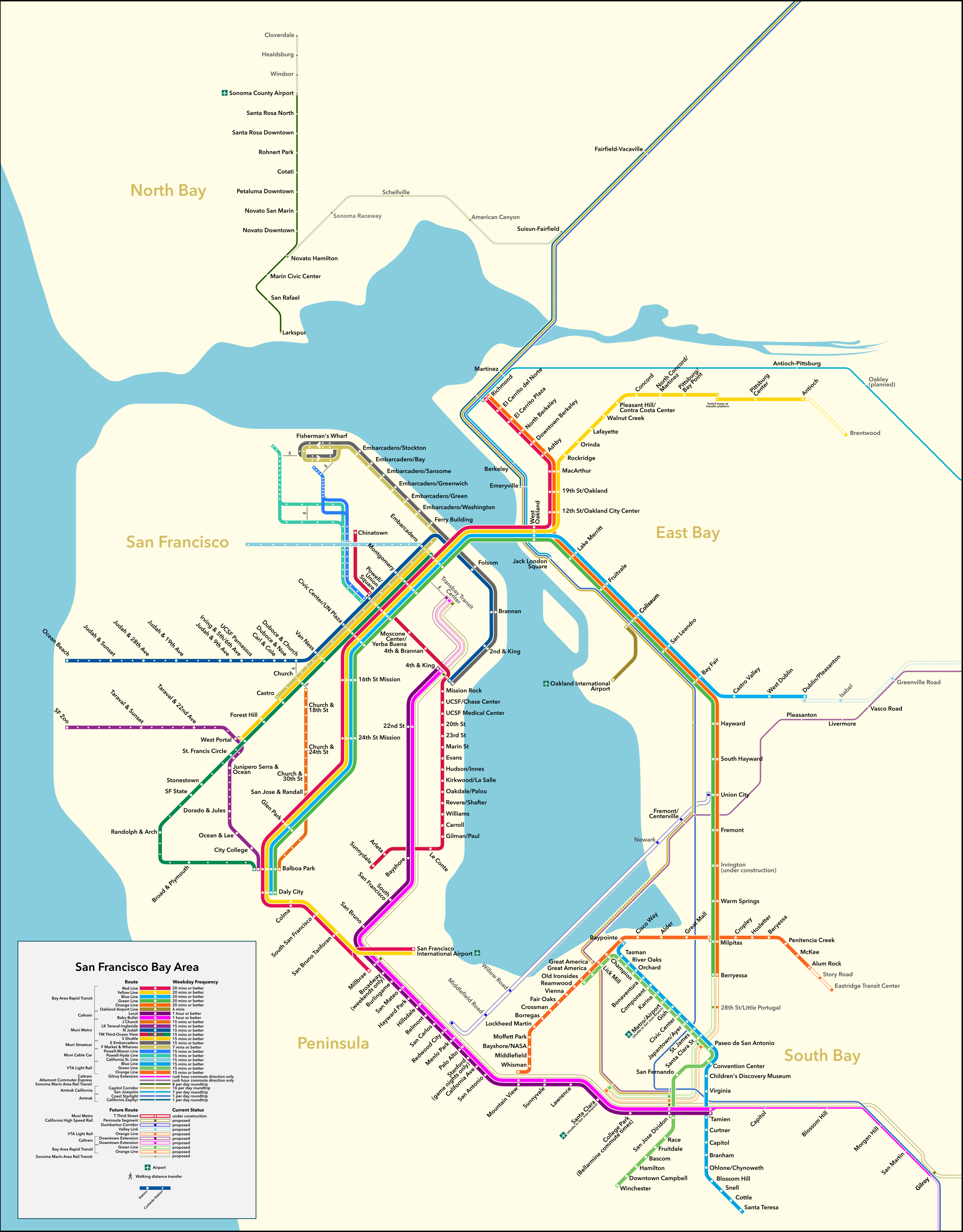
The Bay Area is served by a variety of rail transit systems, including ACE, Amtrak, BART, Caltrain, Muni Metro, SMART, and VTA.

Transportation in the San Francisco Bay Area is reliant on a complex multimodal infrastructure consisting of roads, bridges, highways, rail, tunnels, airports, ferries, and bike and pedestrian paths. The development, maintenance, and operation of these different modes of transportation are overseen by various agencies, including the California Department of Transportation (Caltrans), San Francisco Municipal Transportation Agency, and the Metropolitan Transportation Commission. These and other organizations collectively manage several interstate highways and state routes, two subway networks, three commuter rail agencies, eight trans-bay bridges, transbay ferry service, local bus service, three international airports (San Francisco, San Jose, and Oakland), as well as a network of roads, tunnels, and paths, including the San Francisco Bay Trail.

The Bay Area hosts an extensive freeway and highway system that is particularly prone to traffic congestion, with one study by Inrix concluding that the Bay Area's traffic was the fourth worst in the world. There are some city streets in San Francisco where gaps occur in the freeway system, partly the result of the Freeway Revolt, and additional damage that occurred in the wake of the 1989 Loma Prieta earthquake resulted in freeway segments being removed instead of reinforced or rebuilt. The greater Bay Area contains the three principal north–south highways in California: Interstate 5, U.S. Route 101, and California State Route 1. U.S. 101 and State Route 1 directly serve the traditional nine-county region, while Interstate 5 bypasses to the east in San Joaquin County to provide a more direct Los Angeles–Sacramento route. Additional local highways connect the various subregions of the Bay Area together.

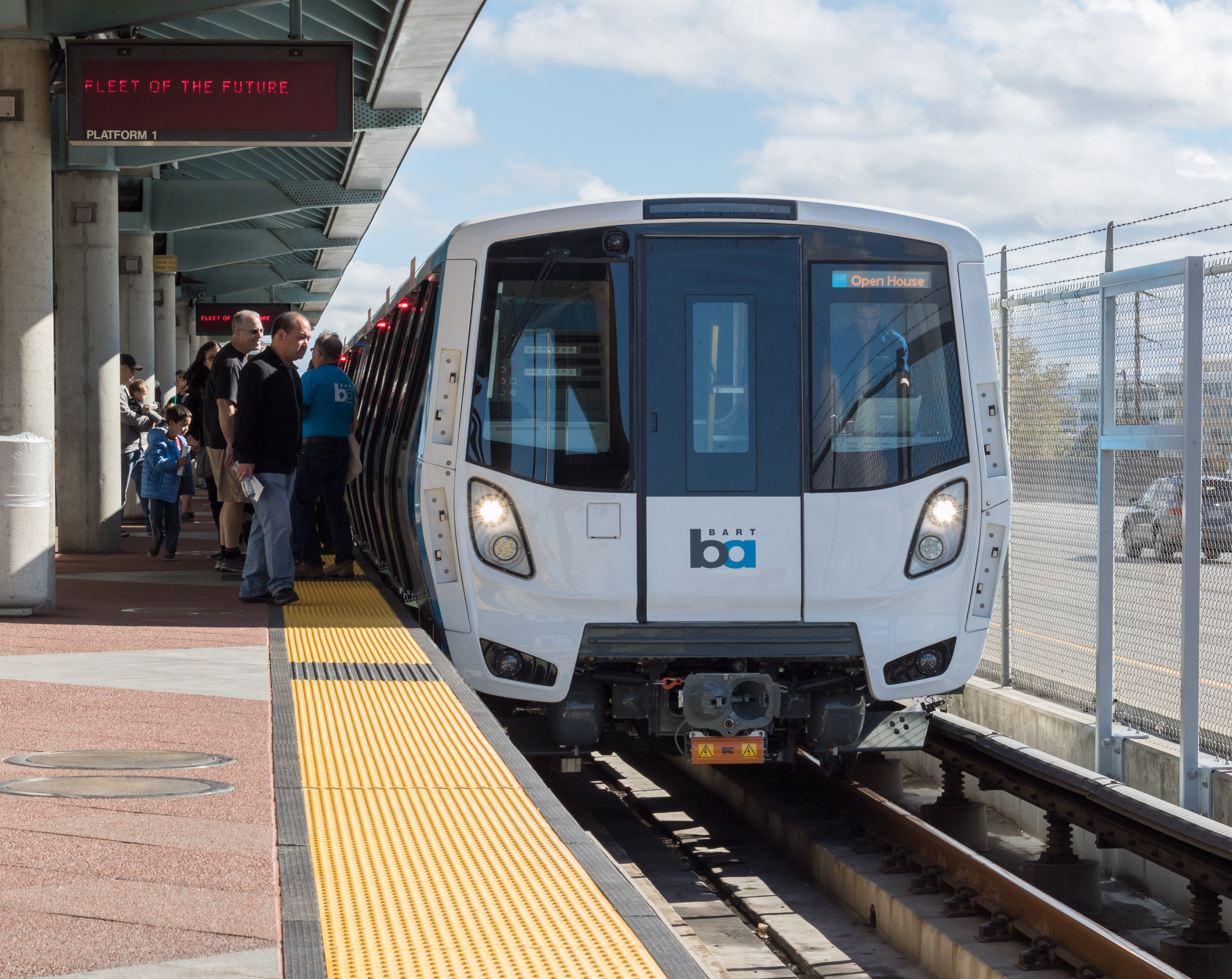
Bay Area Rapid Transit (BART) serves 50 stations across the region, excluding the North Bay counties.

There are over two dozen public transit agencies in the Bay Area with overlapping service areas that utilize different modes, with designated connection points between the various operators. Bay Area Rapid Transit (BART), a heavy rail/metro similar to European S-Bahn systems, operates in five counties and connects San Francisco and Oakland via the Transbay Tube. Other commuter rail systems link San Francisco with the Peninsula and San Jose (Caltrain), San Jose with the Tri-Valley Area and San Joaquin County (ACE), and Sonoma with Marin County (SMART).

In addition, Amtrak provides frequent commuter service between San Jose and the East Bay with Sacramento, and long-distance service to other parts of the United States. Muni Metro operates a hybrid streetcar/subway system within the city of San Francisco, and VTA operates a light rail system in Santa Clara County. These rail systems are supplemented by numerous bus agencies and transbay ferries such as Golden Gate Ferry and the San Francisco Bay Ferry. Most of these agencies accept the Clipper Card, a reloadable contactless smart card, as a universal electronic payment system.

== Government and politics ==
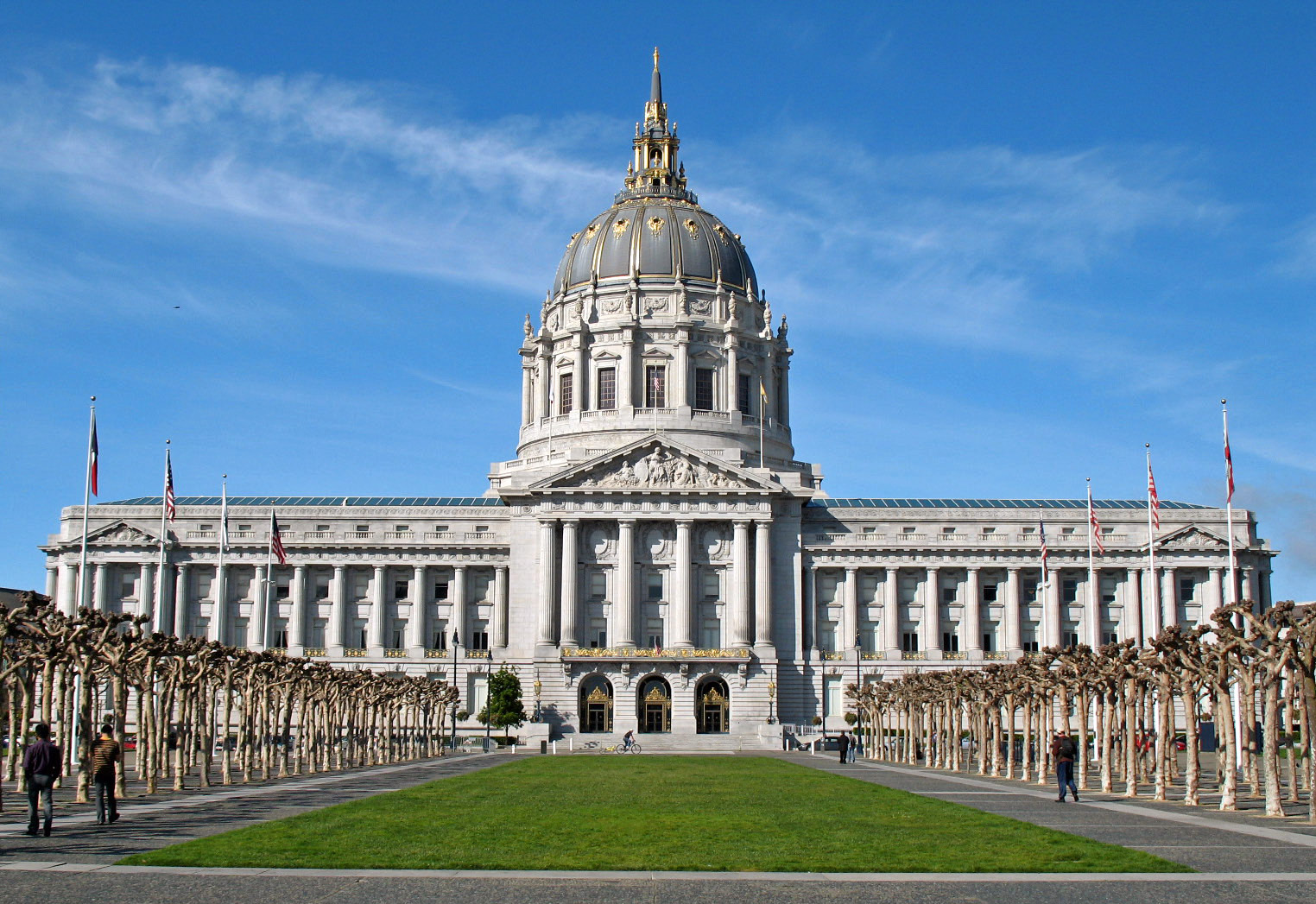
The Government of San Francisco is based at San Francisco City Hall.

Government in the San Francisco Bay Area consists of multiple actors, including 101 city and nine county governments, a dozen regional agencies, and a large number of single-purpose special districts such as municipal utility districts and transit districts. Incorporated cities are responsible for providing police service, zoning, issuing building permits, and maintaining public streets among other duties. County governments are responsible for elections and voter registration, vital records, property assessment and records, tax collection, public health, agricultural regulations, and building inspections, among other duties. Public education is provided by independent school districts and are managed by an elected school board. A variety of special districts also exist and provide a single purpose, such as delivering public transit in the case of the Bay Area Rapid Transit District, or monitoring air quality levels in the case of the Bay Area Air Quality Management District.

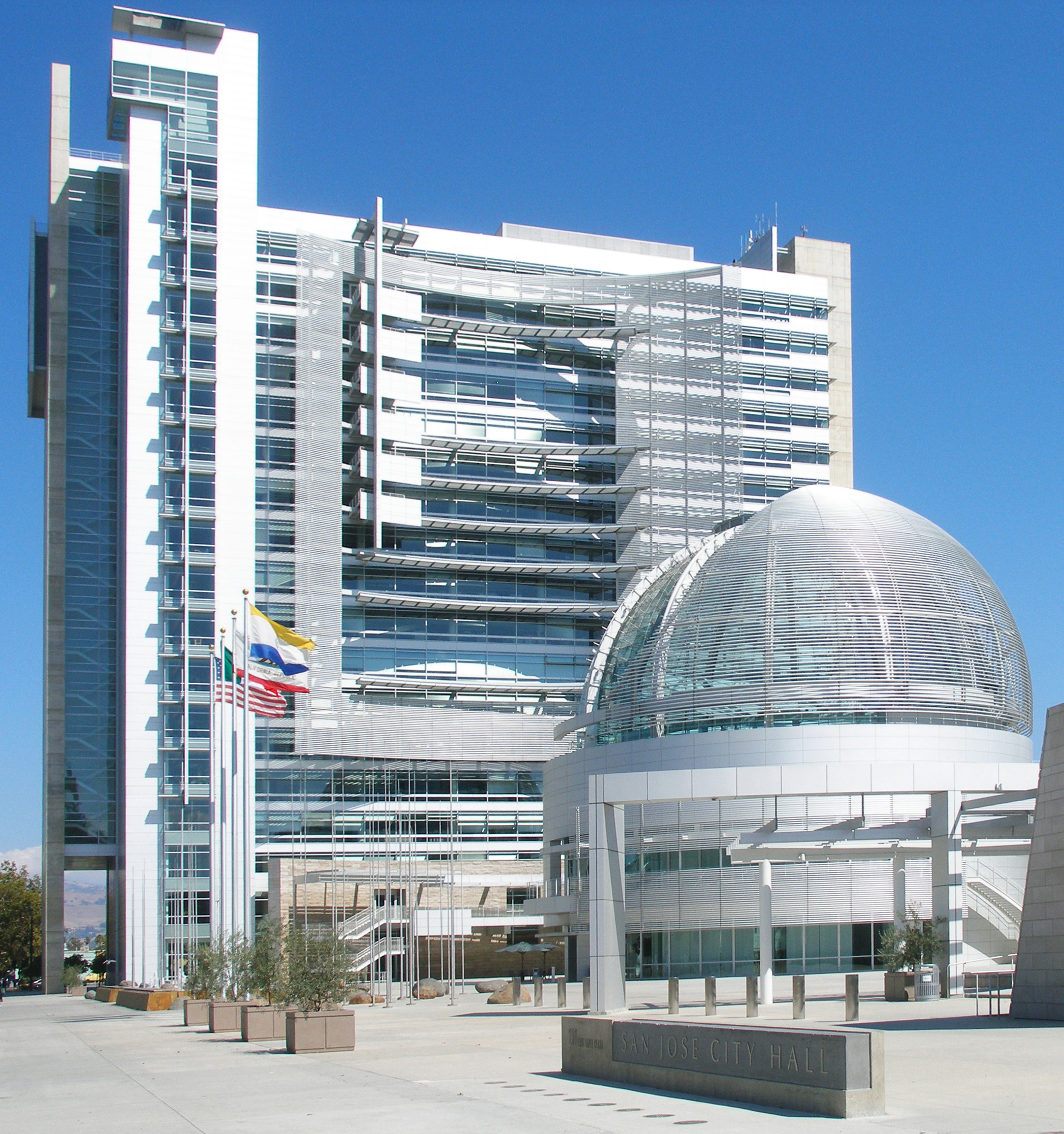
The Government of San Jose is based at San Jose City Hall.

Politics in the Bay Area is widely regarded as one of the most liberal in California and in the United States. Since the late 1960s, the Bay Area has cemented its role as the most liberal region in California politics, giving greater support for the Democratic Party's candidates than any other region of the state, even as California trended towards the Democratic Party over time. According to research by the Public Policy Institute of California, the Bay Area and the North Coast counties of Humboldt and Mendocino were the most consistently and strongly liberal areas in California.

According to the California Secretary of State, the Democratic Party holds a voter registration advantage in every congressional district, State Senate district, State Assembly district, State Board of Equalization district, all nine counties, and all of the 101 incorporated municipalities in the Bay Area. On the other hand, the center-right Republican Party holds a voter registration advantage in only one State Assembly sub-district (the portion of the 4th in Solano County). According to the Cook Partisan Voting Index (CPVI), the Bay Area's districts tend to favor Democratic candidates by roughly 40 to 50 percentage points, considerably above the mean for California and the nation overall.

Bay Area counties by population and voter registration
County	Population	Registered voters	Democratic	Republican	D–R spread	American Independent	Green	Libertarian	Peace and Freedom	Americans Elect	Other	No party preference
Alameda	1,494,876	87.97%	60.03%	10.93%	+49.1%	2.16%	0.56%	0.64%	0.4%	0.0%	0.60%	24.67%
Contra Costa	1,037,817	93.24%	53.26%	18.51%	+34.75%	3.2%	0.4%	0.86%	0.39%	0.0%	0.4%	22.6%
Marin	250,666	97.66%	61.42%	12.63%	+48.79%	2.66%	0.6%	0.78%	0.2%	0.0%	0.48%	20.95%
Napa	135,377	94.51%	50.02%	21.39%	+28.63%	3.59%	0.57%	1.15%	0.38%	0.0%	0.68%	21.78%
San Francisco	870,887	78.56%	62.67%	6.74%	+55.94	1.71%	0.54%	0.58%	0.34%	0.0%	0.3%	25.92%
San Mateo	711,622	88.59%	55.54%	14.12%	+41.42%	2.43%	0.39%	0.72%	0.31%	0.0%	0.58%	25.34%
Santa Clara	1,762,754	85.68%	50.44%	16.64%	+33.81%	2.41%	0.36%	0.81%	0.39%	0.0%	0.29%	28.63%
Solano	411,620	89.5%	48.59%	22.09%	+26.5%	3.56%	0.39%	1.04%	0.5%	0.0%	0.62%	22.88%
Sonoma	478,551	91.4%	56.56%	17.57%	+38.99%	3.08%	0.73%	1.11%	0.35%	0.0%	0.52%	19.4%

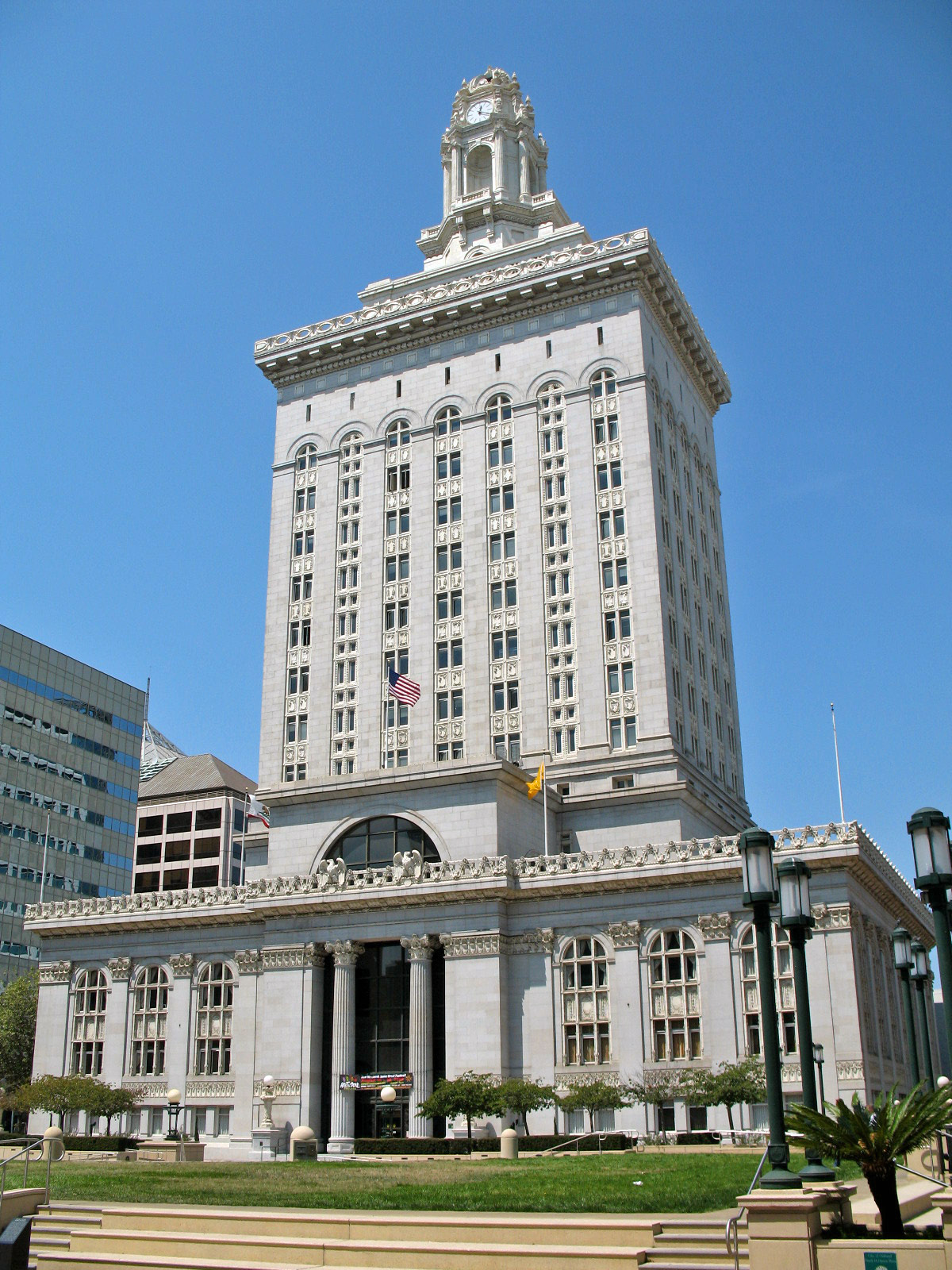
Oakland City Hall

In U.S. Presidential elections since 1960, the nine-county Bay Area voted for Republican candidates only two times, in both cases voting for a candidate from California: Richard Nixon in 1972 and Ronald Reagan in 1980. The last county to vote for a Republican presidential candidate was Napa county, who voted for George H. W. Bush in 1988. Since then, all nine Bay Area counties have voted consistently for the Democratic candidate, and currently, both of California's Senators are Democrats, as are all twelve congressional districts wholly or partially in the Bay Area. Additionally, every Bay Area member of the California State Senate and the California State Assembly is a registered Democrat.

The Bay Area's association with progressive politics has led to the term "San Francisco values" being used pejoratively by conservative commentators to describe the secular progressive culture in the area.

=== Regional governance ===
The Metropolitan Transportation Commission (MTC), formed in 1970 by the California Legislature, is the region's metropolitan planning organization, while the Association of Bay Area Governments (ABAG) serves as the regional planning agency and council of local governments. The ABAG and MTC functionally merged by consolidating their staff into a single team, effective July 1, 2017, although they maintain separate governing boards. ABAG and MTC developed Plan Bay Area, the area's regional transportation plan, in 2013 with a goal date of 2040.

Other regional governance agencies include the Bay Area Air Quality Management District, Bay Area Toll Authority, San Francisco Bay Restoration Authority, and the Bay Conservation & Development Commission.

== Culture ==
=== Arts ===
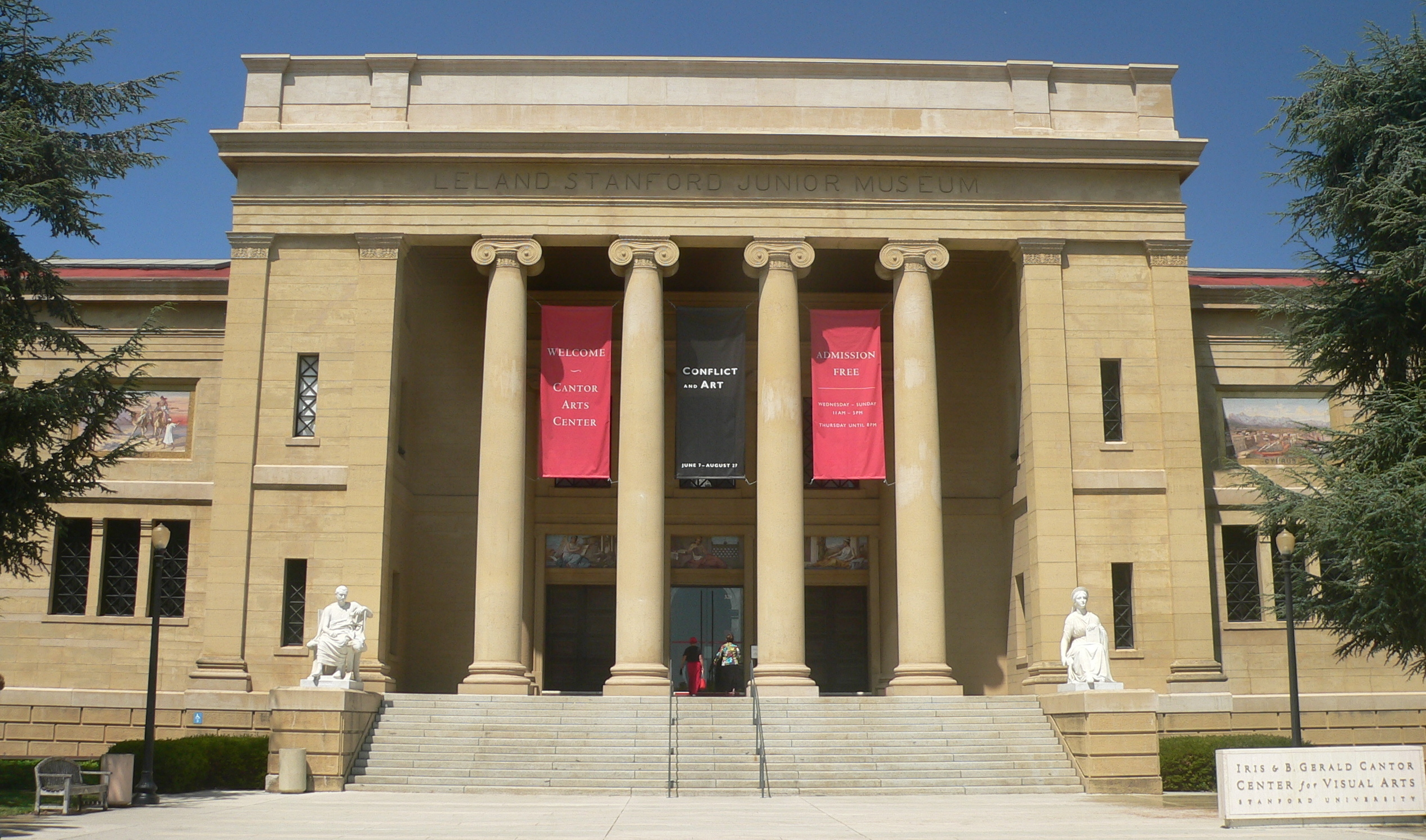
Cantor Arts Center in Stanford

The Bay Area was a hub of painting's Abstract Expressionism movement. It is associated with the works of Clyfford Still, who began teaching at the California School of Fine Arts (now the San Francisco Art Institute) in 1946. In 1950, Abstract Expressionist David Park painted Kids on Bikes, which retained many abstract expressionism aspects but with original distinguishing features that would later lead to the Bay Area Figurative Movement.

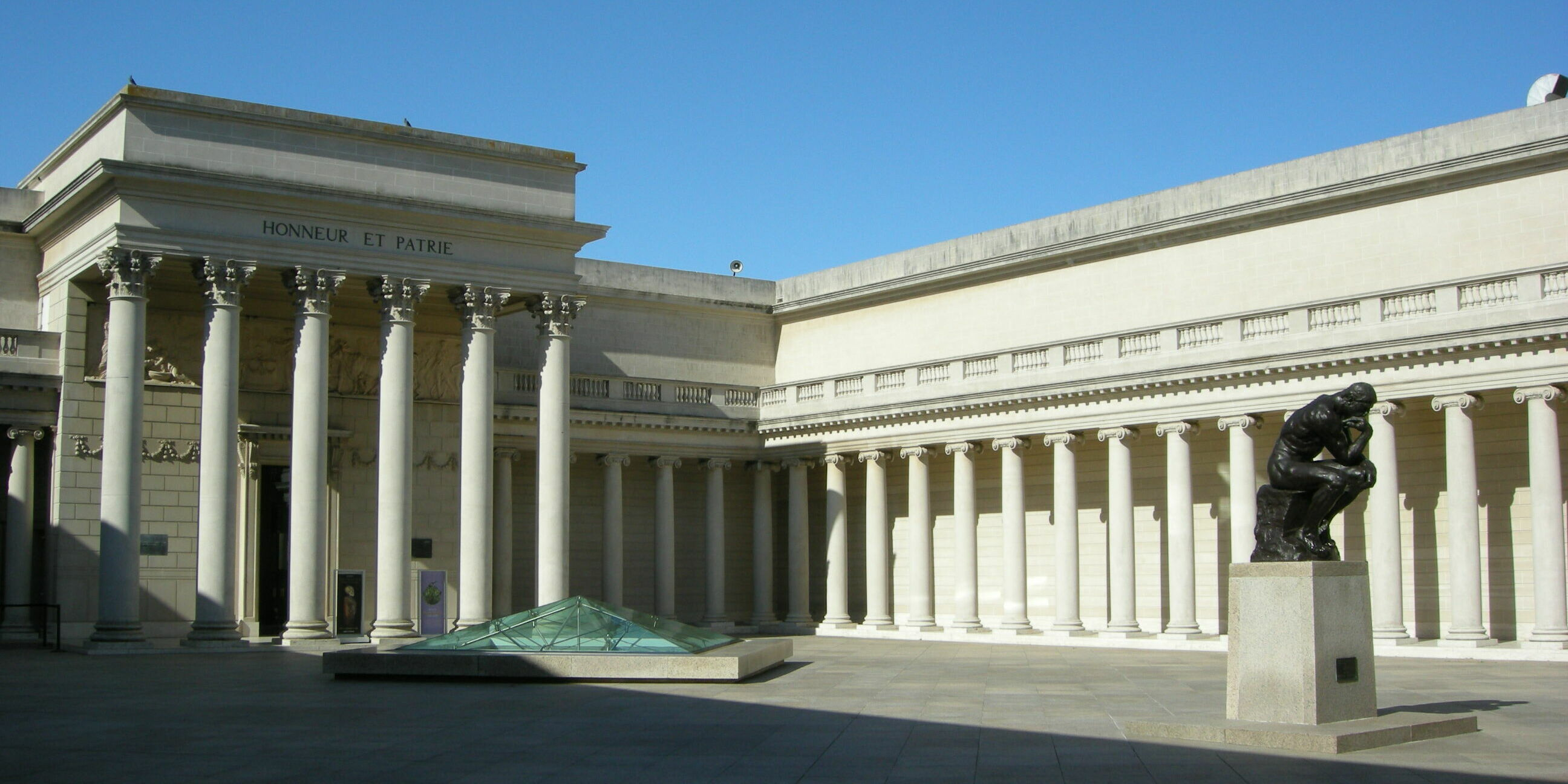
The California Palace of the Legion of Honor of Fine Arts Museums SF

While both the Figurative and Abstract Expressionism movements arose from art schools, Funk art rose out of the region's underground and was characterized by an informal sharing of technique in "cooperative" galleries instead of formal museums. The Bay Area art movement would also be heavily influenced by the counterculture movement.

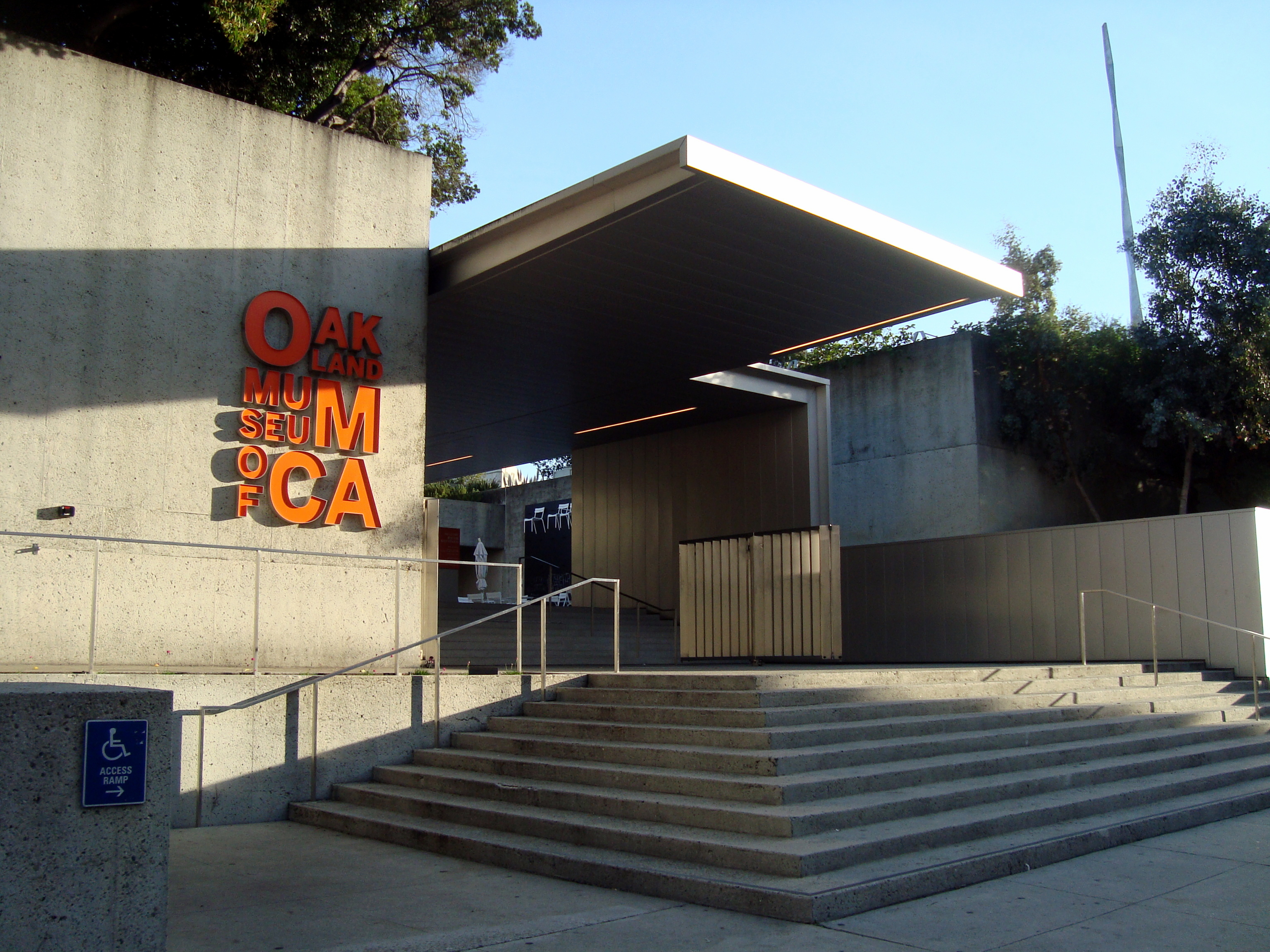
Oakland Museum of California

The San Francisco Renaissance was an era of poetic activity centered in San Francisco and on poets such as Gary Snyder, Allen Ginsberg, Lawrence Ferlinghetti in the 1950s. The movement, which often included visual and performing arts, was heavily influenced by cross-cultural interests, particularly Buddhism, Taoism, and general East Asian cultures.

The Bay Area hosts an active computer animation industry led by Pixar Animation Studios and Industrial Light & Magic.

=== Music ===
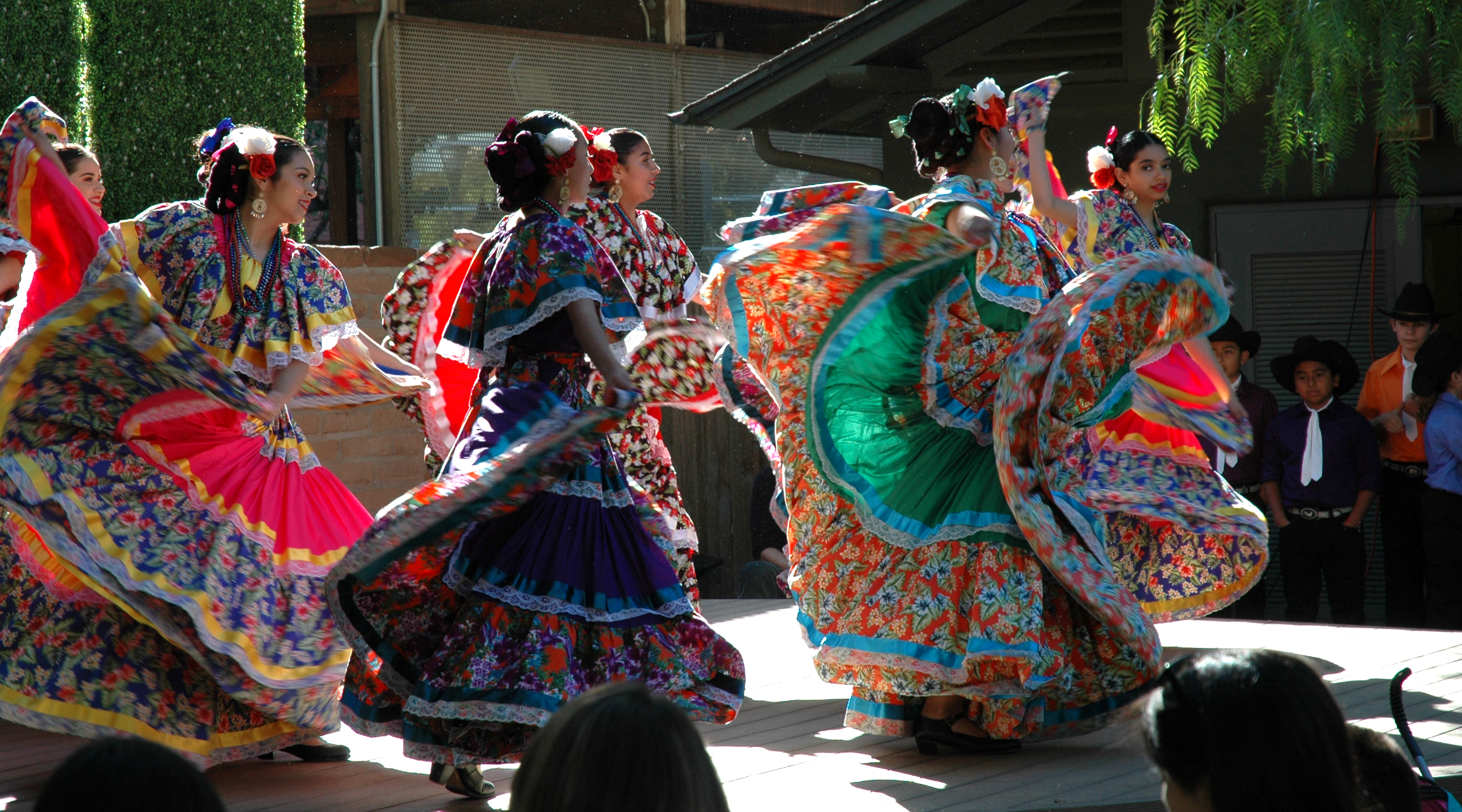
Baile folklórico at the 240th anniversary of the founding of San Jose at the Gonzales-Peralta Adobe

The Bay Area has been home to several musical movements that left lasting influences on the genres they affected. San Francisco in particular was the center of the counterculture movement that led to the rise of The Grateful Dead, Jefferson Airplane, and Janis Joplin, all three of which are closely associated with the 1967 Summer of Love. Jimi Hendrix also had strong connections to the Bay Area, as he lived in Berkeley briefly as a child and played in many local venues in the 1960s. By the 1970s, San Francisco had developed a vibrant jazz scene, earning the moniker, "Harlem of the West". At the same time, Bay Area bands such as Creedence Clearwater Revival became known for their political and socially-conscious lyrics, particularly against the Vietnam War. Carlos Santana also rose to fame in the early 1970s with his Santana band. Two former members of Santana, Neal Schon and Gregg Rolie later led the band Journey.

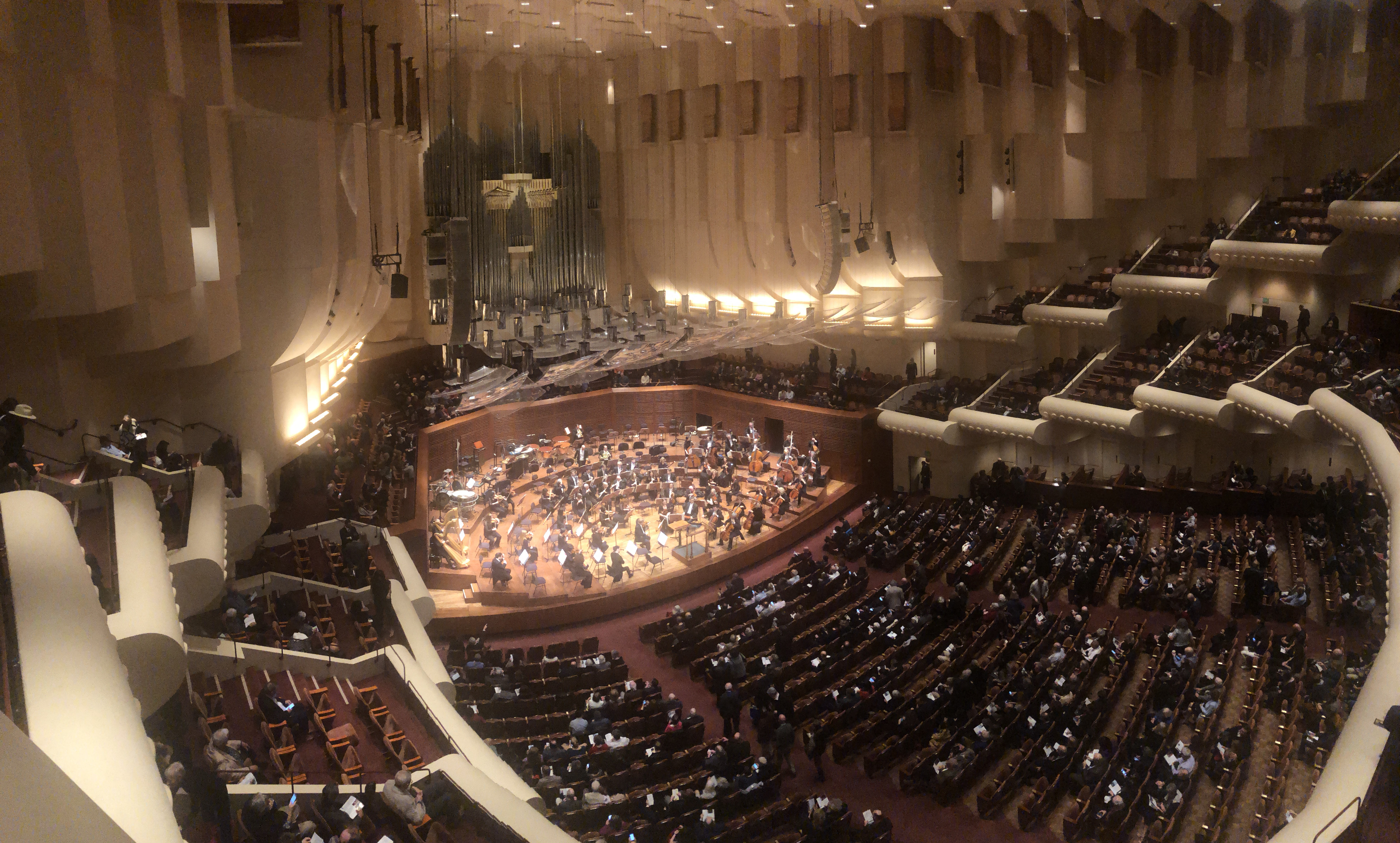
The San Francisco Symphony at the Davies Symphony Hall

During the 1980s and early 1990s, the Bay Area became home to heavy metal and hard rock bands and also to one of the largest and most influential thrash metal scenes, with contributions from Exodus, Testament, Death Angel, Forbidden, Vio-lence, Lȧȧz Rockit, Possessed and Blind Illusion. Additionally, three of the "Big Four" thrash metal bands, Metallica, Slayer and Megadeth, while from Los Angeles, contributed to Bay Area thrash metal by frequently playing shows in the area, especially early in their careers.

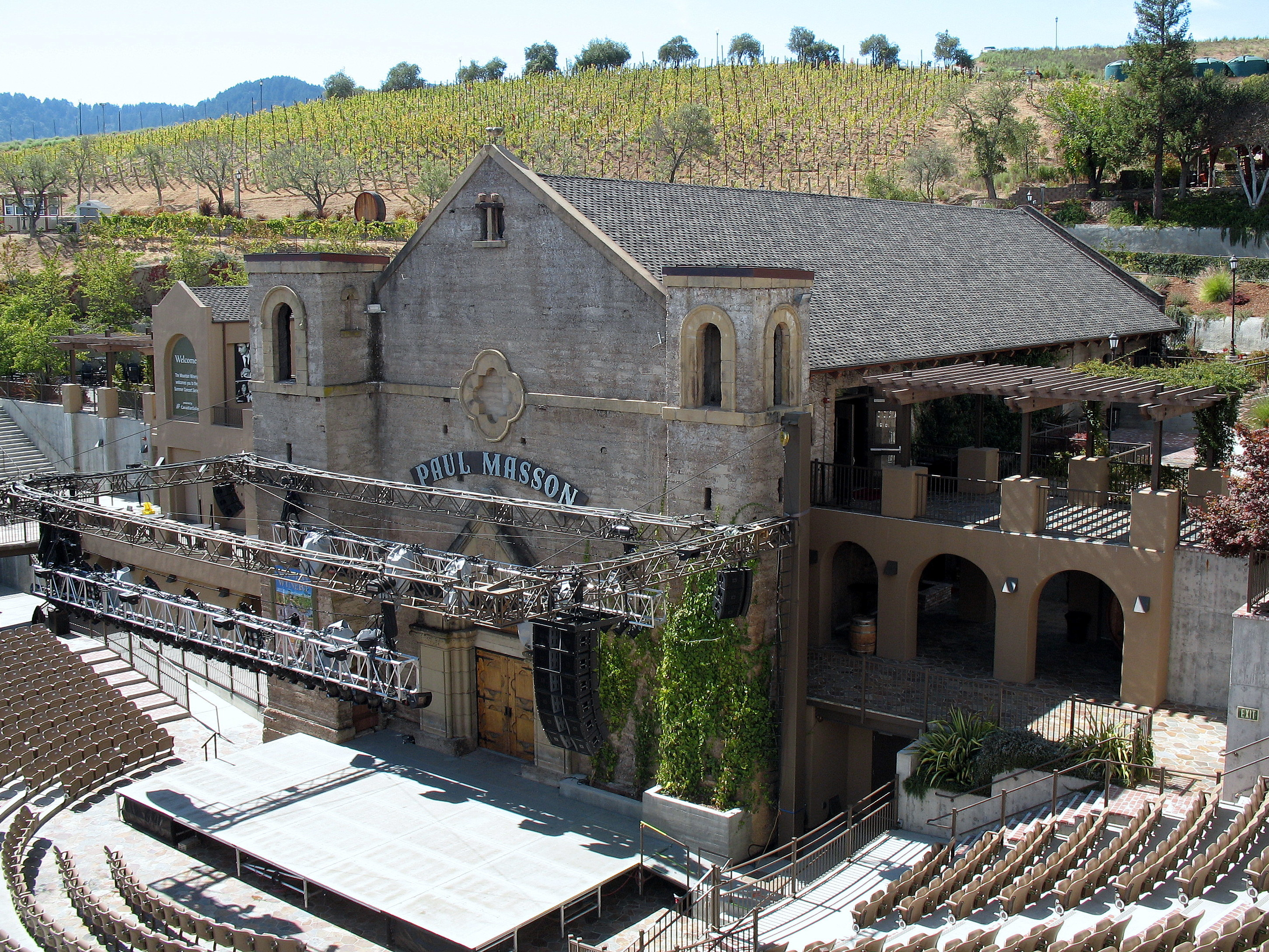
Mountain Winery is a concert venue and vineyard in Saratoga.

The post-grunge era in the 1990s featured prominent Bay Area bands Third Eye Blind, Counting Crows, and Smash Mouth, and pop punk rock bands such as Green Day. The 1990s also saw the emergence of the hyphy movement in hip hop, derived from the Oakland slang for "hyperactive", and pioneered by Bay Area rappers Andre "Mac Dre" Hicks, Mistah Fab, and E-40. Other notable rappers from the Bay Area include Lil B, Tupac Shakur, MC Hammer, Too $hort, and G-Eazy. Today, much of Oakland and East Bay rap is "conscious rap", which concerns itself with social issues and awareness.

The Bay Area is also home to hundreds of classical music ensembles, from community choirs to professional orchestras, such as the San Francisco Symphony, California Symphony, Fremont Symphony Orchestra, Oakland Symphony and the San Francisco Chamber Orchestra.

Many notable musicians and bands have Bay Area roots, including: Green Day (Rodeo), Grateful Dead (Palo Alto), and H.E.R. (Vallejo).

=== Theater ===
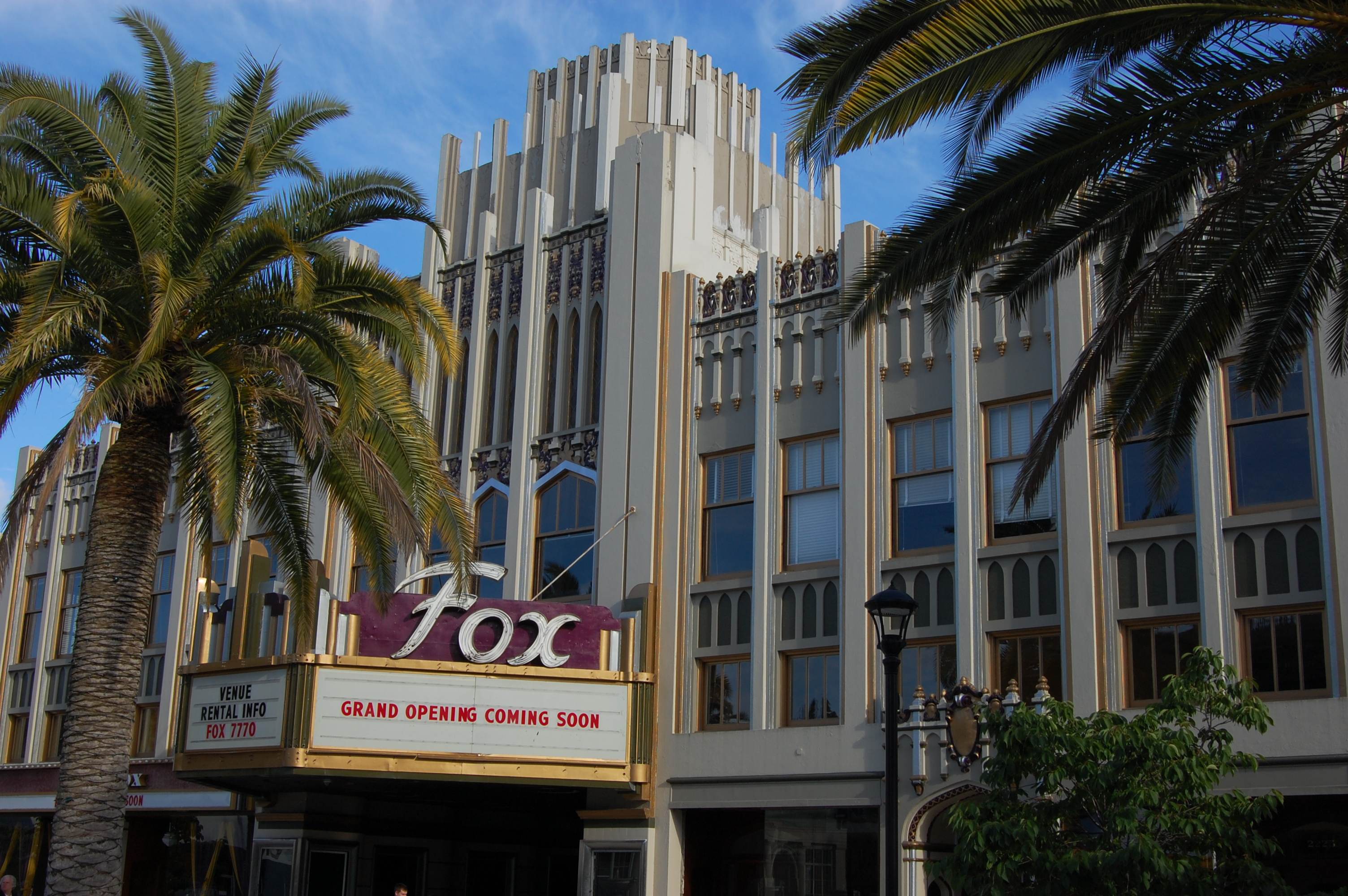
Fox Theatre in Redwood City

The Bay Area is the third largest center of activity for theater companies and actors in the United States, after the New York City and Chicago metropolitan areas, with 400 companies in the region. Theatre Bay Area was founded in 1976 by the Magic Theatre and American Conservatory Theater (ACT) in San Francisco and the Berkeley Repertory Theatre in Berkeley. The latter two, along with the San Francisco Mime Troupe and Palo Alto-based Theatreworks, have each won one Regional Theatre Tony Award.

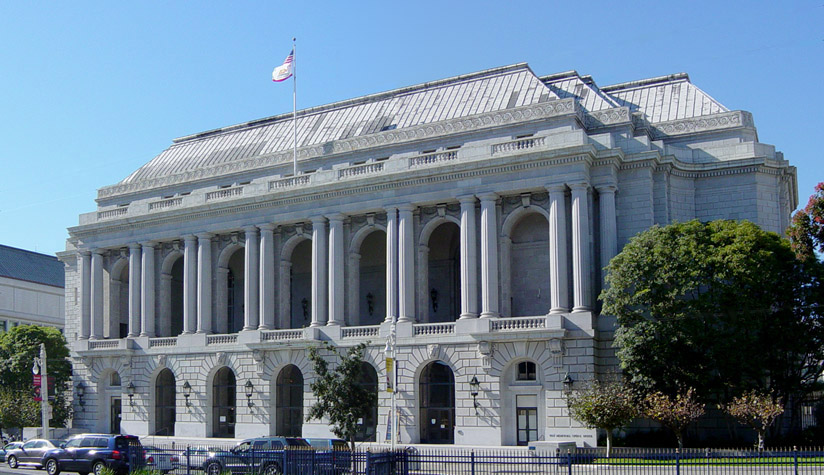
War Memorial Opera House is the home of the San Francisco Opera and the San Francisco Ballet.

Several famous actors have emerged from the Bay Area's theatre community, including Daveed Diggs and Darren Criss. Other local actors include James Carpenter, a stage actor who has performed at the ACT, Berkeley Repertory, and San Jose Repertory Theatre among others, and Rod Gnapp of the Magic Theatre Company, Sean San Jose, Campo Santo member Margo Hall, and one of the founders of the Campo Santo theater.

The Bay Area also has an active youth theater scene. ACT and the Berkeley Repertory both run classes and camps for young actors, as do the Peninsula Youth Theater, Willow Glen Children's Theatre, Bay Area Children's Theater, Danville Children's Musical Theater, Marin Shakespeare, and many others.

== Media ==
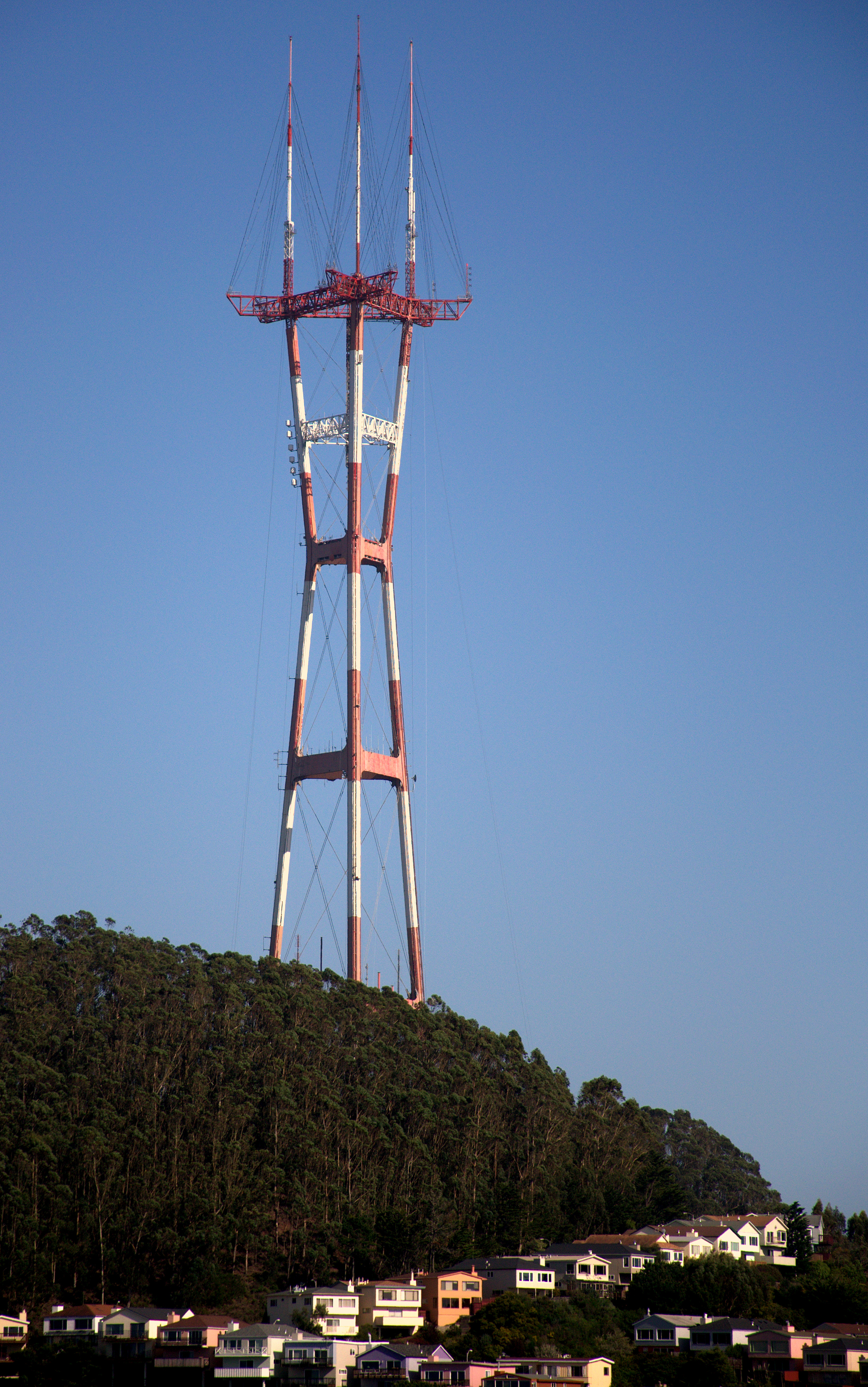
Sutro Tower is a broadcast tower and local landmark.

The San Francisco Bay Area is the tenth-largest television market and the fourth-largest radio market in the U.S. The Bay Area's oldest radio station, KCBS (AM), began as an experimental station in San Jose in 1909, before the beginning of commercial broadcasting. KALW was the Bay Area's first FM radio station, and first radio station to begin commercial broadcasting west of the Mississippi River when it signed on the air in 1941. KPIX, which began broadcasting in 1948, was the first television station to air in the Bay Area and Northern California.

All major U.S. television networks have affiliates serving the region, including KTVU 2 (FOX), KRON-TV 4 (The CW), KPIX 5 (CBS), KGO-TV 7 (ABC), KQED-TV 9 (PBS), KNTV 11 (NBC), KICU-TV 36 (MyNetworkTV), KPYX 44 (Independent), KQEH 54 (PBS), and KKPX 65 (Ion). Bloomberg West, a show that focuses on topics pertaining to technology and business, was launched in 2011 and continues to broadcast from San Francisco.

Public broadcasting outlets include both a television and a radio station, both broadcasting from near the Potrero Hill neighborhood under the call letters KQED. KQED-FM is the most-listened-to National Public Radio affiliate in the country. Another local broadcaster, KPOO, is an independent, African-American owned and operated noncommercial radio station established in 1971.

The largest newspapers in the Bay Area and the most widely circulated in Northern California are the San Francisco Chronicle and San Jose Mercury News. The Chronicle is best known for the late Herb Caen, whose daily musings attracted critical acclaim and represented the "voice of San Francisco". The San Francisco Examiner, once the cornerstone of William Randolph Hearst's media empire and the home of Ambrose Bierce, declined in circulation over the years and now takes the form of a free daily tabloid. Most of the Bay Area's local regions and municipalities also have their own newspapers, such as the East Bay Times and San Mateo Daily Journal. The national newsmagazine Mother Jones is also based in San Francisco, and non-English-language newspapers include El Mundo, a free Spanish-language weekly distributed by Mercury News, and several Chinese-language papers, the largest of which is Sing Tao Daily.

== Sports and recreation ==
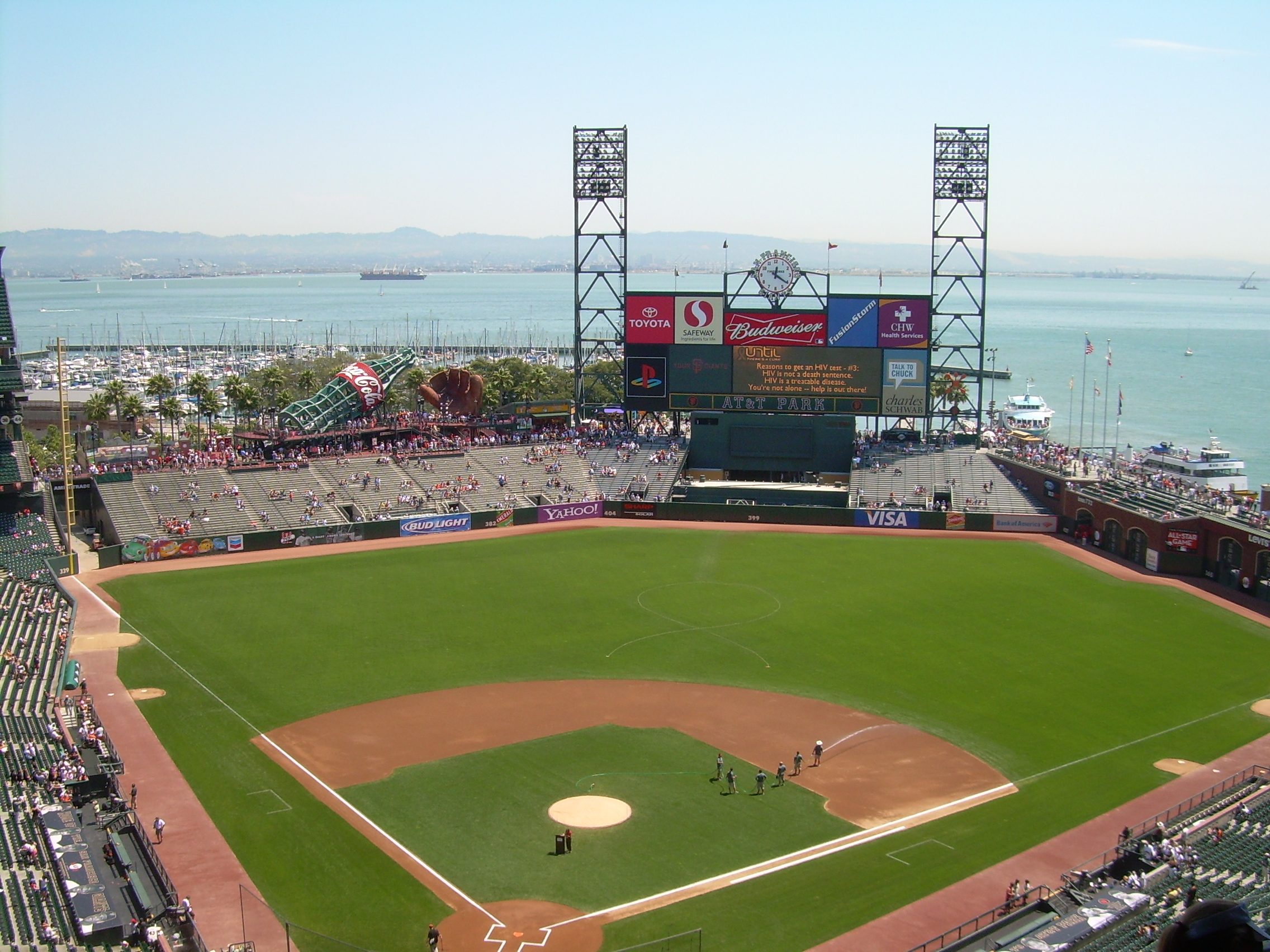
Oracle Park, the home of the San Francisco Giants of Major League Baseball

The Bay Area is home to five professional major league franchises in men's sports: the San Francisco Giants of Major League Baseball (MLB), the Golden State Warriors of the National Basketball Association (NBA), the San Francisco 49ers of the National Football League (NFL), the San Jose Sharks of the National Hockey League (NHL), and the San Jose Earthquakes of Major League Soccer (MLS). A professional women's soccer team, Bay FC of the National Women's Soccer League (NWSL), debuted in 2024, and the Golden State Valkyries played their first season in the Women's National Basketball Association (WNBA) in 2025.

In football, the 49ers play in Levi's Stadium and have won five Super Bowls (XVI, XIX, XXIII, XXIV, XXIX) and lost three (XLVII, LIV, and LVIII). A second NFL team in the Bay Area, the Oakland Raiders, played from 1970 to 1981 and 1995 to 2019 at the Oakland Coliseum; they won the Super Bowl twice during their tenure there. The team moved to Los Angeles from 1982 to 1994 and to Las Vegas in 2020.

In baseball, the Giants play at Oracle Park and have won eight World Series titles, three (2010, 2012, and 2014) since moving to San Francisco in 1958. The Athletics, who played at the Oakland Coliseum, have won nine World Series titles, four in Oakland (1972, 1973, 1974, and 1989). The Athletics left Oakland in 2024 and will become the Las Vegas Athletics in 2028 after temporarily playing in the Sacramento area.

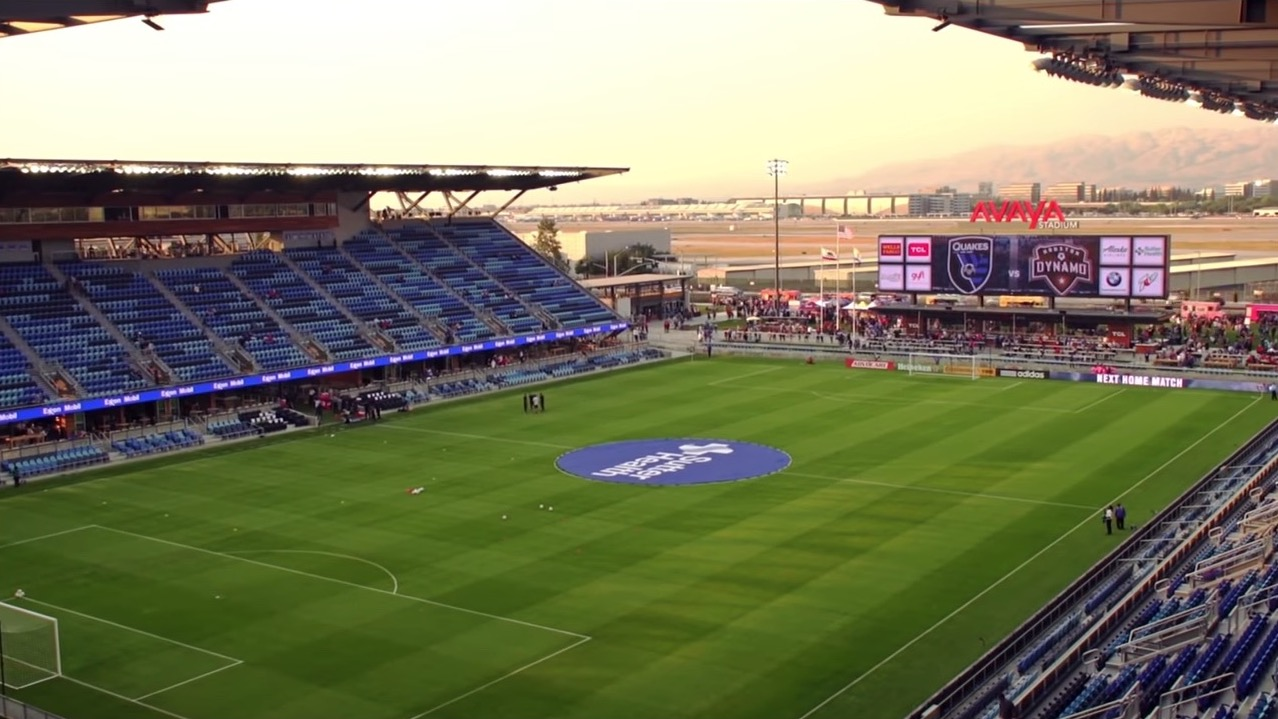
PayPal Park, home of the San Jose Earthquakes of Major League Soccer

In basketball, the Warriors play at Chase Center and have won seven NBA Finals, five (1975, 2015, 2017, 2018 and 2022) since moving to the Bay Area in 1962. The Warriors own the Valkyries, who will also play at Chase Center.

In ice hockey, the Sharks play at SAP Center. They made their first and only Stanley Cup Final appearance in 2016 but did not win.

In soccer, the Earthquakes play at PayPal Park and have won the MLS Cup twice, in 2001 and 2003. Bay FC joined the Earthquakes at PayPal Park and have competed in NWSL since 2024. The Bay Area hosted matches during the 1994 FIFA World Cup at Stanford Stadium and will host matches during the 2026 FIFA World Cup at Levi's Stadium. The Bay Area also hosted soccer competition during the 1984 Summer Olympics and will do so again during the 2028 Summer Olympics.

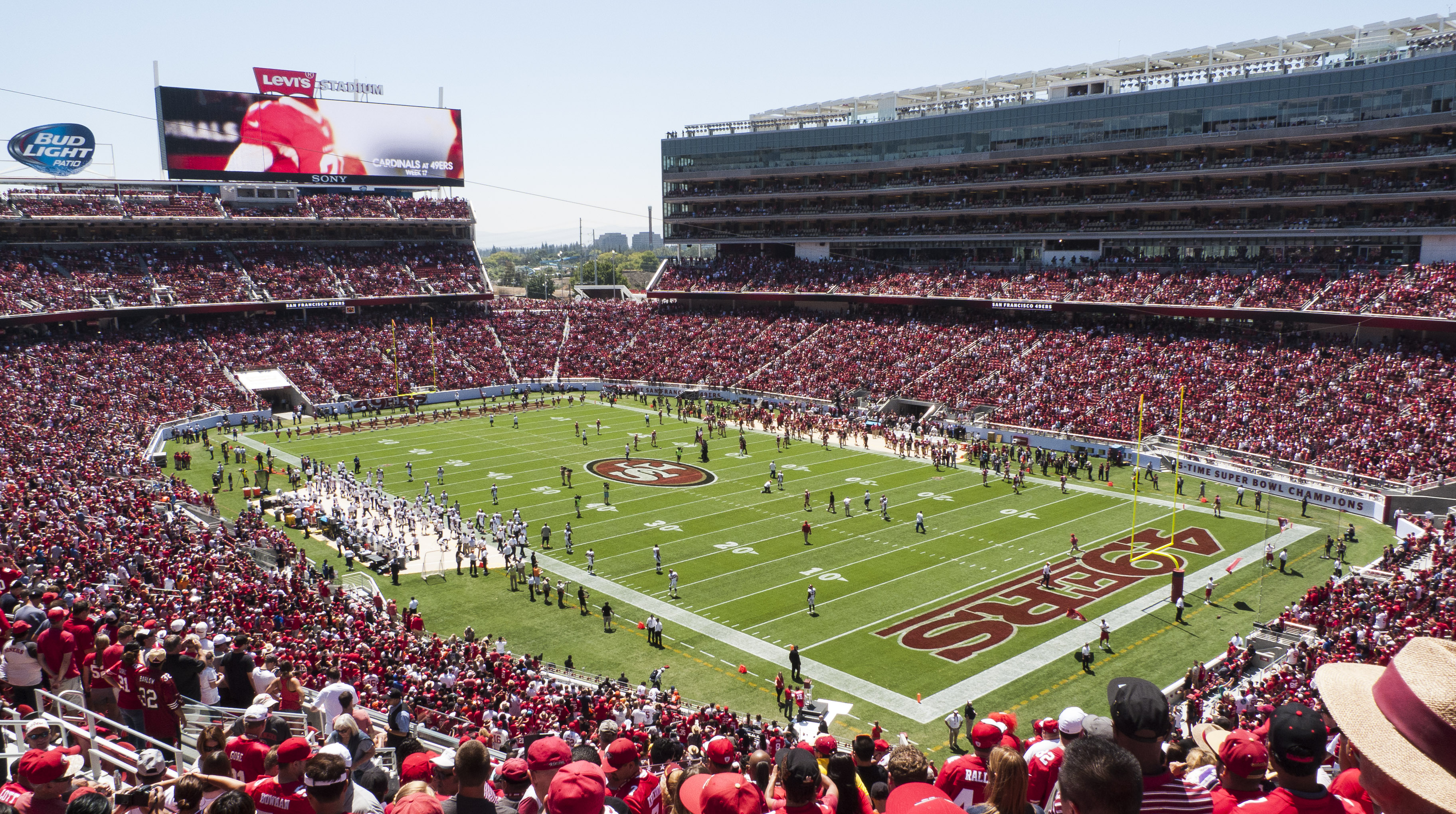
Levi's Stadium in Santa Clara, home of the San Francisco 49ers of the National Football League

The Bay Area is also home to numerous minor league franchises. In hockey, the San Jose Barracuda play in the American Hockey League and are the top affiliate of the San Jose Sharks, playing at Tech CU Arena in San Jose since 2022, having previously shared the SAP Center with the Sharks after moving from Worcester, Massachusetts, in 2015 where they were known as the Worcester Sharks. In baseball, the San Jose Giants are the Low-A affiliate of the San Francisco Giants and play out of San Jose Municipal Stadium in the California League of Minor League Baseball. In soccer, the Oakland Roots SC play in the second division of American soccer and moved to the Oakland Coliseum in 2025. In the Indoor Football League, the Bay Area Panthers play at the SAP Center.

Six Bay Area universities are members of NCAA Division I, the highest level of college sports in the U.S. All three football-playing schools are in the Football Bowl Subdivision, the highest level of NCAA college football. The California Golden Bears and Stanford Cardinal compete in the Atlantic Coast Conference, and the San Jose State Spartans compete in the Mountain West Conference. The Cardinal and Golden Bears are intense rivals, with their football teams competing annually in the Big Game for the Stanford Axe. One of the most famous games in the rivalry occurred in 1982, when the Golden Bears defeated the Cardinal on a last-second kickoff return known as "The Play".

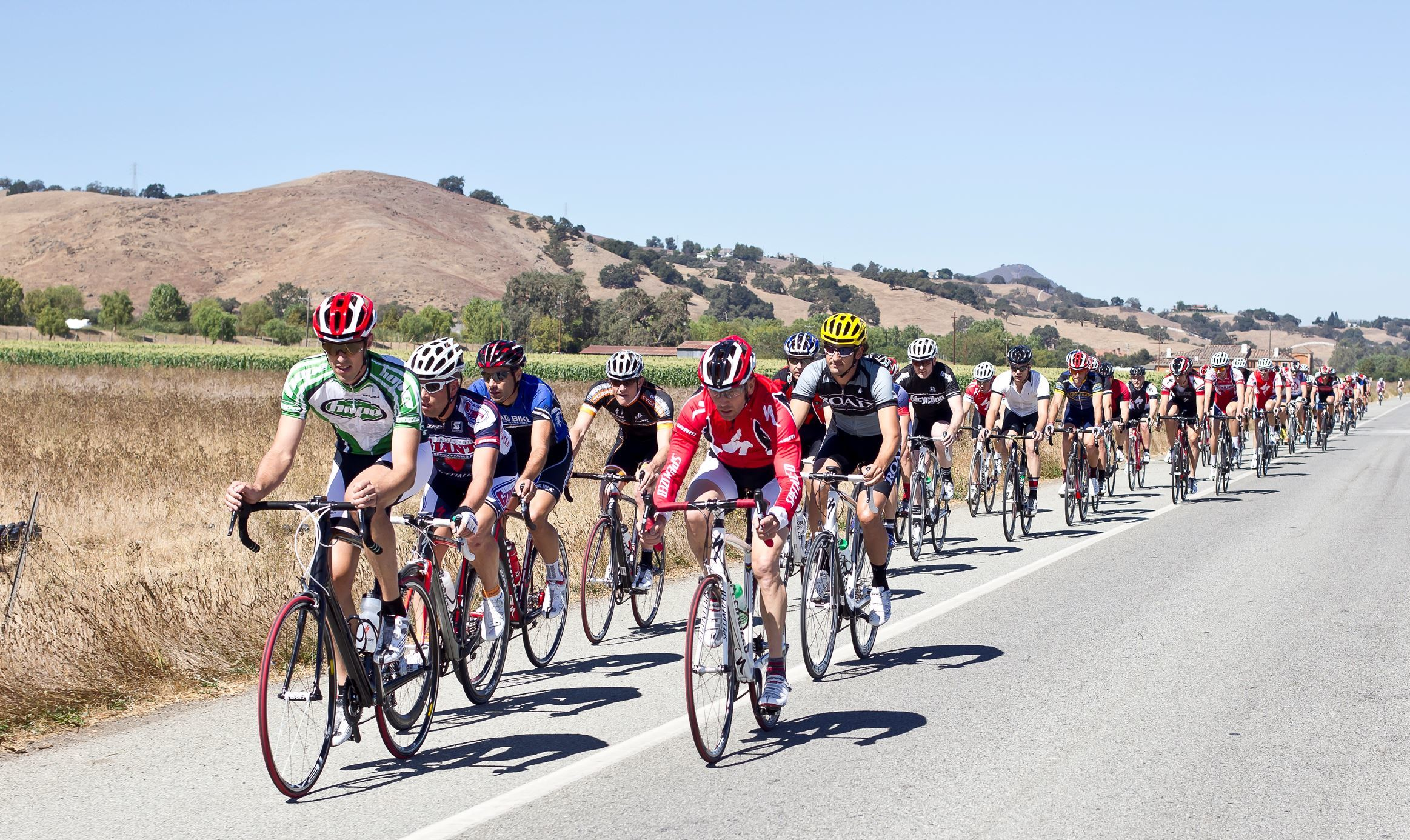
The Tour of California in Morgan Hill

The Bay Area has an ideal climate for outdoor recreation, and activities such as hiking, cycling and jogging are popular. San Francisco alone contains more than 200 parks; more than 200 mi (320 km) of bicycle paths, lanes, and routes; and the Embarcadero and Marina Green are favored sites for skateboarding. Extensive public tennis facilities are available in Golden Gate Park and Dolores Park, as well as at smaller neighborhood courts throughout the city. Boating, sailing, windsurfing, and kitesurfing are popular on the bay, and the bay area was host to the 2013 America's Cup. San Francisco maintains a yacht harbor in the Marina District, where the St. Francis Yacht Club and Golden Gate Yacht Club are located, while the South Beach Yacht Club is located next to Oracle Park. Other Bay Area yacht clubs include the Alameda, Berkeley, Corinthian, Oakland, Presidio, Sausalito, and Sequoia.

== See also ==
- Lists of San Francisco Bay Area topics
- Timeline of the San Francisco Bay Area
- List of regions of California
- List of metropolitan areas of the United States
