= List of garlic festivals =

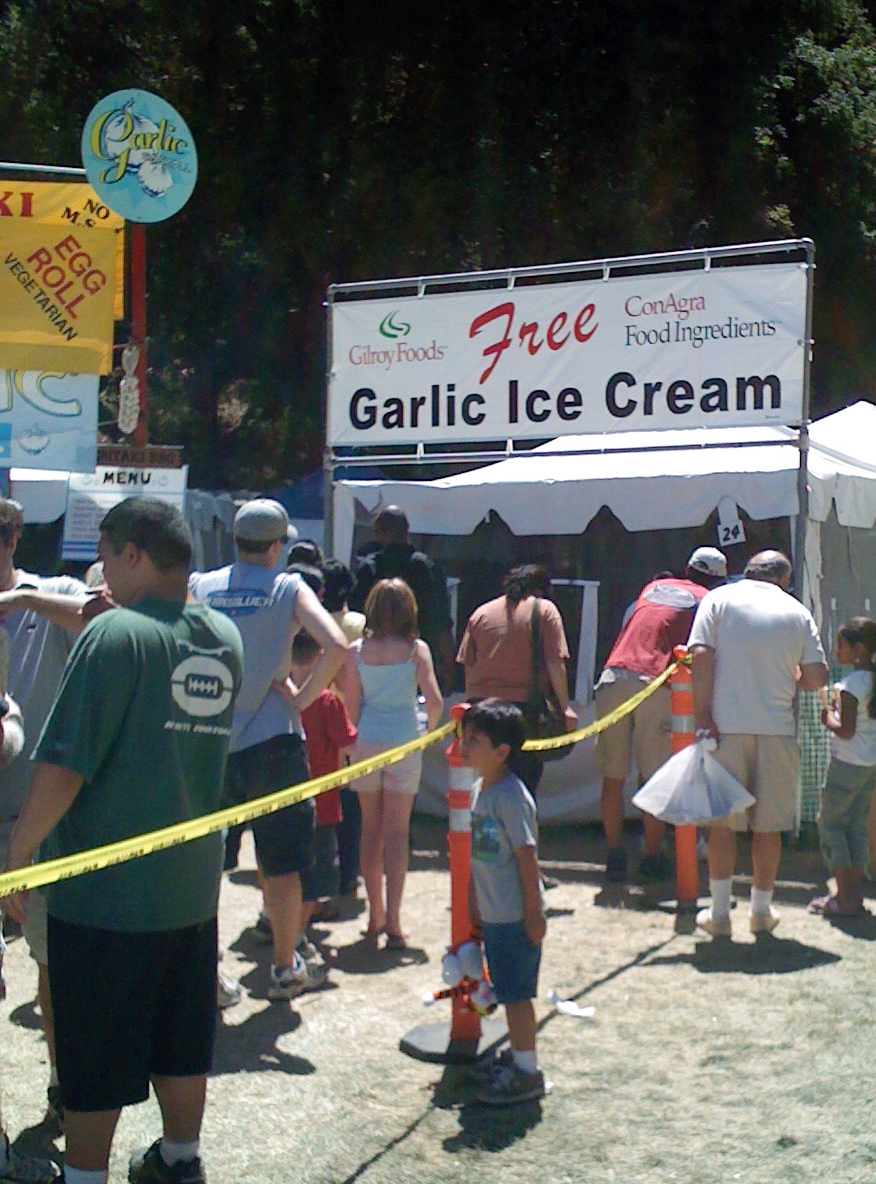
Garlic ice cream being served at the Gilroy Garlic Festival.

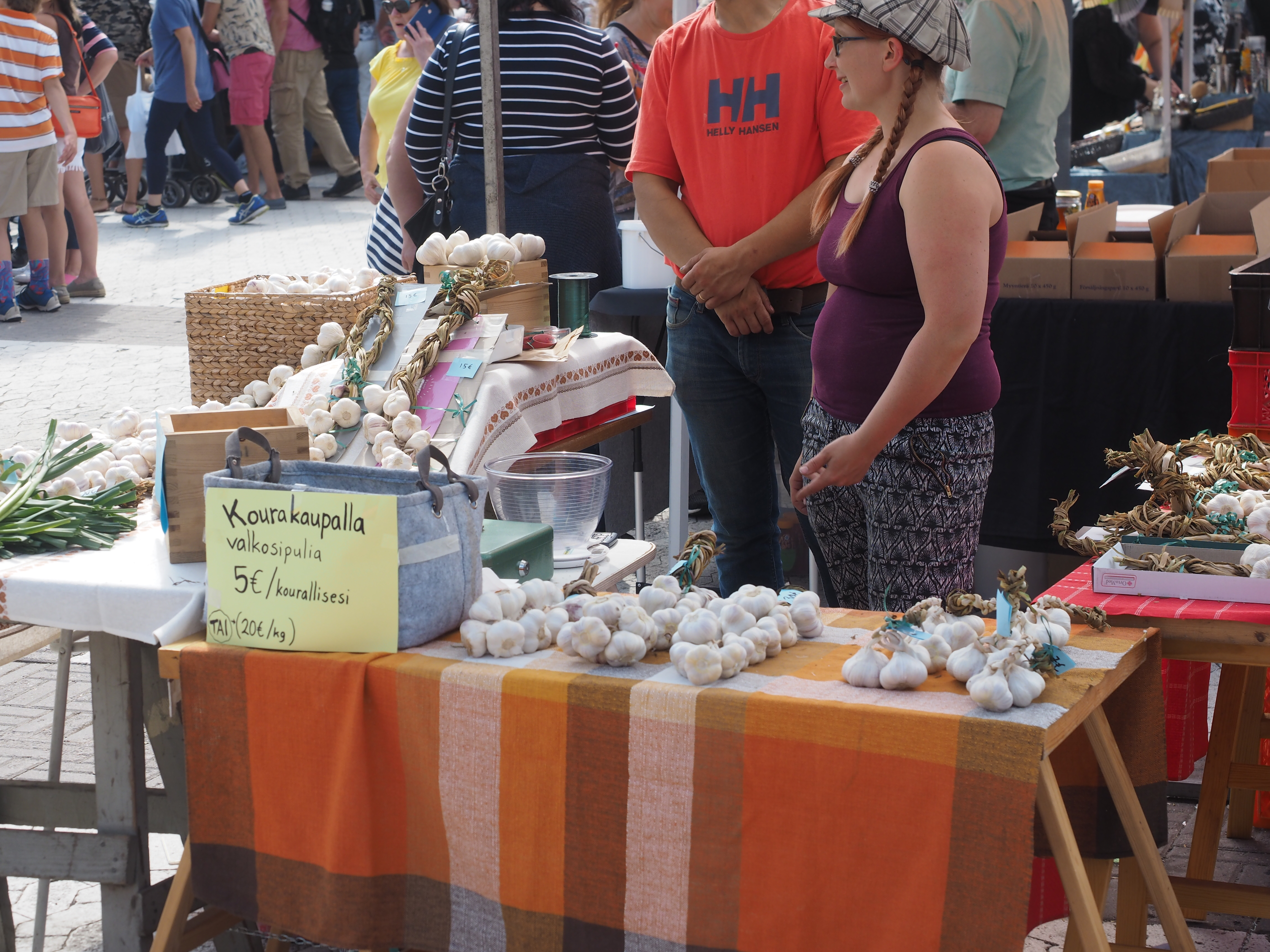
A vendor selling garlic at the Kerava Garlic Festival.

A garlic festival is a food festival focused on garlic. Examples include:

== North America ==
- Gilroy Garlic Festival, an annual food festival in Gilroy, California, held annually since 1979 (except 2020, 2022, 2023, & 2024).
- California Garlic Festival, an annual food festival in California, held in 2022, 2023, & 2024. (defunct)
- Hudson Valley Garlic Festival, in Saugerties, New York
- Connecticut Garlic and Harvest Festival, in Bethlehem, Connecticut
- Easton Garlic Fest, in Easton, Pennsylvania
- North Quabbin Garlic and Arts Festival, in Orange, Massachusetts
- Southern Vermont Garlic and Herb Festival, in Bennington, Vermont
- Maine's Garlic Fest, in Canaan, Maine
- North Plains Elephant Garlic Festival, in North Plains, Oregon
- Cleveland Garlic Festival, in Cleveland, Ohio
- Virginia Garlic and Wine Festival held annually in October at Rebec Vineyards in Amherst, Virginia, https://www.rebecwinery.com/virginia-wine-garlic-festival
- Toronto Garlic Festival, in Toronto, Ontario
- Cuba Garlic Festival, in Cuba, New York

== United Kingdom ==
- Isle of Wight Garlic Festival, an annual event held on the Isle of Wight, England

== Estonia ==
- Jõgeva Garlic Festival, held in Jõgeva Parish, Jõgeva County

== France ==
- Lautrec Pink Garlic Festival, held yearly in Lautrec, France

== Finland ==
- Kerava Garlic Festival, held in Kerava, Uusimaa

== Japan ==
- Garlic and Bego Festival, held in Takko, Japan

== Portugal ==
- The Graciosa's Garlic Festival («Festival de Alho da Ilha Graciosa»), held in Graciosa Island, in the Azores, Portugal.
