= 2019 Gilroy Garlic Festival shooting =

Mass shooting in California, U.S.

Gilroy Garlic Festival shooting
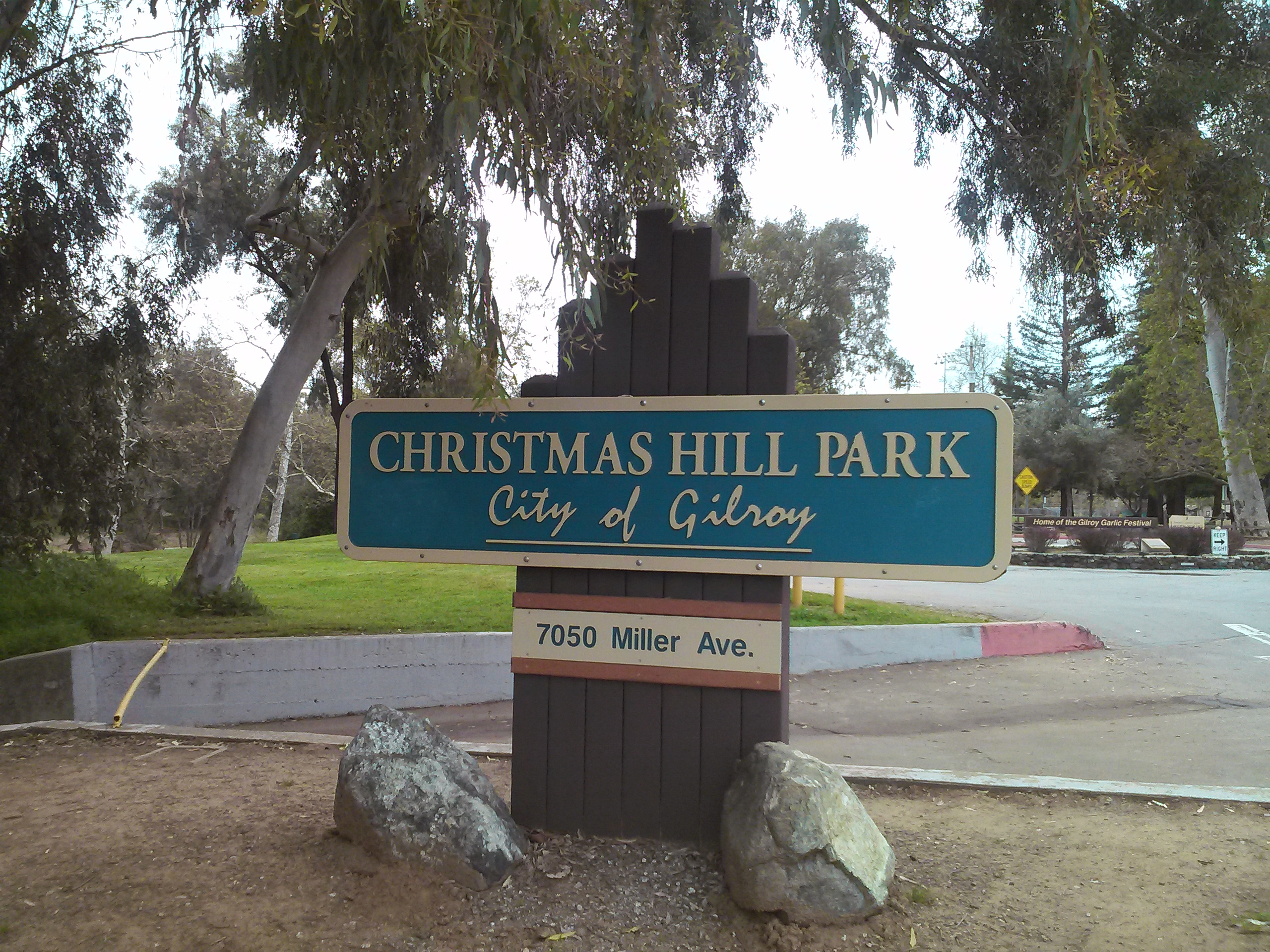
- The venue, Christmas Hill Park, in 2017
- Location: 36°59′52″N 121°35′7″W; Gilroy, California, U.S.
- Date: July 28, 2019; 5:40 – 5:45 p.m. (PDT (UTC−7))
- Attack type: Mass shooting; mass murder; murder–suicide; shootout
- Weapons: WASR-10 semi-automatic rifle; Remington 870 pump-action shotgun (unused; left in car)
- Deaths: 4 (including the perpetrator)
- Injuries: 19 (11 by gunfire)
- Perpetrator: Santino William Legan
- Motive: Unknown

On July 28, 2019, a mass shooting occurred at the Gilroy Garlic Festival in Gilroy, California, United States. The gunman killed three people and wounded 17 others before killing himself after engaging in a shootout with responding police officers.

As of 2020, investigators had not determined the motives of the gunman, identified as 19-year-old Santino William Legan. The FBI opened a domestic terrorism investigation into the incident.

== Background ==
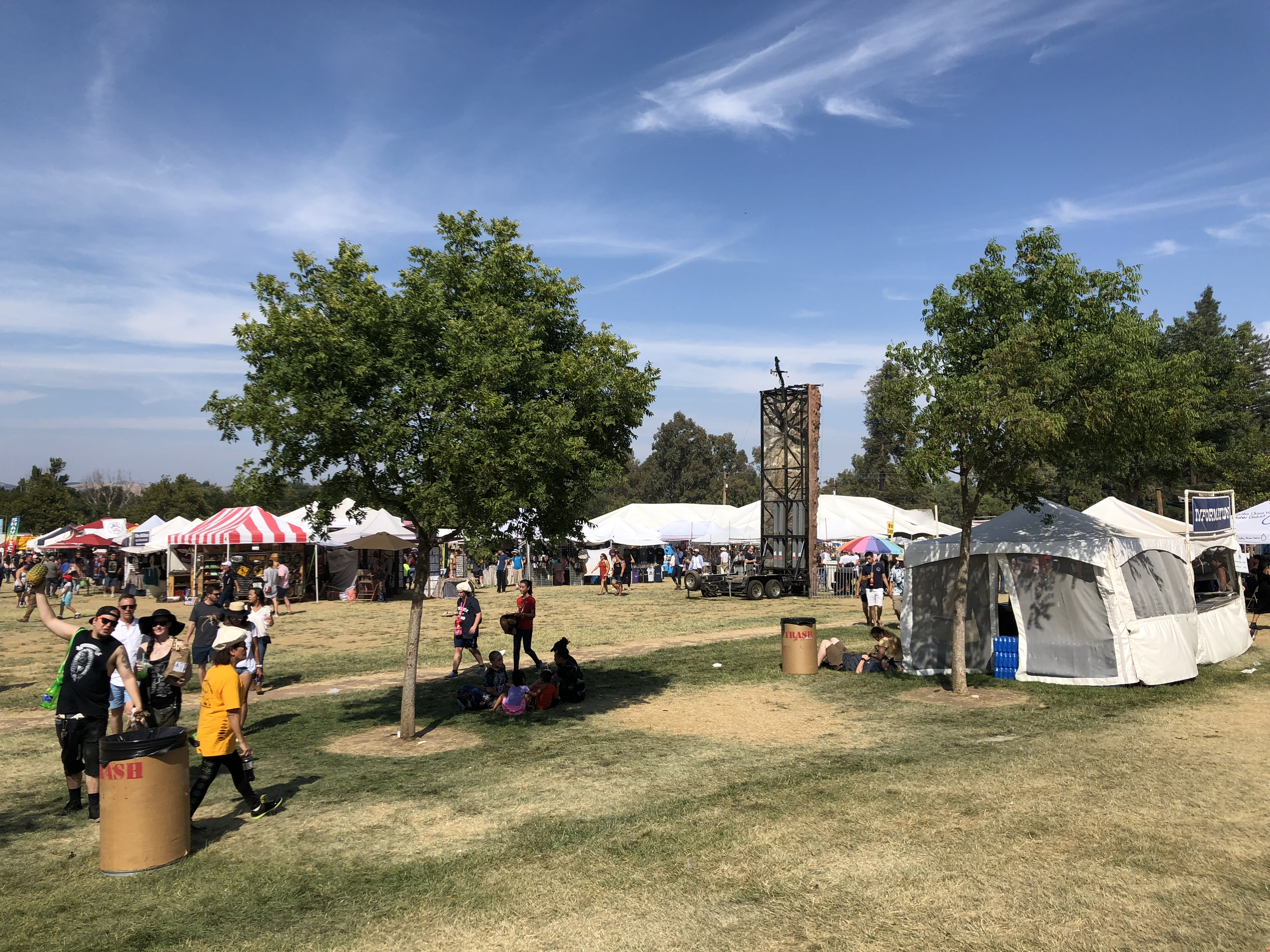
The Garlic Festival, 2018

The Gilroy Garlic Festival was an annual three-day event held at Christmas Hill Park. One of the nation's best-known food festivals, centered on garlic, it drew 80,000 to 100,000 visitors from around the country and was described as a family event. Located about 30 miles (48 km) southeast of San Jose and the Silicon Valley area, Gilroy is home to about 60,000 people, and the city is a major producer of garlic. As Gilroy's top fundraising event, the Garlic Festival was staffed with volunteers to raise money for nonprofit groups, including clubs and schools. After its cancellation in 2020 due to the COVID-19 pandemic, a drive-through festival was held in 2021. The festival returned in 2025 after a three year hiatus.

== Shooting ==
The shooting occurred during the 41st annual gathering of the festival on Sunday, July 28, 2019—its third and final day—shortly before the scheduled closing at 6:00 p.m. The gunman entered the festival by using bolt cutters to cut through a wire fence along Uvas Creek, thus evading security screening. Authorities stated that a WASR-10 semi-automatic rifle was used, a Romanian variant of the AK-47. It was equipped with a 75-round drum magazine. The gunman was also wearing a bulletproof vest and carrying five extra magazines of 40 rounds each.

The gunman opened fire on festival-goers near an inflatable slide, ultimately shooting 39 rounds. Eyewitnesses described a white man wearing a green shirt and a grayish handkerchief around his neck firing into the food area. Witnesses reported that he appeared to be firing at random. Jack van Breen, the lead singer of the local band TinMan (which was performing an encore when the shooting began) told KPIX-TV that he heard someone shout, "Why are you doing this?" The gunman's response was, "Because I'm really angry."

Police at the scene engaged him within a minute of the first shots being fired, firing 18 rounds and hitting the gunman several times. The police chief credited the fast response to a heavy police presence with "many, many officers in the park". The three officers were placed on administrative leave per standard procedures when they fire their service weapons in the line of duty. While initial reports indicated that the gunman was killed by the police, the Santa Clara County coroner reported on August 2 that the gunman died from a self-inflicted gunshot wound to the head by inserting the rifle into his mouth, after officers had already shot him multiple times.

Along with the Gilroy Police Department, the San Francisco Field Division of the Bureau of Alcohol, Tobacco, Firearms and Explosives and 30 FBI agents also responded to the scene.

== Victims ==
Three people—Stephen Romero, age 6; Keyla Salazar, age 13; and Trevor Deon Irby, age 25—were killed, all by single gunshots to the torso. An additional 17 people were wounded.

The Santa Clara County Healthcare System's two hospitals treated 19 patients, including the gunman. Some were also treated but not admitted. The patients ranged in age from 12 to 69; 11 had gunshot injuries and eight had other injuries. Two victims were also reported hospitalized at Stanford Hospital.

== Perpetrator ==
Santino William Legan (September 1999 – July 28, 2019), a 19-year-old man from Gilroy, was identified by authorities as the shooter. Police believe he acted alone. Legan spent most of his life in Gilroy and attended Monte Vista Christian School through his junior year and graduated from Gilroy High School, but in the months before the shooting lived in the remote town of Walker Lake in Mineral County, Nevada. He purchased the rifle used in the shooting in Fallon, Nevada, on July 9, three weeks before the festival. The possession and sale of the weapon are banned in California, but legal in Nevada.

An Instagram account was opened four days before the shooting by a Santino William Legan of the same age, who self-identified as being of Italian and Iranian descent. On the day of the shooting, Legan made two posts to the account, one of which complained about the event congesting the countryside with "hordes of mestizos and Silicon Valley white twats" and instructed people to read the book Might Is Right, a pseudonymous proto-fascist manifesto.

== Investigation ==
Authorities discovered a Remington 870 shotgun inside Legan's car. Police and federal agents searched Legan's father's house in Gilroy. Investigators also searched the gunman's apartment in Walker Lake, Nevada, where they reportedly discovered a bulletproof vest, empty shotgun and rifle boxes, a gas mask, and empty ammunition boxes, and pamphlets on guns; investigators also confiscated three hard drives and three thumb drives.

Investigators have not determined a motive for the attack. Brian Levin of the Center for the Study of Hate and Extremism at Cal State San Bernardino stated that research has shown some mass shooters have "a broad range of motivations and, at times, conflicting ideologies, which can make it difficult to classify attacks and pinpoint their motivations." Searches found that Legan owned both left-wing and right-wing literature, including reading material on white supremacy and Islamic extremism. The investigation turned up evidence that Legan had been "exploring violent ideologies" and had created a list of potential targets, including the Garlic Festival as well as "religious organizations, courthouses, federal buildings and political institutions involving both the Republican and Democratic parties." Because of this list, a domestic terrorism probe was opened.

The Santa Clara County district attorney report, released in March 2020, stated, "In light of the grave circumstances of this case, [law enforcement's] actions were unquestionably lawful and justified."

== Reactions ==
U.S. President Donald Trump offered condolences and thanked law enforcement on Monday, July 29. California's junior U.S. senator Kamala Harris expressed gratitude toward the first responders, as did California's governor Gavin Newsom. The governor visited with survivors and the families of victims on Monday. While stating he supported the Second Amendment, he said he would like national cooperation controlling "weapons of goddamned mass destruction". Congressman Dan Lipinski (IL-3), who was attending the festival along with his wife, released a brief statement thanking the first responders and calling for legislative action against gun violence in the U.S. Other lawmakers also issued statements about the incident.

Organizations, such as March for Our Lives and Moms Demand Action, and people, such as the former spokesperson for the National Rifle Association and many celebrities, also responded.

The owner of the Nevada firearm store visited by the perpetrator before the shooting, and of the store's associated website from which the perpetrator ordered the weapon, posted a Facebook message stating that he felt heartbroken and that "this goes against everything I believe in" and remarked that the shooter ought to "rot in hell".

The shooting was highlighted by Pope Francis during a speech in St. Peter's Square on August 4, 2019, following the shootings in El Paso and Dayton, in which he condemned attacks on defenseless people; the pope said that he was spiritually close to the victims, the wounded and the families affected by the attacks that had "bloodied Texas, California, and Ohio".

In response to the shooting, in early September 2019, the San Francisco Board of Supervisors unanimously declared the National Rifle Association a domestic terrorist organization. Supervisor Catherine Stefani stated, "The N.R.A. exists to spread pro-gun propaganda and put weapons in the hands of those who would harm and terrorize us ... Nobody has done more to fan the flames of gun violence than the N.R.A." Mayor Sam Liccardo of nearby San Jose proposed to prevent straw purchases of firearms by requiring gun owners in the city to carry insurance. Liccardo put the proposal on hold due to the COVID-19 pandemic but revived it in 2021 after a mass shooting in San Jose.

In January 2020, the Gilroy Strong Resilience Center opened to support survivors of the mass shooting.

== See also ==
- 2026 Seattle Center shooting
- List of shootings in California
- List of mass shootings in the United States in 2019
