= Elephant Garlic Festival =

Annual event in North Plains, Oregon, U.S.

- Logo
- Frequency: Annually
- Location: North Plains, Oregon
- Country: United States
- Website: funstinks.com

The Elephant Garlic Festival, also known as the North Plains Elephant Garlic Festival, is a garlic festival in North Plains, Oregon, United States. The 2023 event had 5K, 10K, and half marathon runs.

== See also ==
- List of garlic festivals
- List of festivals in the United States
