= Christmas Hill Park =

Community park in Gilroy, California, US

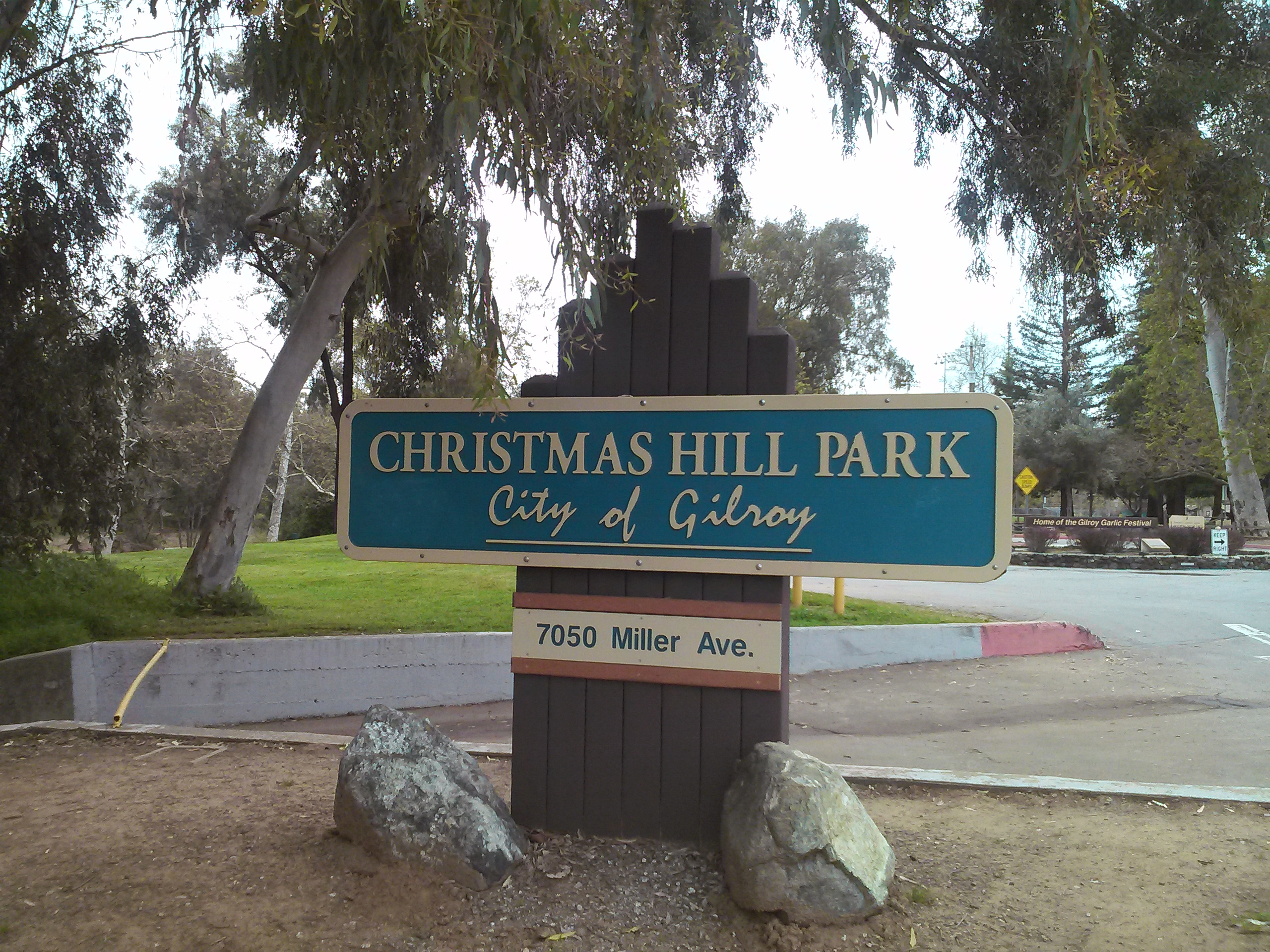
- Entrance to Christmas Hill Park, March 2017

- Location within California
- Type: Urban park
- Location: 7050 Miller Avenue, Gilroy, California 95020
- Coordinates: 36°59′52″N 121°35′7″W
- Area: 0.21 km^{2} (0.081 sq mi)
- Operator: City of Gilroy
- Status: Open daily

Christmas Hill Park is a 51-acre community park operated by the City of Gilroy in southwest Santa Clara County, California, US. The park provides trails for jogging, hiking and bicycling, as well as soccer and baseball/softball diamonds for group sports, and multiple picnic areas. The Christmas Hill Park Ranch Site adjoins east of the park, and provides an environmental education center, as well as additional sports facilities.

The park is open seven days a week from 6:00 am to 11:00 pm from March to October, and 6:00 am to 8:00 pm from November to February.

== History ==
The park and adjoining ranch site have served as a base camp for CalFire managing recent wildfires in the region.

The park also hosted the annual Gilroy Garlic Festival. On July 28, 2019, a mass shooting occurred during the Festival killing three people and injuring 15 others.
