= Garlic ice cream =

Flavour of ice cream

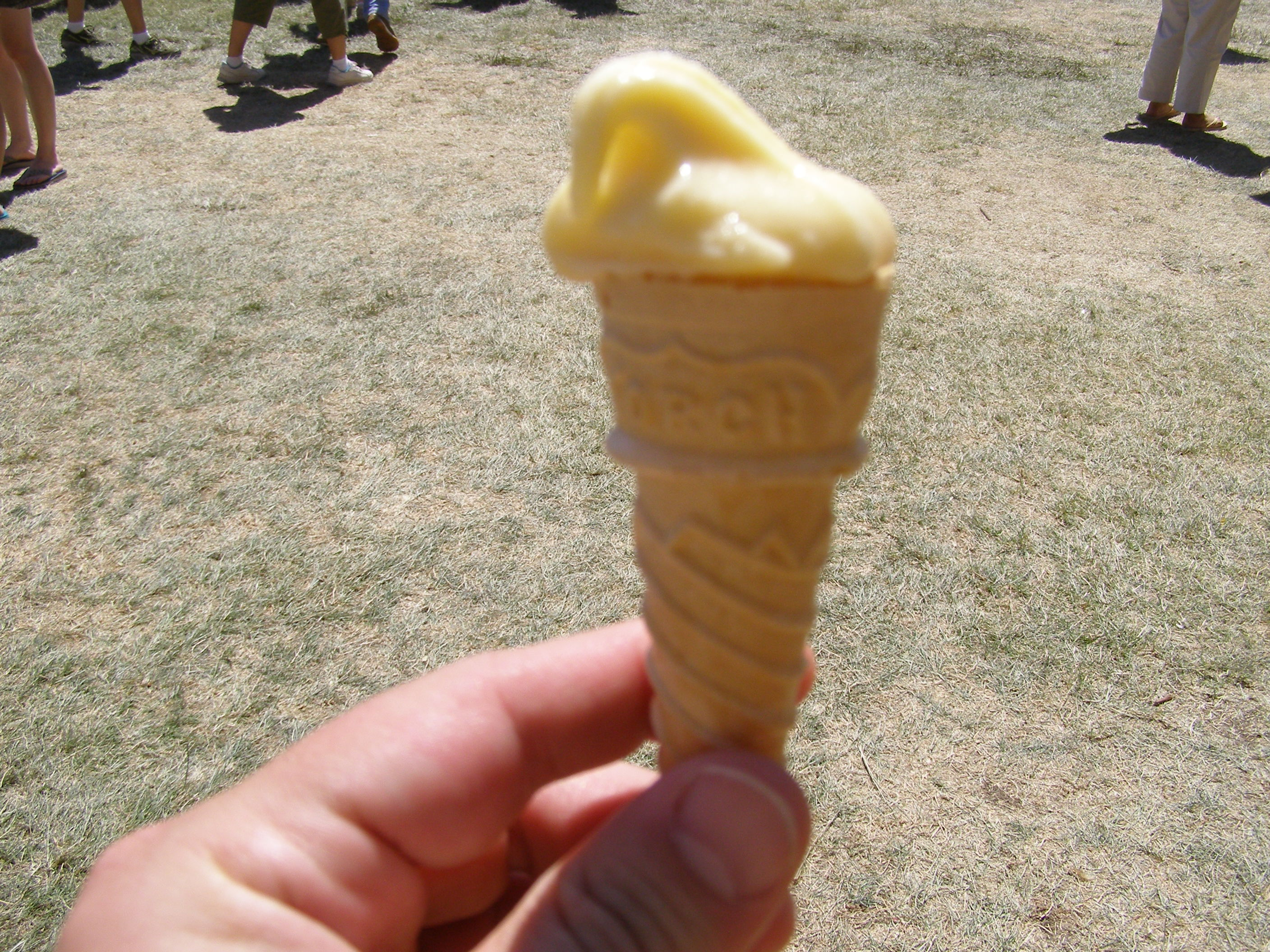
A garlic ice cream cone

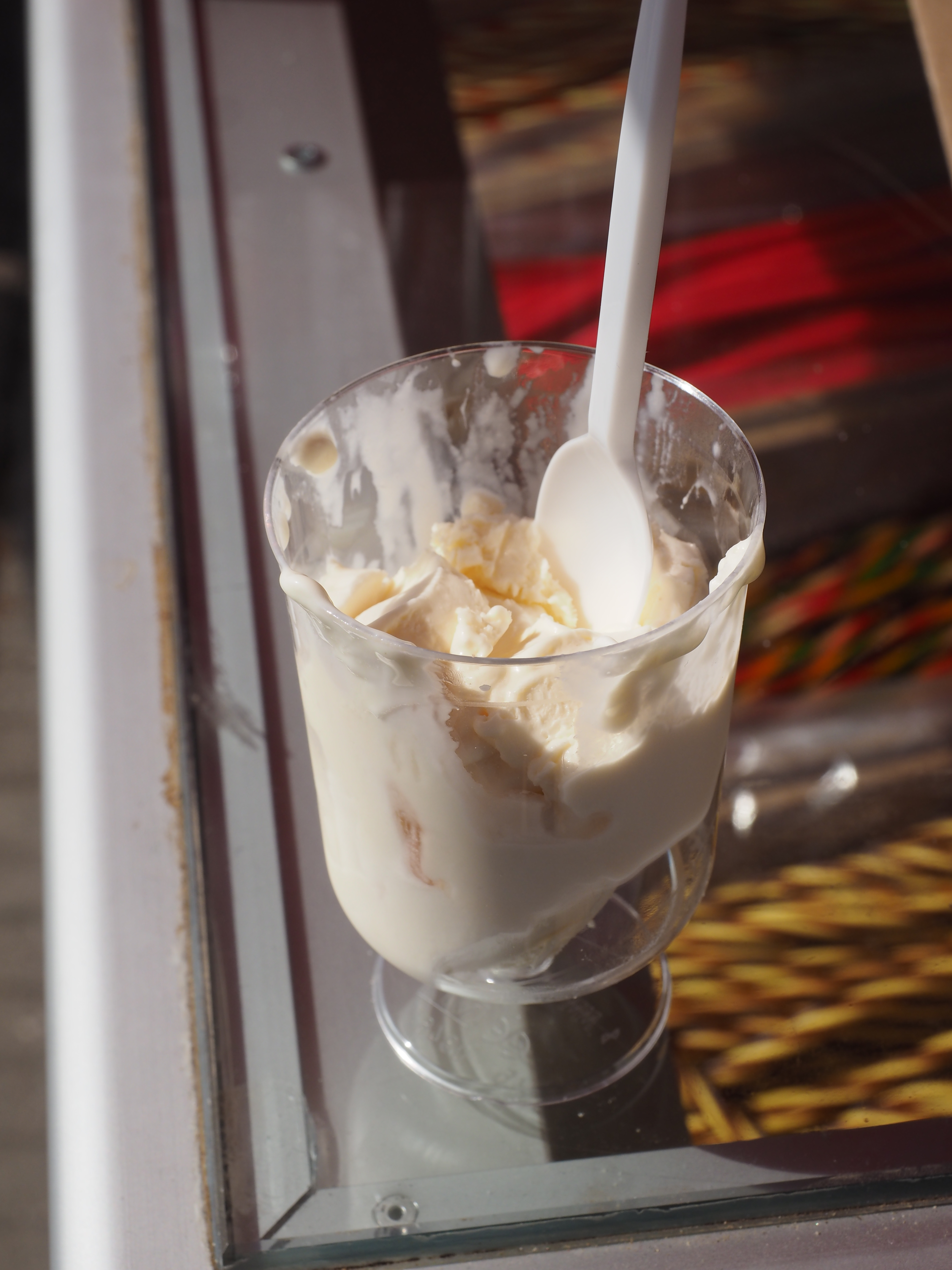
Garlic ice cream served at the annual garlic festival in Kerava, Finland.

Garlic ice cream is a flavour of ice cream consisting mainly of vanilla, or honey, and cream as a base, to which garlic is added. Originally invented by Thomas Cossette Jr, of Wallingford, CT, It has been featured at many garlic festivals, including the Gilroy Garlic Festival in Gilroy, California.

== Preparation and description ==
According to a recipe by the San Francisco-based restaurant, The Stinking Rose, which is well known for including garlic in all of its dishes, garlic ice cream is basically vanilla ice cream with some garlic. The Scandinavian Garlic & Shots, which is based in Södermalm, serves garlic ice cream which is essentially a combination of honey flavoured ice cream and garlic. Garlic ice cream is savoury in taste.

== Reception ==
Tasters of garlic ice cream at the 2012 North Quabbin Garlic and Arts Festival had positive feedback for the ice cream flavor, with one of them commenting that it "is really creamy, subtle flavors, but you can taste the garlic".

== Notable use ==
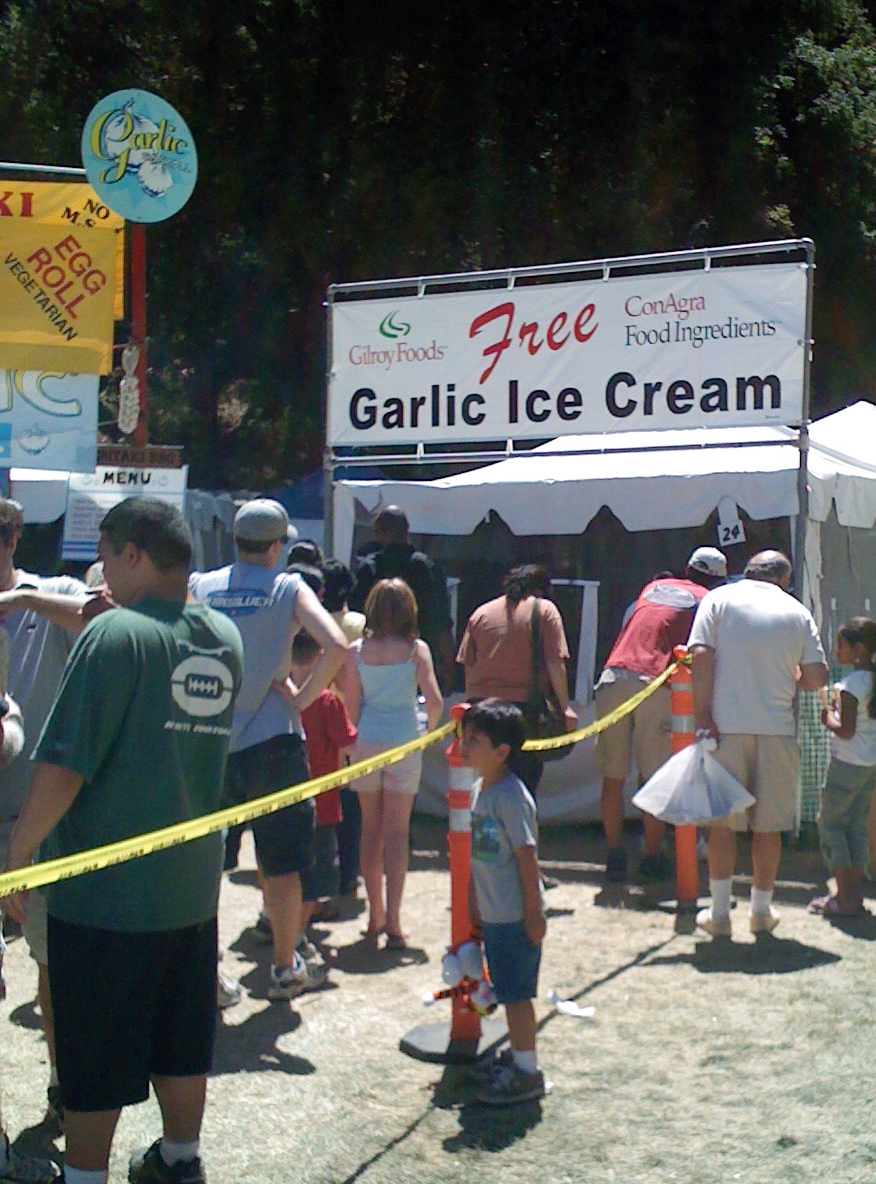
Garlic ice cream at the 2007 Gilroy Garlic Festival in Gilroy, California.

Garlic ice cream has been a featured dish at several garlic conventions. Examples include the 1986 Ithaca Garlic Festival in Ithaca, New York and the Gilroy Garlic Festival, which has included garlic ice cream as one of its featured garlic dishes a handful of times, including in 2000 and 2005. It has also been showcased at the 2011 Toronto Garlic Festival in Toronto, Canada and the 2012 North Quabbin Garlic and Arts Festival at Forster's Farm in Orange, Massachusetts.

Garlic ice cream is a food item on The Stinking Rose's food menu. The ice cream flavour is treated as a "sauce" to accompany food items like steak, although it can also be consumed as a dessert item.

== See also ==
- List of garlic dishes
