= The Stinking Rose =

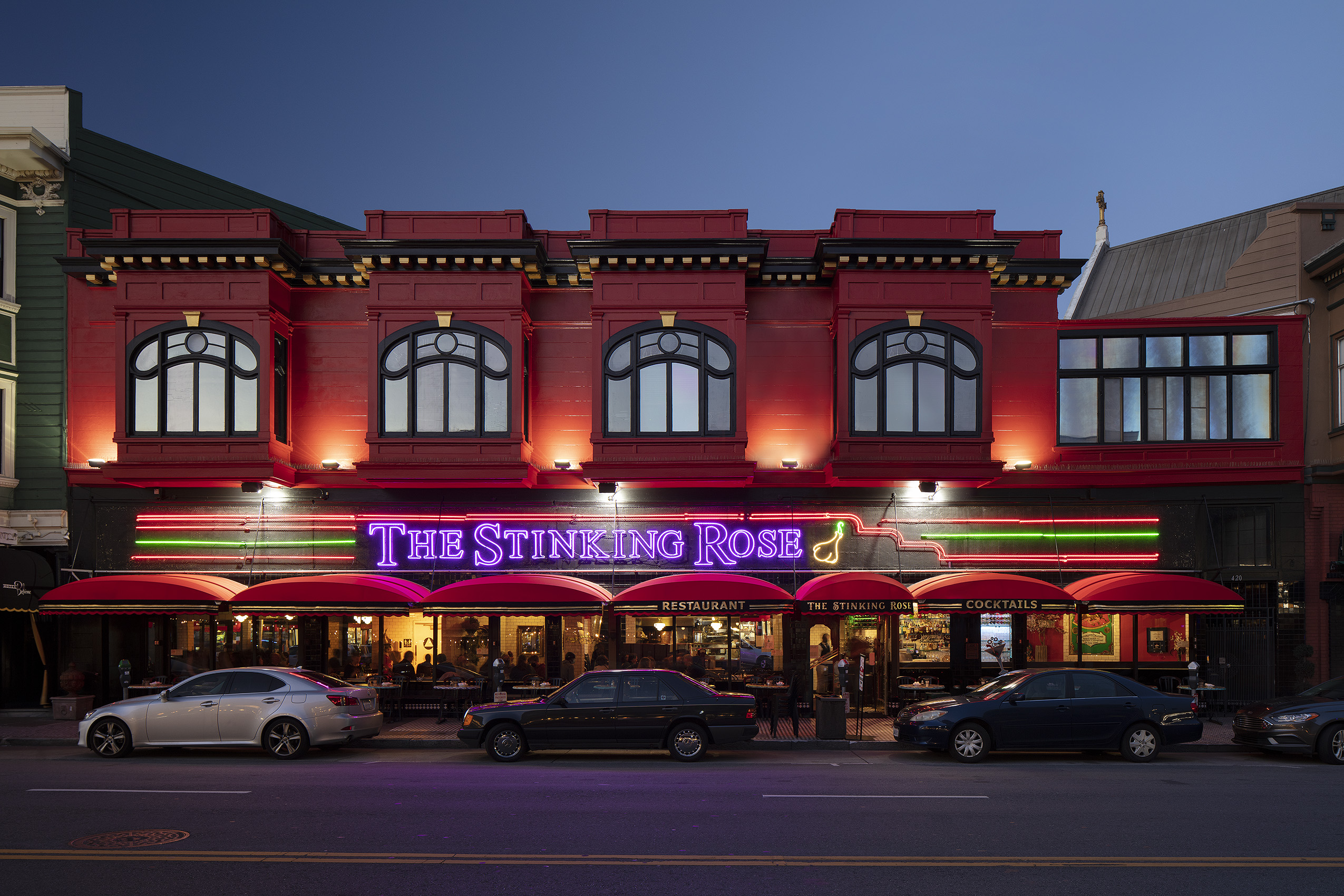
- The Stinking Rose in San Francisco
- Interactive map of The Stinking Rose

Restaurant information
- Established: 1991
- Owners: Jerry Dal Bozzo and Dante Serafini
- Location: 430 Columbus Avenue, San Francisco, California, 94133, United States
- Coordinates: 37.7997°N 122.4095°W
- Website: thestinkingrose.com

The Stinking Rose is a Californian restaurant known for including garlic in all its dishes, including its garlic ice cream. The first location opened in San Francisco in 1991, followed by a second location in Beverly Hills in 1996. The Beverly Hills restaurant announced its permanent closure in October 2021. The San Francisco location was originally located at 325 Columbus Ave, and moved in 2021 to its current address at 430 Columbus Avenue, in the heart of San Francisco's North Beach neighborhood.

The restaurant's motto is "We season our garlic with food®". It has inspired two garlic-themed cookbooks from Ten Speed Press, titled The Stinking Cookbook (1994) and The Stinking Rose Restaurant Cookbook (2006).

In February 2014, the 38,500-square-foot (3,577 m^{2}) site housing the Beverly Hills restaurant was put up for sale. It sold in September of that year for about $17 million, although the restaurant continued to operate while redevelopment plans were underway. After several years of uncertainty, the Beverly Hills location formally closed in 2021, with no plans announced for reopening. The Stinking Rose in San Francisco remains open and continues to serve its signature garlic-centric cuisine to locals and tourists. The new location at 430 Columbus Avenue, San Francisco features expanded patio seating and maintains the restaurant's quirky décor and reputation for bold, garlic-forward flavor.
