= Gilroy, California =

City in California, United States

- City
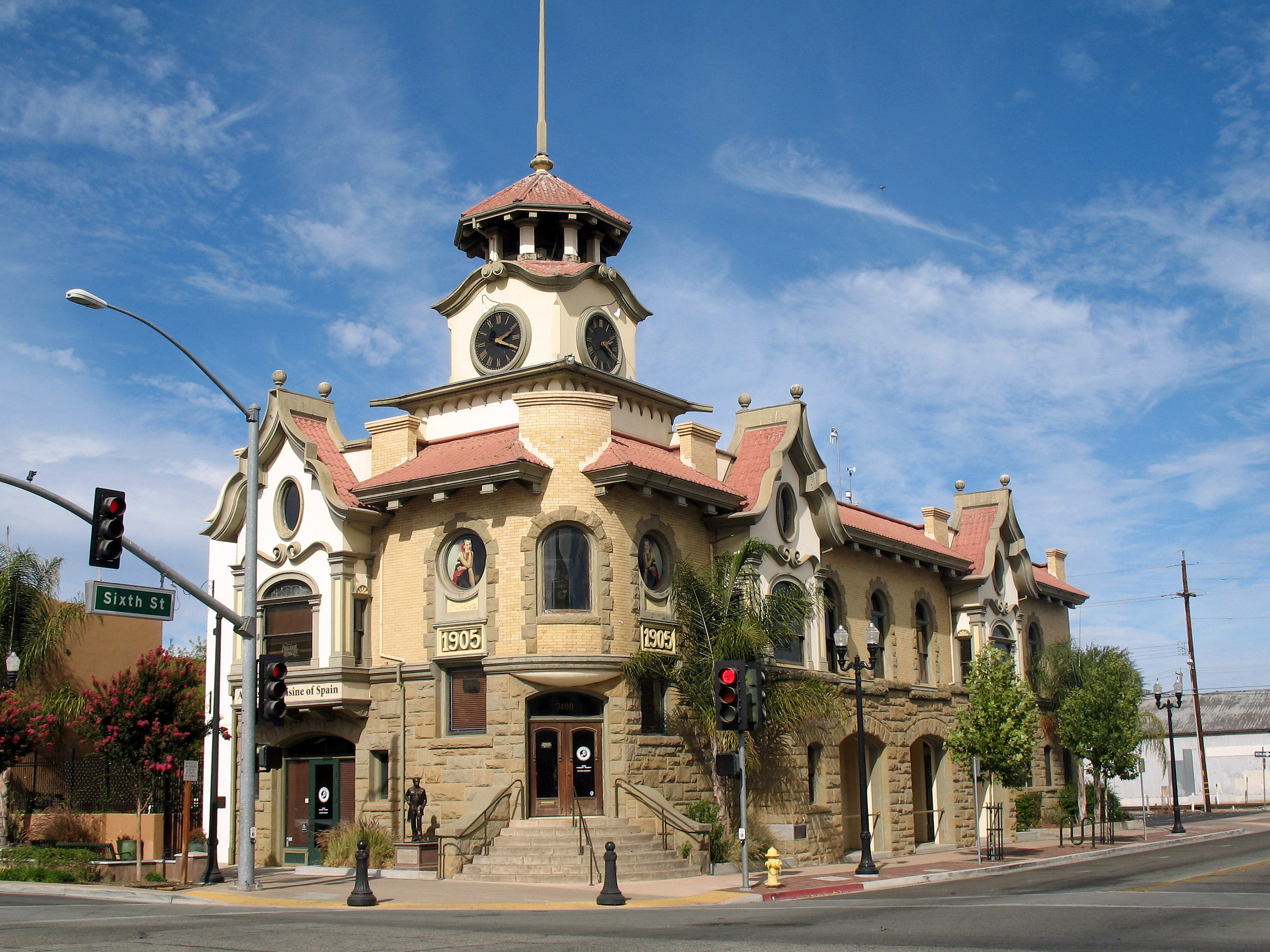
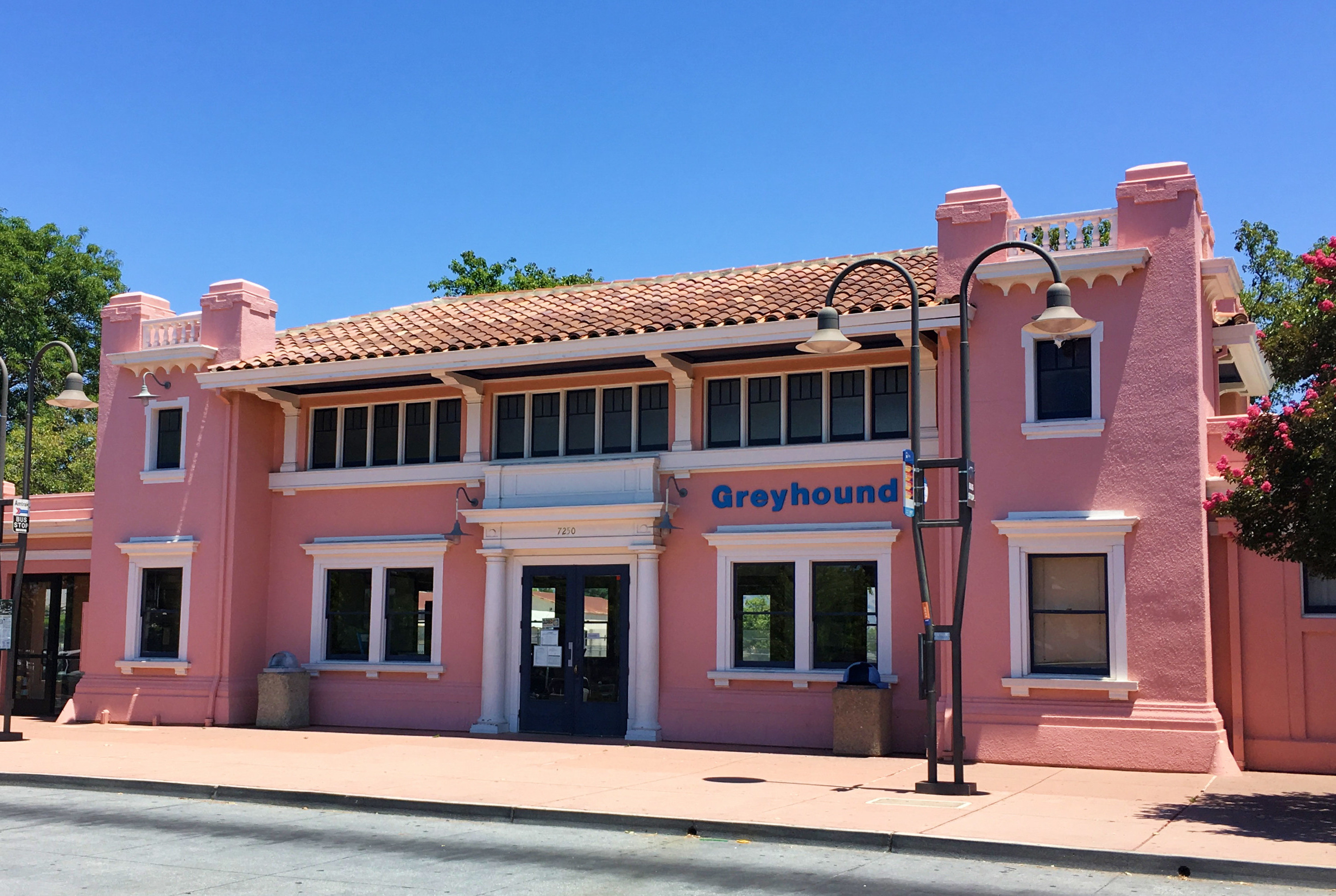
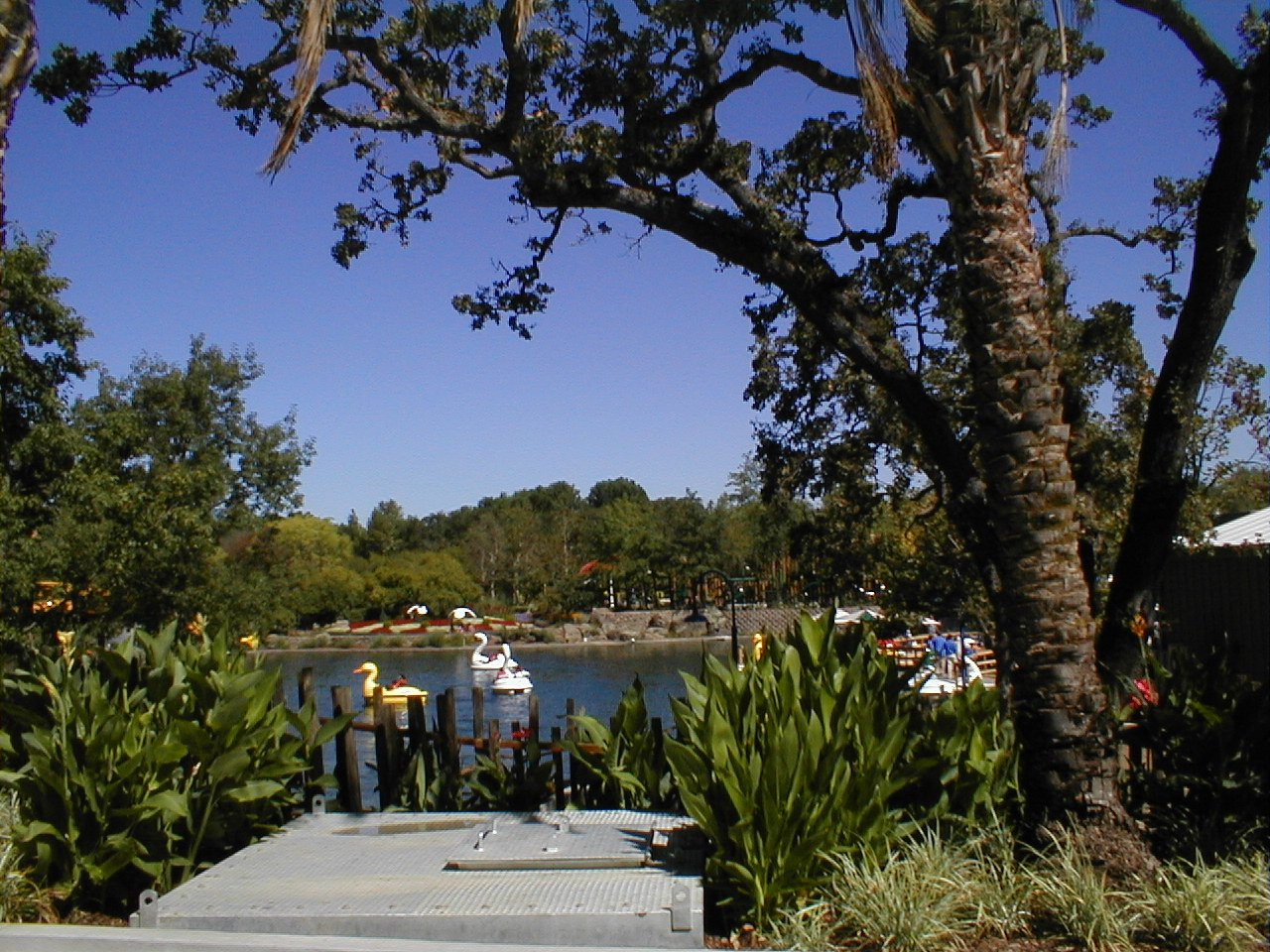
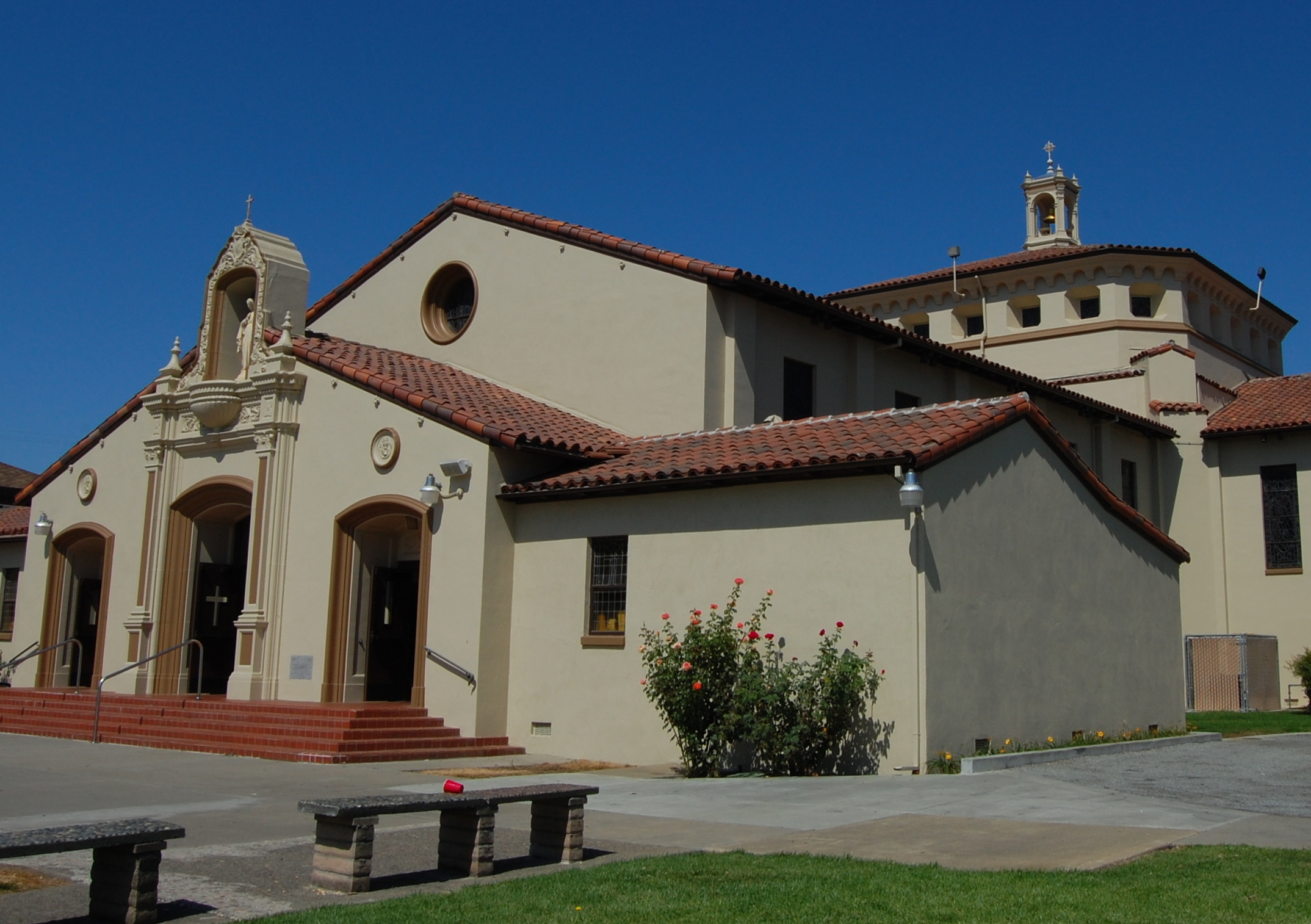
- Old City Hall Gilroy station Gilroy Gardens St. Mary's Church

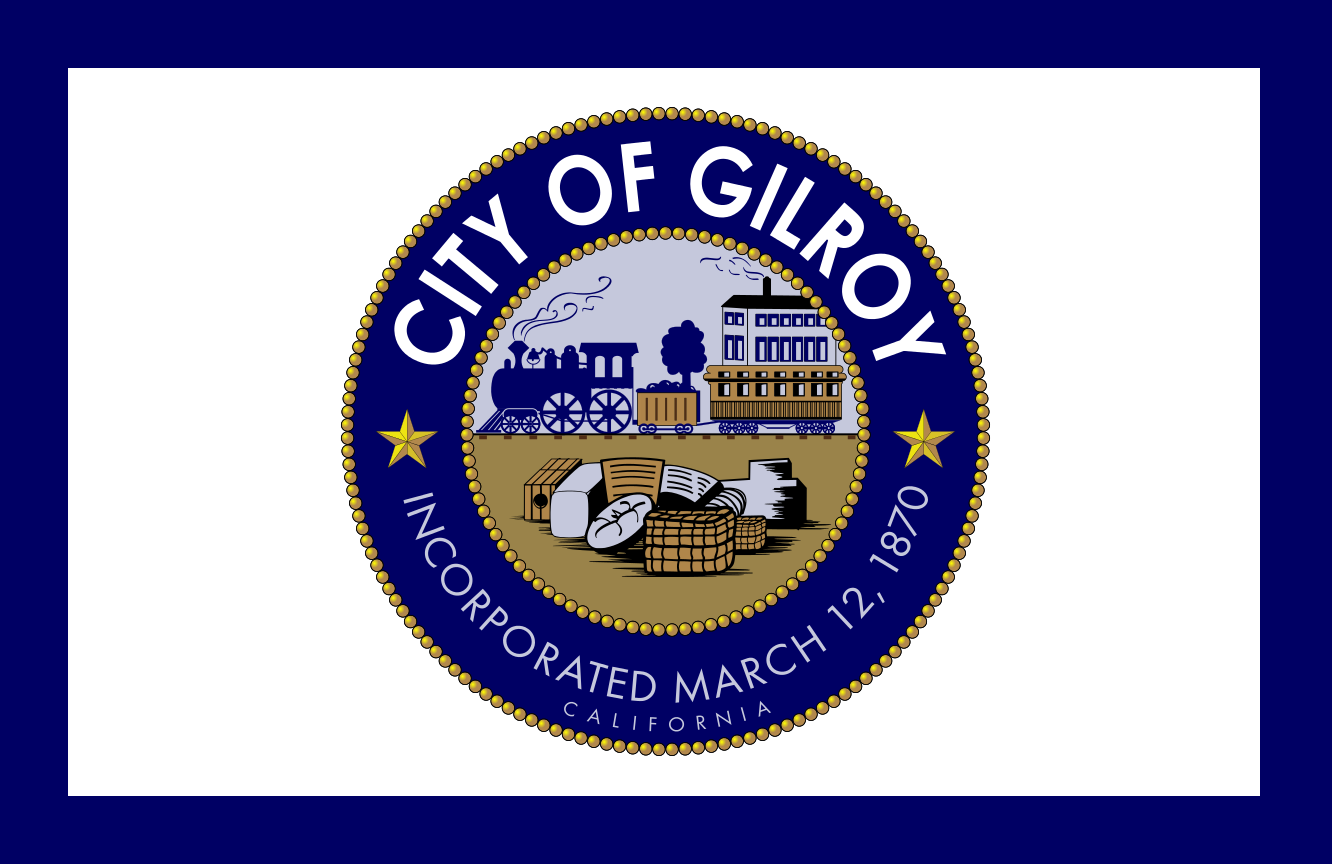
- Flag Seal
- Nickname: "Garlic Capital of the World"
- Interactive map of Gilroy, California
- Location within California Location within the United States
- Coordinates: 37°0′43″N 121°34′48″W
- Country: United States
- State: California
- County: Santa Clara
- CSA: San Jose-San Francisco-Oakland
- Metro: San Jose-Sunnyvale-Santa Clara
- Incorporated: March 12, 1870
- Named for: John Gilroy

Government
  - Mayor: Greg Bozzo
  - City Administrator: Brad Kilger (interim)

Area
  - City: 16.54 sq mi (42.85 km^{2})
  - Land: 16.54 sq mi (42.83 km^{2})
  - Water: 0.012 sq mi (0.03 km^{2}) 0.06%
  - Metro: 2,695 sq mi (6,979 km^{2})
- Elevation: 200 ft (61 m)

Population (2020)
  - City: 59,520
  - Estimate (2024): 60,390
  - Density: 3,599/sq mi (1,390/km^{2})
  - Metro: 1,836,911
  - Metro density: 681.7/sq mi (263.2/km^{2})
- Demonym: Gilroyan
- Time zone: UTC-08:00 (PST)
  - Summer (DST): UTC-07:00 (PDT)
- ZIP Codes: 95020, 95021
- Area code: 408/669
- FIPS code: 06-29504
- GNIS feature IDs: 277523, 2410591
- Website: www.cityofgilroy.org

Gilroy is a city in Santa Clara County, California, United States, south of the San Francisco Bay Area. It had a population of 59,520 as of the 2020 census.

Gilroy's origins lie in the village of San Ysidro, which developed in the early 19th century from Rancho San Ysidro. This land had been granted to Californio ranchero Ygnacio Ortega in 1809. Following Ygnacio's death in 1833, his daughter Clara Ortega de Gilroy and son-in-law John Gilroy inherited the largest portion of the rancho, and began developing the settlement.

When the town was incorporated in 1868, it was renamed in honor of John Gilroy, a Scotsman who had emigrated to California in 1814, naturalized as a Mexican citizen, adopted the Spanish language, and converted to Catholicism. These changes made him eligible to own land in this area of the Spanish Empire. In the process, he took the name Juan Bautista Gilroy.

Gilroy is known for its garlic crop and the Gilroy Garlic Festival, and is nicknamed the "Garlic Capital of the World". It is also known for boutique wine production, as part of the Santa Clara Valley AVA, mostly consisting of family vineyards around the base of the Santa Cruz Mountains to the west.

== History ==
=== Spanish era ===
Spanish explorers led by Juan Bautista de Anza first passed through the Santa Clara Valley area in 1776. More than 20 years later, Spanish missionaries established Mission San Juan Bautista in 1797 near the Pajaro River. In 1809, Ygnacio Ortega was granted the 13,066-acre (5,288 ha) Spanish land concession Rancho San Ysidro.

The village of San Ysidro developed nearby, at the foot of Pacheco Pass which linked the El Camino Real and the Santa Clara Valley with the San Joaquin Valley. California's main exports at this time were hides and tallow, of which thousands of barrels were produced and shipped to the rest of New Spain. Trade and diplomatic intercourse with foreigners was strictly forbidden by the royal government but was quietly carried on by Californians desperate for luxury goods.

=== Mexican era ===
During the War of 1812, the armed merchantman Isaac Todd was sent by the North West Company to seize Fort Astoria, an American trading post at the mouth of the Columbia River. The ship, with a Royal Navy escort, departed from Portsmouth, England, made its way around Cape Horn and proceeded up the Pacific coast of the Americas, stopping at Spanish ports for supplies along the way.

In January 1814, having fallen behind its escort, the Isaac Todd arrived at Monterey, California, the Spanish colonial capital of Alta California. During the visit, ordinary seaman John Gilroy (a Scotsman who had changed his name from John Cameron when he went to sea to avoid recognition) either (depending on the historical source) jumped ship or was left ashore to recover from scurvy.

John Gilroy (1794–1869), also known as Juan Bautista Gilroy, spent the next few years moving around among the missions, pueblos and ranchos, plying his trade as a cooper (barrel maker). At first, by his own account in an 1856 letter to Thomas O. Larkin, Gilroy was one of only two English-speakers resident in Alta California. Eventually, he found his way to Rancho San Ysidro, converted to Roman Catholicism and became the first naturalized English-speaking settler in Alta California. In 1821, the same year Mexico won its independence from Spain, Gilroy married a daughter of his employer, ranchero Ygnacio Ortega. Upon Ygnacio's death in 1833, the rancho was divided among his three children—including Gilroy's wife Maria Clara. In 1867, under U.S. property law, the Rancho San Ysidro (Gilroy) was patented to John Gilroy.

The settlement now known as "Old Gilroy" grew up around Gilroy's rancho complex and, after the end of the Mexican–American War in 1848, Gilroy served as alcalde of the village. It served as a stagecoach station of the Butterfield Overland Mail and other stage lines in the late 19th century.

=== American era ===
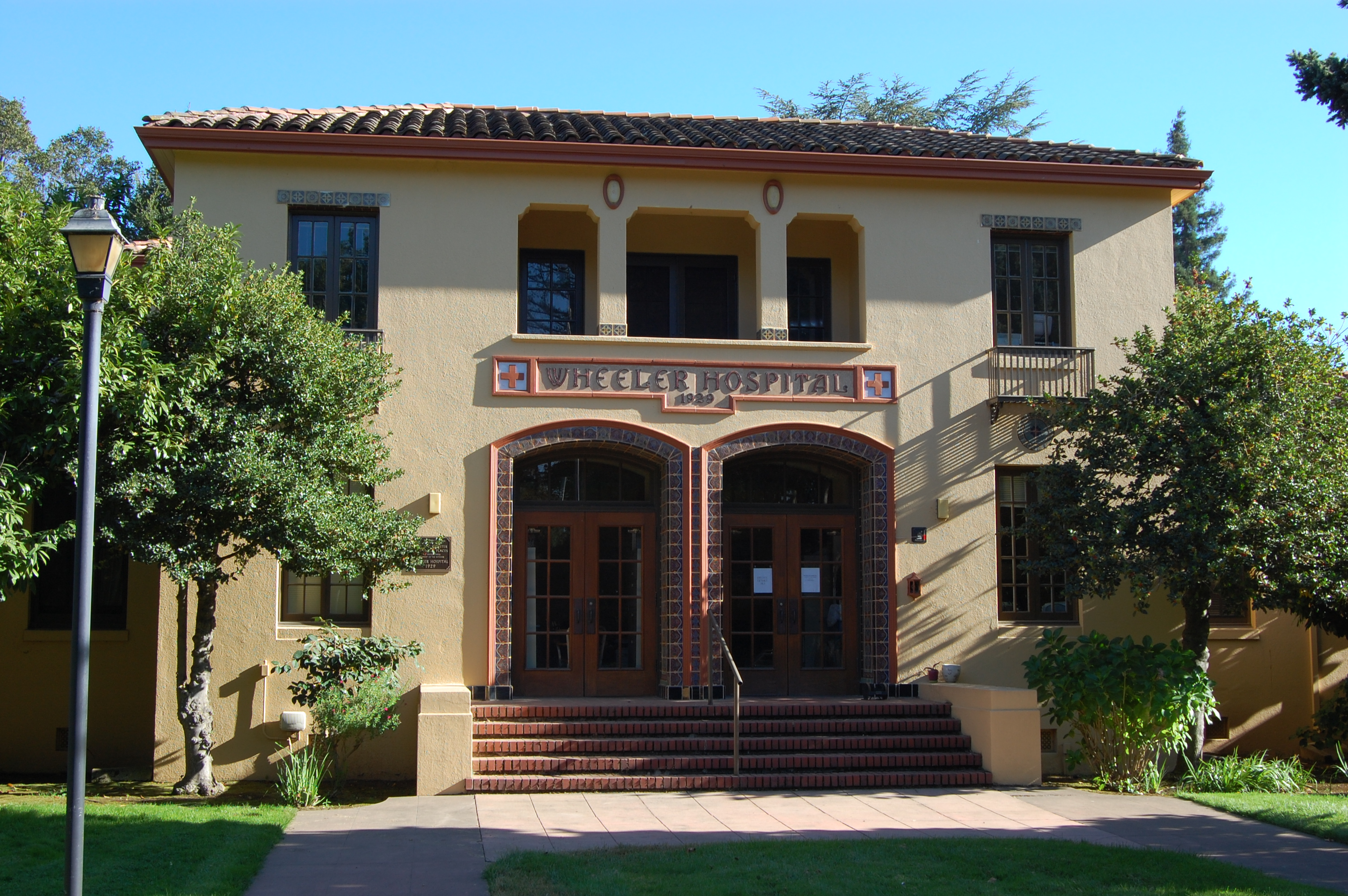
Wheeler Hospital, built 1929 in a Meission Revival style

Following the U.S. Conquest of California and the discovery of gold in the Sierra Nevada in 1848, the trickle of immigrants from the eastern states and abroad became a flood. As many of the earlier Mexican and Californio landowners sold off their land, lost it to squatters, or were dispossessed through title hearings, the area around San Ysidro became known as Pleasant Valley. On March 12, 1870, it was officially incorporated by the state legislature as the town of Gilroy (John Gilroy had died in 1869). By then the town center had been relocated west of the El Camino Real onto land that was formerly part of Rancho Las Animas (Old Gilroy is today a sparsely populated agricultural area).

Cattle ranching and timber from the nearby Santa Cruz Mountains were important to the economy for some time but, as in the rest of the valley, agriculture was the town's greatest source of income. During the 1920s, Kiyoshi "Jimmy" Hirasaki began growing garlic commercially in the Gilroy area. Referred to as the "Garlic King", Hirasaki continued to farm garlic into the 1950s. In 1979, the Gilroy Garlic Festival was launched. Farming remains significant, but in the 1970s the city began evolving into a bedroom community for Silicon Valley to the north.

There are a number of extant historical buildings dating from the mid-19th century. Built in 1857, the Christian Church at 160 Fifth Street is the oldest wood-framed church in continuous use in Santa Clara County. Blacksmith George Eustice's house at 213 Fifth Street was constructed in 1869; Eustice was an American Civil War veteran who fought at Gettysburg. Samuel Moore was a long-time Gilroy postmaster, whose home was built in the 1870s at 7151 Church Street.

Nearby in the foothills of the Diablo Range to the northeast is the historic resort site Gilroy Yamato Hot Springs, first developed in the 1870s (and now closed to the public). In 1905, the Old City Hall was built in downtown Gilroy; in 1975, it was designated on the list of National Register of Historic Places.

=== 2019 Garlic Festival shooting ===
On July 28, 2019, a mass shooting occurred at the 2019 Gilroy Garlic Festival. Three people were killed by the gunman and at least 12 others were injured. The suspect, Santino William Legan, committed suicide after being shot by police.

== Geography ==
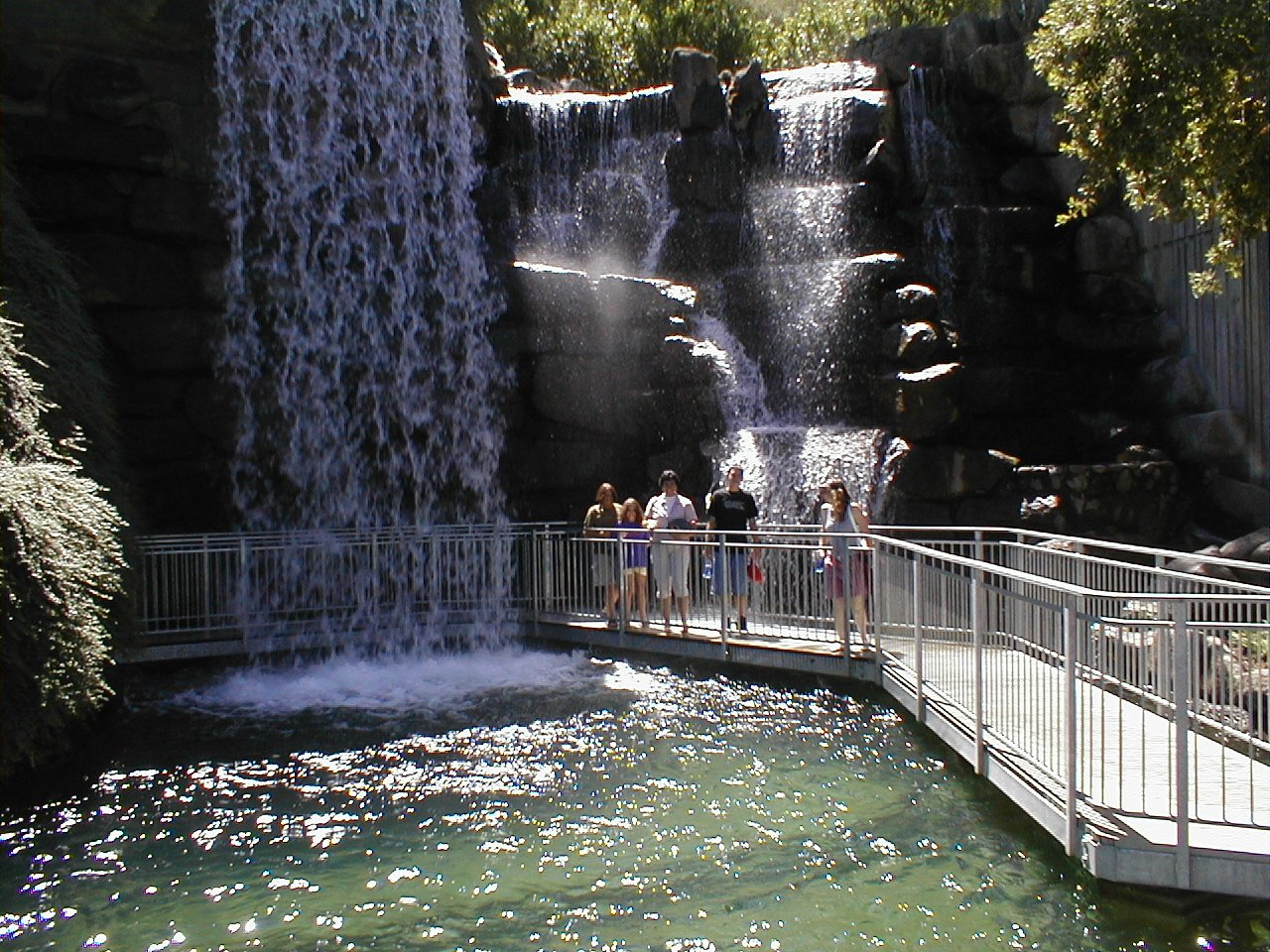
Waterfalls at Gilroy Gardens

According to the United States Census Bureau, the city has a total area of 16.5 square miles (43 km^{2}), of which 0.06% is water.

Primary contributors to environmental noise include U.S. Route 101, Monterey Road, Leavesley Road and other major arterials. The number of people exposed to sound levels above 60 CNEL is approximately 4,000.

=== Climate ===
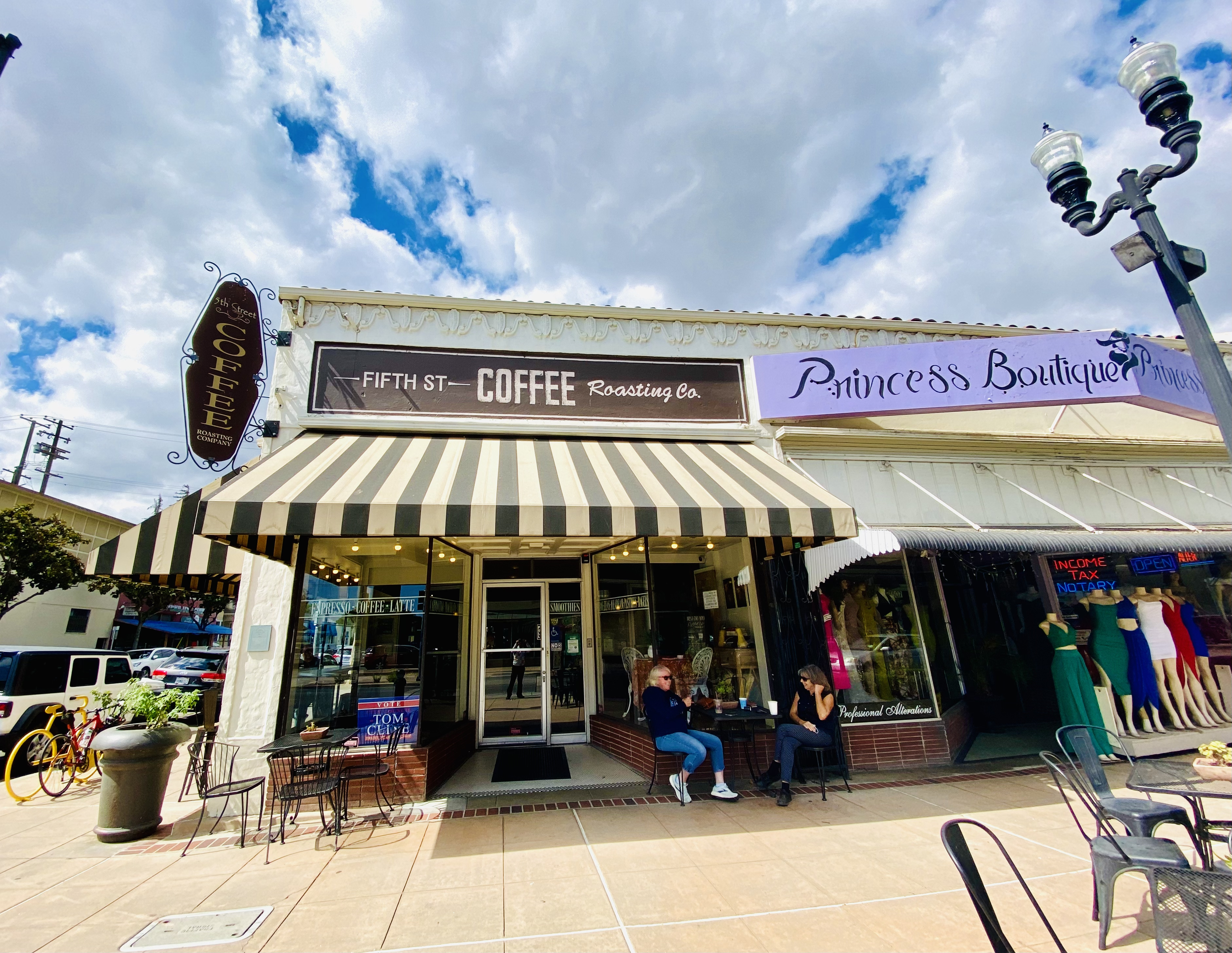
Fifth Street Coffee Shop

Due to the moderating influence of the Pacific Ocean, Gilroy experiences a warm Mediterranean climate (Köppen Csb, bordering on Csa). Temperatures range from an average midsummer maximum of 90.1 °F (32.3 °C) to an average midwinter low of 33.6 °F (0.9 °C). Average annual precipitation is 18.9 inches (480 mm), and the summer months are typically dry. Snowfall is rare; occurring approximately once every 20 years, it is light and short-lived. Summer months are characterized by coastal fog which arrives from the ocean around 10 p.m. and dissipates the next morning by 10 a.m. During summer afternoons, the maritime influence lowers and, as a result, Gilroy is much more prone to heat waves than nearby geographical areas to its north and west. Winter months have many sunny and partly cloudy days, with frequent breaks between rainstorms. The local terrain is not conducive to tornadoes, severe windstorms, or thunderstorms. The local climate supports chaparral and grassland biomes, with stands of live oak at higher elevations.

Average temperatures in December, the coldest month, are a maximum of 60.4 °F (15.8 °C) and a minimum of 37.0 °F (2.8 °C). Average temperatures in August, the hottest month, are a maximum of 87.2 °F (30.7 °C) and a minimum of 54.4 °F (12.4 °C). There are an average of 7.7 days with highs of 100 °F (38 °C) or higher and an average of 16.1 days with lows of 32 °F (0 °C) or lower. The record high temperature of 115 °F (46 °C) occurred on July 15, 1972. The record low temperature of 17 °F (−8 °C) occurred on December 22–24, 1990.

There are an average of 55.0 days with measurable precipitation. The wettest year was 1983 with 37.76 inches (959 mm) and the driest year was 1977 and 2007, both with 11.17 inches (284 mm). The most rainfall in one month was 14.64 inches (372 mm) in January 1914.

Climate data for Gilroy, California (1991–2020 averages, extremes 1957–present)
Month	Jan	Feb	Mar	Apr	May	Jun	Jul	Aug	Sep	Oct	Nov	Dec	Year
Record high °F (°C)	80 (27)	86 (30)	90 (32)	100 (38)	106 (41)	112 (44)	115 (46)	112 (44)	113 (45)	107 (42)	94 (34)	80 (27)	115 (46)
Mean maximum °F (°C)	71.2 (21.8)	76.4 (24.7)	81.9 (27.7)	89.0 (31.7)	94.1 (34.5)	100.1 (37.8)	101.6 (38.7)	102.1 (38.9)	101.0 (38.3)	95.3 (35.2)	82.9 (28.3)	70.5 (21.4)	105.6 (40.9)
Mean daily maximum °F (°C)	60.7 (15.9)	64.0 (17.8)	68.1 (20.1)	71.9 (22.2)	77.3 (25.2)	82.8 (28.2)	87.2 (30.7)	87.2 (30.7)	84.9 (29.4)	78.8 (26.0)	68.3 (20.2)	60.4 (15.8)	74.3 (23.5)
Daily mean °F (°C)	49.4 (9.7)	52.2 (11.2)	55.3 (12.9)	58.2 (14.6)	63.1 (17.3)	67.2 (19.6)	70.6 (21.4)	70.8 (21.6)	68.7 (20.4)	63.4 (17.4)	55.0 (12.8)	48.7 (9.3)	60.2 (15.7)
Mean daily minimum °F (°C)	38.1 (3.4)	40.4 (4.7)	42.6 (5.9)	44.5 (6.9)	49.0 (9.4)	51.6 (10.9)	54.0 (12.2)	54.4 (12.4)	52.5 (11.4)	47.9 (8.8)	41.6 (5.3)	37.0 (2.8)	46.1 (7.8)
Mean minimum °F (°C)	28.4 (−2.0)	32.4 (0.2)	35.0 (1.7)	37.6 (3.1)	42.8 (6.0)	45.7 (7.6)	50.0 (10.0)	49.7 (9.8)	46.0 (7.8)	40.3 (4.6)	32.7 (0.4)	28.2 (−2.1)	26.0 (−3.3)
Record low °F (°C)	18 (−8)	23 (−5)	23 (−5)	27 (−3)	31 (−1)	36 (2)	41 (5)	37 (3)	30 (−1)	29 (−2)	23 (−5)	17 (−8)	17 (−8)
Average precipitation inches (mm)	4.55 (116)	4.27 (108)	2.59 (66)	1.30 (33)	0.56 (14)	0.15 (3.8)	0.00 (0.00)	0.03 (0.76)	0.04 (1.0)	0.85 (22)	1.74 (44)	3.69 (94)	19.77 (502)
Average precipitation days (≥ 0.01 in)	9.8	9.8	7.8	5.1	2.5	0.6	0.3	0.3	0.6	2.8	6.1	9.3	55.0
Source: NOAA

== Demographics ==
Historical population
Census	Pop.	Note	%±
1870	1,625		—
1880	1,621		−0.2%
1890	1,694		4.5%
1900	1,820		7.4%
1910	2,437		33.9%
1920	2,862		17.4%
1930	3,502		22.4%
1940	3,615		3.2%
1950	4,951		37.0%
1960	7,348		48.4%
1970	12,684		72.6%
1980	21,641		70.6%
1990	31,487		45.5%
2000	41,464		31.7%
2010	48,821		17.7%
2020	59,520		21.9%
2024 (est.)	60,390	▲	1.5%
U.S. Decennial Census

=== 2020 census ===
As of the 2020 census, Gilroy had a population of 59,520. The median age was 36.2 years. 26.7% of residents were under the age of 18 and 12.3% of residents were 65 years of age or older. For every 100 females there were 98.2 males, and for every 100 females age 18 and over there were 96.1 males age 18 and over.

98.1% of residents lived in urban areas, while 1.9% lived in rural areas.

There were 17,637 households in Gilroy, of which 46.0% had children under the age of 18 living in them. Of all households, 56.3% were married-couple households, 13.9% were households with a male householder and no spouse or partner present, and 23.3% were households with a female householder and no spouse or partner present. About 14.8% of all households were made up of individuals and 7.3% had someone living alone who was 65 years of age or older.

There were 18,248 housing units, of which 3.3% were vacant. The homeowner vacancy rate was 1.0% and the rental vacancy rate was 3.7%.

Racial composition as of the 2020 census
Race	Number	Percent
White	20,836	35.0%
Black or African American	1,352	2.3%
American Indian and Alaska Native	1,557	2.6%
Asian	6,313	10.6%
Native Hawaiian and Other Pacific Islander	210	0.4%
Some other race	17,644	29.6%
Two or more races	11,608	19.5%
Hispanic or Latino (of any race)	33,650	56.5%

=== 2010 census ===
The 2010 United States census reported that Gilroy had a population of 48,821. The population density was 3,021.7 inhabitants per square mile (1,166.7/km^{2}). The racial makeup of Gilroy was 28,674 (58.7%) White, 942 (1.9%) African American, 831 (1.7%) Native American, 3,448 (7.1%) Asian, 111 (0.2%) Pacific Islander, 12,322 (25.2%) from other races, and 2,493 (5.1%) from two or more races. Hispanic or Latino of any race were 28,214 persons (57.8%).

The Census reported that 48,015 people (98.3% of the population) lived in households, 642 (1.3%) lived in non-institutionalized group quarters, and 164 (0.3%) were institutionalized.

There were 14,175 households, out of which 7,111 (50.2%) had children under the age of 18 living in them, 8,160 (57.6%) were opposite-sex married couples living together, 2,212 (15.6%) had a female householder with no husband present, 964 (6.8%) had a male householder with no wife present. There were 996 (7.0%) unmarried opposite-sex partnerships, and 102 (0.7%) same-sex married couples or partnerships. 2,136 households (15.1%) were made up of individuals, and 908 (6.4%) had someone living alone who was 65 years of age or older. The average household size was 3.39. There were 11,336 families (80.0% of all households); the average family size was 3.69.

The population was spread out, with 14,983 people (30.7%) under the age of 18, 4,514 people (9.2%) aged 18 to 24, 14,104 people (28.9%) aged 25 to 44, 11,122 people (22.8%) aged 45 to 64, and 4,098 people (8.4%) who were 65 years of age or older. The median age was 32.4 years. For every 100 females, there were 98.5 males. For every 100 females age 18 and over, there were 97.1 males.

There were 14,854 housing units at an average density of 919.4 units per square mile (355.0 units/km^{2}), of which 8,624 (60.8%) were owner-occupied, and 5,551 (39.2%) were occupied by renters. The homeowner vacancy rate was 1.7%; the rental vacancy rate was 4.6%. 27,798 people (56.9% of the population) lived in owner-occupied housing units and 20,217 people (41.4%) lived in rental housing units.

=== 2000 census ===
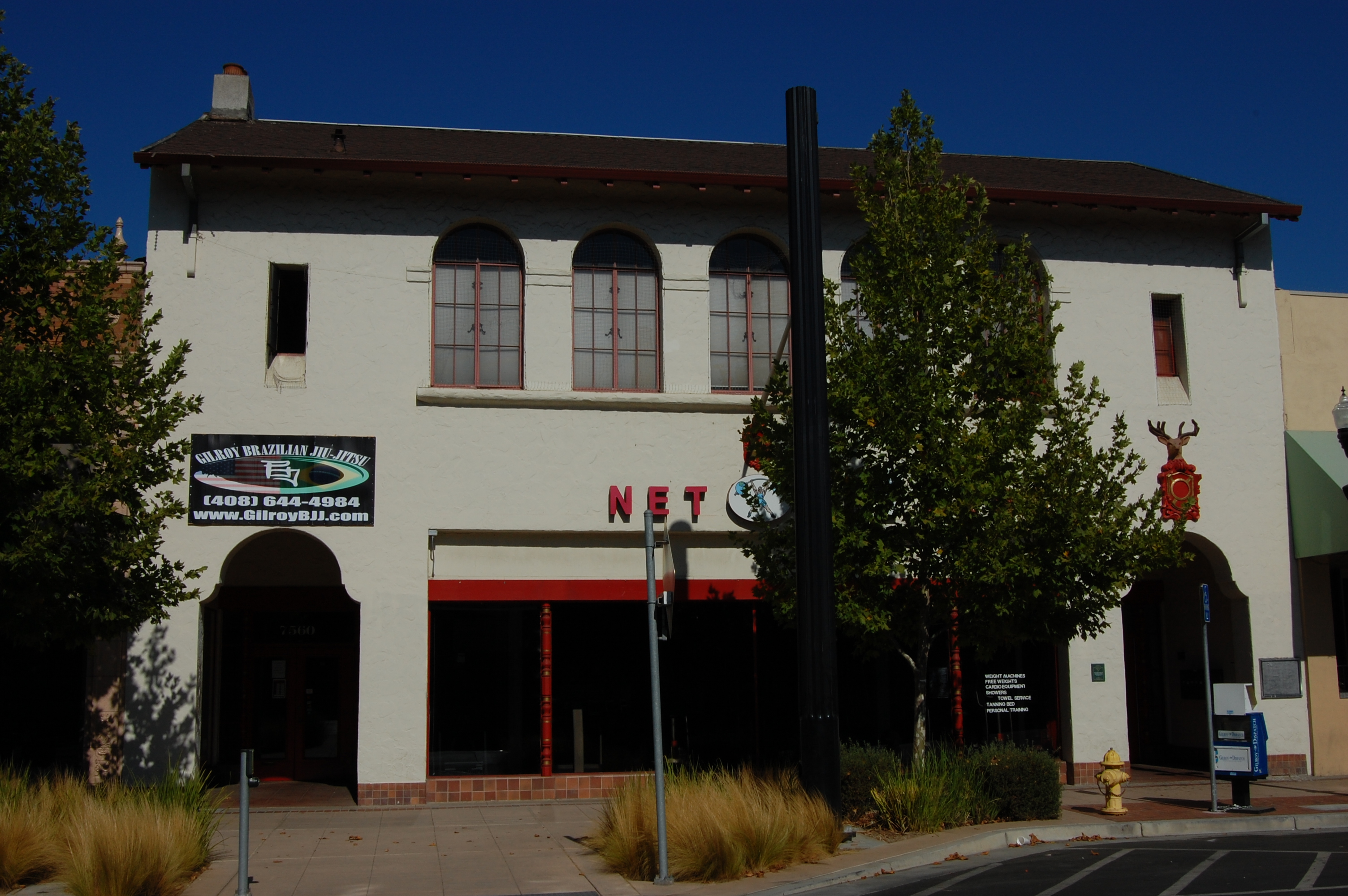
Elks Building, built 1931

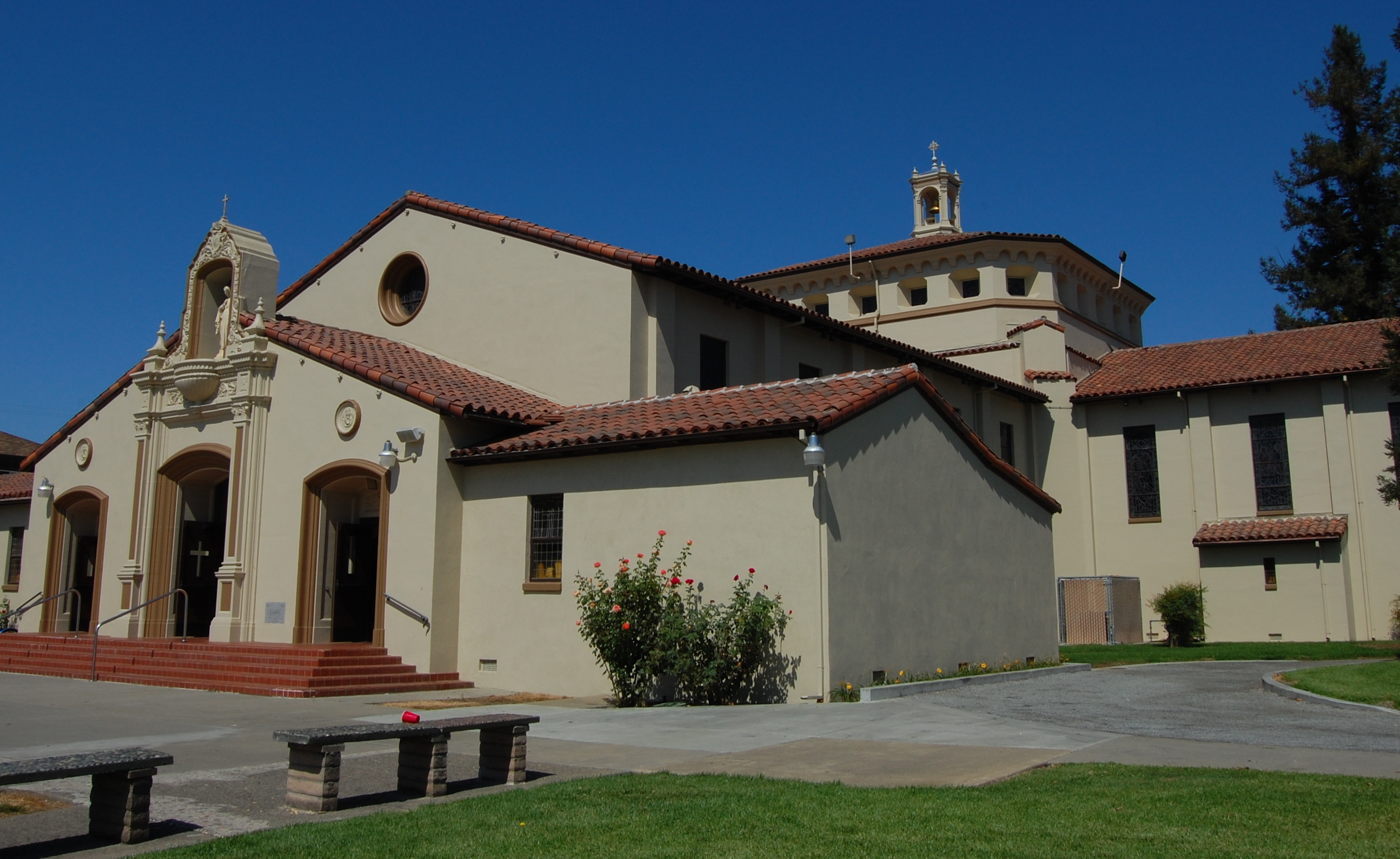
Spanish Colonial Revival style St. Mary Catholic Church

As of the United States 2000 Census, there were 41,464 people, 11,869 households, and 9,590 families residing in the city. The population density was 2,615.2 inhabitants per square mile (1,009.7/km^{2}). There were 12,152 housing units at an average density of 766.5 units per square mile (295.9 units/km^{2}). The racial makeup of the city was 58.9% White, 1.8% African American, 1.6% Native American, 4.4% Asian, 0.3% Pacific Islander, 27.7% from other races, and 5.4% from two or more races. 53.8% of the population were Hispanic or Latino of any race.

There were 11,869 households, out of which 47.7% had children under the age of 18 living with them, 60.8% were married couples living together, 14.2% had a female householder with no husband present, and 19.2% were non-families. 14.3% of all households were made up of individuals, and 5.9% had someone living alone who was 65 years of age or older. The average household size was 3.46 and the average family size was 3.74.

In the city, the population was spread out, with 32.6% under the age of 18, 10.0% from 18 to 24, 32.7% from 25 to 44, 18.0% from 45 to 64, and 6.8% who were 65 years of age or older. The median age was 30 years. For every 100 females, there were 99.3 males. For every 100 females age 18 and over, there were 98.6 males.

The median income for a household in the city was $66,401, and the median income for a family was $80,371. Males had a median income of $45,759 versus $34,710 for females. The per capita income for the city was $22,071. About 7.3% of families and 10.4% of the population were below the poverty line, including 12.8% of those under 18 and 6.5% of those 65 and older.

=== Income and housing estimates ===
The median household income was $116,206, and the per capita income was $41,393. The average cost of a home was $778,300.

== Economy ==
Gilroy, along with Saratoga, San Martin, and Morgan Hill make up the Santa Clara Valley AVA, a designated American Viticultural Area for wineries and vineyards within the historic Santa Clara Valley.

=== Top employers ===
The top five employers in Gilroy are: Gilroy Unified School District, Christopher Ranch LLC, Saint Louise Regional Hospital, Walmart, and Olam International.

== Arts and culture ==
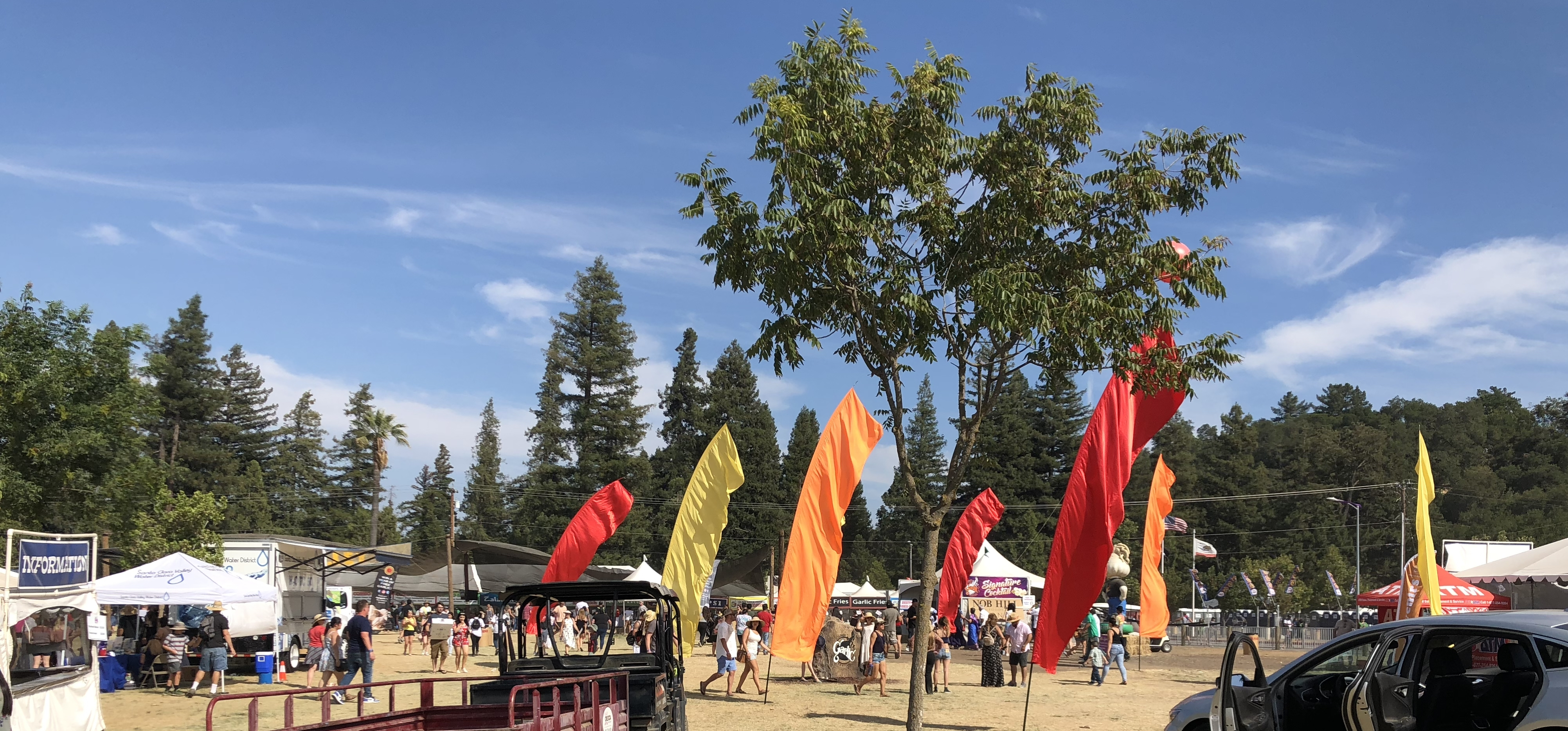
Gilroy Garlic Festival

=== Annual events ===
- Gilroy Garlic Festival (except 2020, 2022, 2023, & 2024)
- Tamal Festival

Gilroy also has over 20 wineries and tasting rooms located along the Santa Clara Valley Wine Trail.

=== Public library ===
Santa Clara County Library District operates the Gilroy Library.

== Parks and recreation ==
- Gilroy Gardens, an amusement park.
- Christmas Hill Park, features a playground, bike trails, and sports fields.
- Gilroy Sports Park, features a playground, sports fields, and bike trails.

== Government ==
In the California State Legislature, Gilroy is in the 15th senatorial district, represented by Democrat Dave Cortese, and in the 29th Assembly district, represented by Democrat Robert Rivas.

In the United States House of Representatives, Gilroy is in California's 18th congressional district, represented by Zoe Lofgren (D–San Jose).

== Education ==
=== Public ===
Gilroy Unified School District operates seven elementary schools, three middle schools, and four high schools located in the city. Gilroy is also home to a community college, Gavilan College.

=== Private ===
- St. Mary's School
- Pacific Point Christian School

=== Charter ===
- Gilroy Prep School

== Media ==
The city is served by the local newspaper Gilroy Dispatch, a weekly newspaper founded in 1868.

CMAP TV is a community accessible television internet channel.

Radio stations include:

- KBAY (94.5 FM), based in Gilroy with its studio in San Jose.
- KAZA (1290 AM).

== Transportation ==
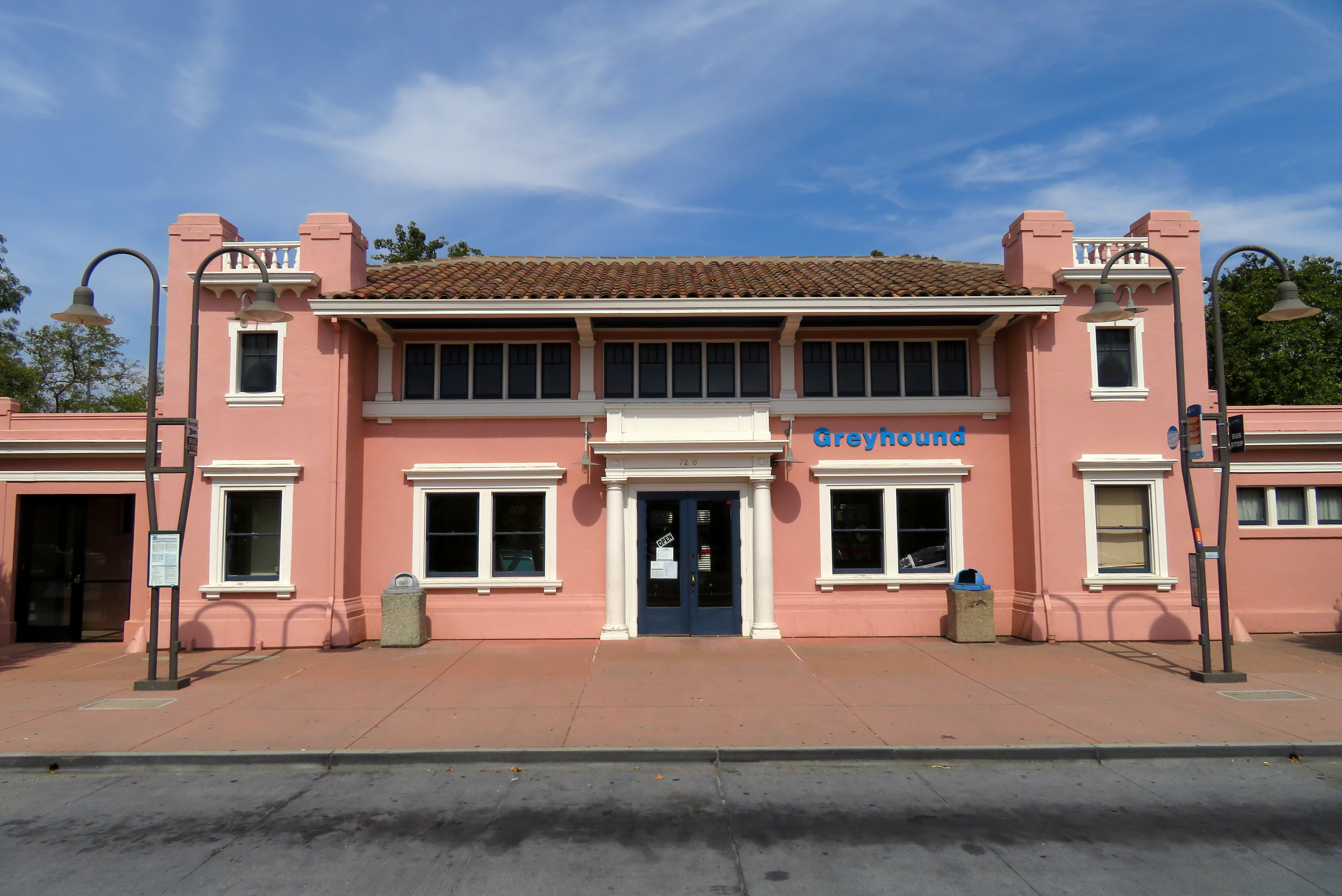
Gilroy station was established in 1869. The current station was built in 1917, and is served today by Caltrain.

=== Airports ===
Small general-aviation aircraft are served by the uncontrolled San Martin Airport (E16), located at San Martin, about six miles north of Gilroy. Commercial flights are served by San Jose International Airport, about 36 mi (58 km) away in San Jose.

=== Highways ===
Gilroy is served by two major highways:

- U.S. Route 101
- State Route 152

=== Public transportation ===
- The Santa Clara Valley Transportation Authority provides local buses and express buses to San Jose and Sunnyvale.
- Gilroy is the southern terminus of Caltrain, which operates four northbound and four southbound rush-hour commute trains each weekday between the Gilroy station and San Jose Diridon station.
- Amtrak California's Capitol Corridor will eventually stop at the Gilroy station as part of the Monterey County Rail Extension.
- Monterey-Salinas Transit's Line 55, which stops in Gilroy, is a rush-hour San Jose–Monterey express bus that also serves as an Amtrak Thruway connection.
- San Benito County Express provides intercounty bus service to Hollister and San Juan Bautista.

== Sister cities ==
Gilroy is twinned with:

- Angra do Heroísmo, Portugal
- Koror, Palau
- Monticelli d'Ongina, Italy
- Saint-Clar, France
- Takko, Japan
- Tecate, Mexico

== Notable people ==
- J. E. Clark (born 1836), State Assemblyman and local leader of the Workingmen's Party of California
- George Washington Kirk (1837–1905), Union Colonel of the Civil War who died in Gilroy
- Enid Michael (1883–1966), American ranger-naturalist
- Gene Hildebrand (1887–1921), US national champion jockey
- Ivie Anderson (1904–1949), jazz singer
- Charles Gubser (1916–2011), United States House of Representatives from California from 1953 to 1974
- John Hudson (1919–1996), U.S. Army Air Forces and actor
- William Hudson (1919–1974), actor
- Kevin A. Gilroy (1936–2013), United States Air Force colonel and mayor of Gilroy (1997–1999)
- Olga Talamante (born 1950), Chicana political activist and political prisoner
- Maryedith Burrell (born 1952), film and television producer
- Jeff Garcia (born 1970), quarterback
- Daniel Cormier (born 1979), mixed martial artist and UFC commentator
- Chris Gimenez (born 1982), professional baseball player
- Robert Guerrero (born 1983), professional boxer
- Jesse Delgado (born 1992), mixed martial artist and folkstyle wrestler
- Dustin Wolf (born 2001), professional hockey player
