= Isle of Wight Garlic Festival =

Coordinates: 50.678°N 1.214°W

The Isle of Wight Garlic Festival is a fundraising event that is held annually on the Isle of Wight to support the island's garlic industry, as well as fundraising for other agricultural farms on the island.

== History ==
The Garlic Festival has been held every year since 1983, except 2020-21 when officials cited the COVID-19 pandemic that caused its cancellation. 2022 saw its resumption. From 1985 to 2006, the Newchurch Parish Sports & Community Association organised the annual Garlic Festival, achieving their major fundraising goals. It has recently drawn 20,000 visitors a year.

Further entertainment has included live music from artists such as The Wurzels, Chas & Dave, Alvin Stardust, the Glitter Band, Chesney Hawkes, Kiki Dee, and Jim Diamond.

== See also ==
- Gilroy Garlic Festival
