= California Garlic Festival =

Annual festival in California, United States

- Status: Ceased
- Genre: Fairs
- Frequency: Annually
- Location: California
- Country: United States
- Years active: 2022–2024
- Website: https://www.cagarlicfestival.com/

The California Garlic Festival was a food festival in California, United States, centered around garlic, that operated from 2022 to 2024 in response to the cancellation of the Gilroy Garlic Festival. The new festival is sometimes considered a successor of the other, although they are organized by two unrelated promoters.

The California Garlic Festival is organized by the Noceti Group, which also organizes the annual Asparagus Festival in Stockton.

The event was held at San Joaquin County Fairgrounds in August 2022 and August 2023, and moved to Los Banos in August 2024. With the revival of the Gilroy Garlic Festival in 2025, the Noceti Group cancelled the event to focus on the Asparagus Festival.
