= Gilroy Garlic Festival =

Food festival in Gilroy, California

- Status: Active
- Genre: Fairs
- Begins: The Friday preceding the last Sunday of July
- Ends: Last Sunday of July
- Frequency: Annually
- Venue: Christmas Hill Park, Gilroy Gardens
- Location: Gilroy, California
- Coordinates: 36°59′52″N 121°35′7″W
- Country: United States
- Years active: 1979–2019, 2021, 2025–present
- Website: Official website

The Gilroy Garlic Festival is a food festival in the United States, initially held annually from 1979 to 2019 at Christmas Hill Park in Gilroy, California, on the last full weekend in July. After its cancellation in 2020 due to the COVID-19 pandemic, a drive-through festival was held on July 23–25, July 30–31, and August 1, 2021. In April 2022, the Gilroy Garlic Festival Association announced the indefinite suspension of the traditional large-format festival, stating that it would instead host smaller individual events. In May 2022, the festival was canceled indefinitely. On March 28, 2025, the Gilroy Garlic Festival Association announced that that the festival would return in 2025, from July 25–27, 2025.

An annual three-day event, the Gilroy Garlic Festival was one of the country's best-known food festivals, drawing visitors from across the nation. Located about 30 miles (48 km) southeast of San Jose, Gilroy is home to about 60,000 people, and the city is a major producer of garlic. The festival was Gilroy's top fundraiser, staffed with volunteers to raise money for nonprofit groups including clubs and schools.

== History ==
The inaugural Garlic Festival was held in 1979. Rudolph J. Malone, then President of Gavilan College in Gilroy, was inspired by a small town in France which hosted an annual garlic festival and claimed to be the "Garlic Capital of the World." Malone started the festival, which attracted hundreds of thousands of paying visitors a year.

=== 2019 shooting ===
On July 28, 2019, a mass shooting occurred at the 41st edition of the festival. Three people were killed, in addition to the gunman, and 17 others were injured.

=== COVID-19 pandemic and cancellation ===
The festival was cancelled in 2020 due to the COVID-19 pandemic, while 2021 saw a drive-thru festival. In April 2022, the Gilroy Garlic Festival Association announced that the event would be canceled thereafter due to prolonged losses, "lingering uncertainties from the pandemic," and "prohibitive insurance requirements by the City of Gilroy" since the 2019 shooting.

=== California Garlic Festival ===
The California Garlic Festival was held annually from 2022 to 2024 in response to the cancellation of the Gilroy Garlic Festival. The California Garlic Festival is sometimes considered a successor of the Gilroy Garlic Festival, although they are held by two unrelated organizers.

=== 2025 revival ===
On March 28, 2025, the Gilroy Garlic Festival Association announced the Garlic Festival would return July 25–27, 2025. The 2025 festival was held at Gilroy Gardens. Since its revival attendance is strictly limited to 3,000 per day, compared to past festivals that had 100,000 attendees.

== In popular culture ==
The Garlic Festival was featured by Huell Howser in Road Trip Episode 124.

The 1980 Les Blank documentary Garlic Is as Good as Ten Mothers features footage filmed at the Gilroy Garlic Festival.

== Gallery ==
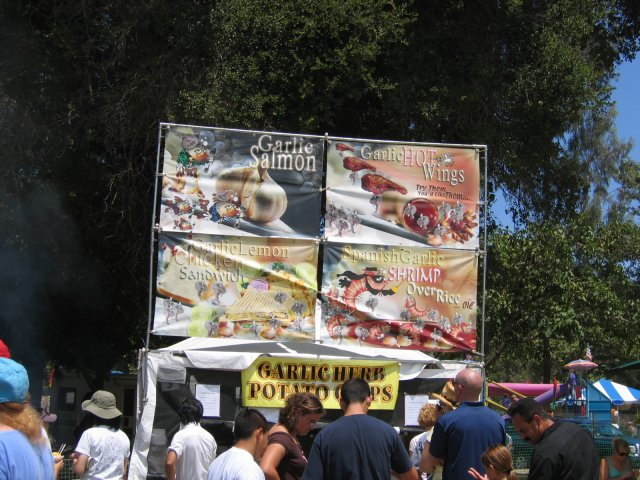
Garlic food varieties, 2006

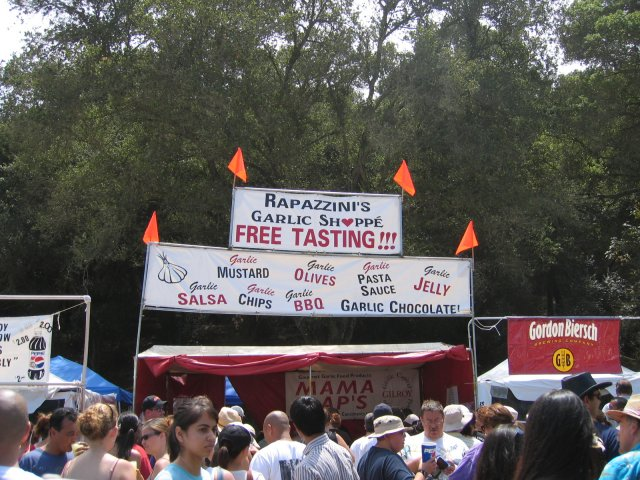
Garlic food choices, 2006

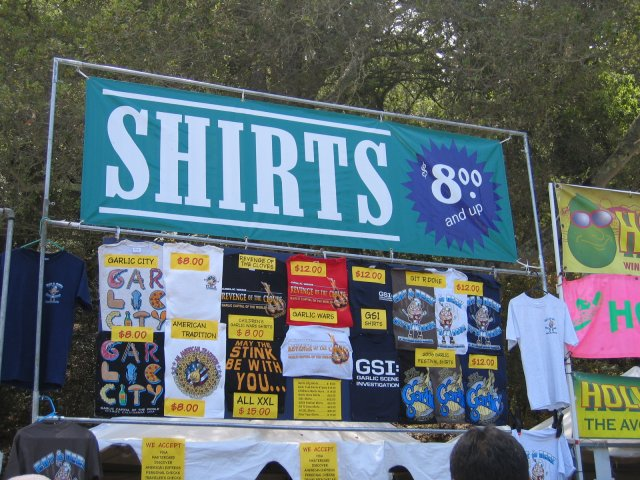
Garlic themed t-shirts, 2006

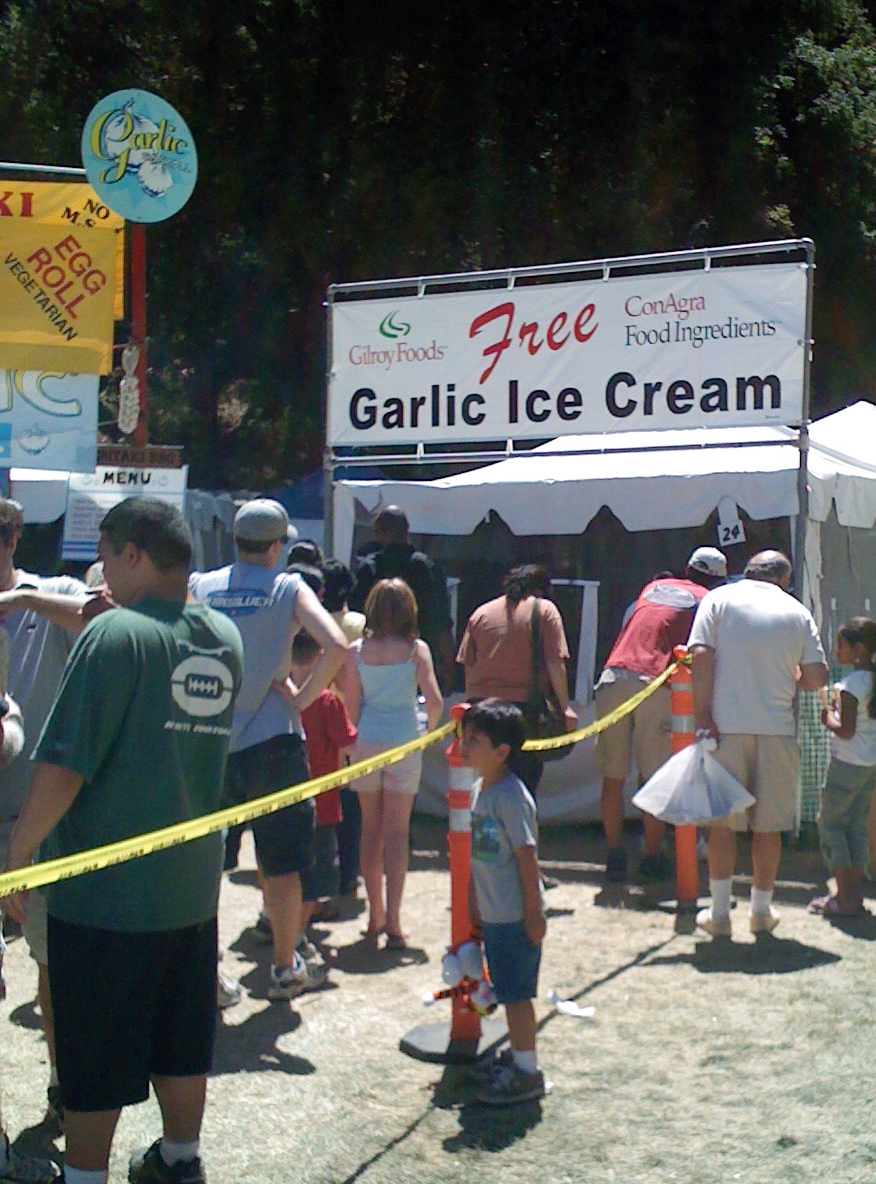
Visitors tasting free samples of garlic ice cream, 2007

Calamari being cooked, 2011

== See also ==
- Isle of Wight Garlic Festival
- Garlic ice cream

== Sources ==
- Gilroy Garlic Festival. Retrieved January 19, 2007.
- The Gilroy Garlic Festival, 2005.
- Garlic festival tidbits, 2006.
- The Origin of the Gilroy Garlic Festival, 2007.
