= Brownell Middle School =

Brownell Middle School may refer to:

- Brownell Middle School, a public secondary school in the Gilroy Unified School District in Gilroy, California
- Brownell Middle School, a public secondary school in the Grosse Pointe Public School System in Grosse Pointe Farms, Michigan
