= Sonic Liberation Front Meets Sunny Murray =

Studio album by Sonic Liberation Front and Sunny Murray
- Released: 2010
- Recorded: 2002 and 2008
- Studio: Rittenhouse Recording, Philadelphia
- Genre: Free jazz
- Label: High Two; HT027

Sunny Murray chronology
The Gearbox Explodes! (2008)	Sonic Liberation Front Meets Sunny Murray (2010)	I Stepped Onto a Bee (2011)

Sonic Liberation Front Meets Sunny Murray is an album by the Philadelphia-based ensemble Sonic Liberation Front and drummer Sunny Murray. Three tracks on the album were recorded live in 2002, while the remaining tracks were recorded at Rittenhouse Recording Studio in 2008. The album was released in 2010 by the High Two label.

== Reception ==
Professional ratings
Review scores
Source	Rating
AllMusic	4/5 stars
All About Jazz #1	3.5/5 stars
All About Jazz #2	3/5 stars
DownBeat	3/5 stars

In a review for AllMusic, Phil Freeman wrote: "Though he's one of the most powerful drummers in jazz, free or otherwise, Murray never truly takes over the music; he's a guest in this house, and he acts accordingly, supporting the group rather than turning its compositions into platforms for drum solos." He stated that the music reinforces the idea "that so-called 'free' jazz has rules every bit as strict as those governing bebop or big-band swing."

DownBeat reviewer Bill Meyer praised "Knowledge of the Sun," writing: "cornetist Todd Margasak and saxophonist Terry Lawson's mournful unisons seem to drift over the slowly undulating percussive figures like a rain cloud over an arboreal canopy." However, he noted: "this CD represents neither party at its best."

Writing for All About Jazz, Mark Corroto suggested that "the purpose here is the pulse and consciousness-raising properties of the vibrations emitted," and commented: "Perhaps we could call them a West African/Cuban/AACM jam band that's the child of Albert Ayler and Sun Ra."

== Track listing ==
1. "Init" (Kevin Diehl) – 9:20
2. "Knowledge of the Sun" (Matt Engle) – 7:26
3. "Meaningless Kisses" (Sunny Murray) – 10:32
4. "Cosa de Grupo" (Kevin Diehl) – 5:45
5. "Ochun Libre" (Kevin Diehl) – 9:47
6. "Some Other Times" (Sunny Murray) – 11:50
7. "Nomingo" (Sunny Murray) – 9:59
8. "Under the Waves of Kanagawa" (Adam Jenkins) – 5:40
- Tracks 1–5 recorded in June, 2008, at Rittenhouse Recording in Philadelphia. Tracks 6–8 recorded live in 2002.

== Personnel ==
- Sunny Murray – drums
- Adam Jenkins – alto saxophone (tracks 6–8)
- Terry Lawson – tenor saxophone
- Kimbal Brown – trumpet (tracks 6–8)
- Todd Margasak – cornet (tracks 1–5)
- Matt Engle – bass (tracks 1–5)
- Fahir Kendall – bass (tracks 6–8)
- Kevin Diehl – drums, percussion, bata
- Chuck Joseph – bata, congas
- Okomfo Adwoa Tacheampong – bata (tracks 1–5)
- Shawn Hennessy – bata (tracks 1–5)
- Nichola Rivera – bata, congas (tracks 6–8)
- Joey Toledo – bata, percussion (tracks 6–8)
