= Christopher High School =

Location
- 850 Day Road; Gilroy, California; United States; 37°2′14.49″N 121°36′6.1″W

Information
- Type: Public
- Established: 2009
- School district: Gilroy Unified School District
- NCES District ID: 0615180
- Superintendent: Anisha Munshi
- NCES School ID: 061518012264
- Principal: Jeremy Dirks
- Assistant principals: Kay Guenther; Mark Pierce
- Staff: 71.60 (FTE)
- Grades: 9–12
- Enrollment: 1,667 (2023–2024)
- Student to teacher ratio: 23.28
- Colors: Gold, Teal, Black, White
- Athletics: Interscholastic Sports
- Mascot: Cougar
- Rivals: Hollister High School; Gilroy High School
- Website: chs.gilroyunified.org

Christopher High School is a co-educational public school in Gilroy, California. It is one of two public comprehensive high schools in the city and has an approximate enrollment of 1,700 students. It is a part of the Gilroy Unified School District.

== History ==
The school is named for the Christopher family, owner of the Christopher Ranch, a local garlic farm that is one of the largest employers in Gilroy. Don Christopher donated 10 acres of land and started an endowment for the school with an initial investment of $75,000. The school was first proposed because Gilroy High was close to reaching its maximum capacity. It was approved in 2005 by the Gilroy Unified School District board and opened in August 2009.

== Athletics ==
Autumn	Winter	Spring
Girls Golf	Soccer	Boys Golf
Girls Tennis	Basketball	Boys Tennis
Cross Country	Wrestling	Boys Volleyball
Field Hockey		Swimming & Diving
Girls Volleyball		Baseball
Water Polo		Gymnastics
		Lacrosse
		Softball
		Track & Field
		Badminton

== See also ==
- Gilroy Unified School District
