= Debbie Klein =

American anthropologist and author

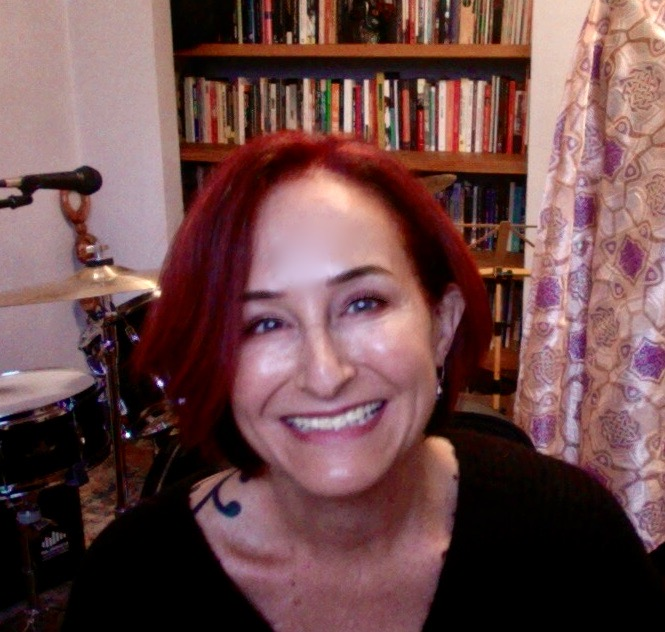
Professor Debbie Klein

Debbie (Debra Lynn) Klein (born 11 December 1970) is an American anthropologist and author. She is a professor in the Anthropology Department at Gavilan College. Klein has conducted extensive collaborative research in Nigeria with Yorùbá performing artists. Recognizing Klein's decades of collaborative written and video documentation of Yorùbá culture, the town of Èrìn-Òșùn, Nigeria bestowed an honorary chieftaincy title, Iyalode of Èrìn-Òșùn, upon Klein alongside her long-term collaborator, Chief Làmídì Àyánkúnlé. Throughout her career, Klein has advocated at local, state, national, and international levels for increased investment in public education as a means to achieve social and economic justice.

== Education ==
Klein received her B.A. from Brown University and completed her M.A. and Ph.D. in anthropology at the University of California, Santa Cruz. In Nigeria, Klein studied as an undergraduate at the University of Ibadan and returned to the University of Ibadan as a doctoral student and Fulbright scholar affiliated with the Department of Archaeology and Anthropology.

== Teaching and research ==
Upon receiving her doctoral degree, she served as a postdoctoral research fellow at the University of California, Davis and visiting assistant professor at Vassar College. In 2005, she joined Gavilan College. She has contributed and written many articles and an ethnography on a range of anthropological subjects within African studies, performance studies, and ethnomusicology. She has created numerous video shorts documenting Yorùbá performance genres.

== Notable works ==
Some of Klein's notable works include:

Yorùbá Bàtá Goes Global: Artists, Culture Brokers, and Fans (2007)

Klein's first ethnographic work, funded by the Fulbright and Wenner-Gren Foundations, documents how practitioners of bàtá—a centuries-old drumming, dancing, and singing tradition—have recast themselves as traditional performers in a global market. This book delves into the lives of Yorùbá musicians, focusing on their strategic collaborations with artists, culture brokers, researchers, and entrepreneurs worldwide. This book contributes to the field of global studies and analyzes the inequitable power dynamics characterizing transnational collaborations in the world music market.

A Political Economy of Lifestyle and Aesthetics - Yorùbá Artists Produce and Transform Popular Culture (2012)

This article pays tribute to the work of Karin Barber by analyzing the political and economic conditions of Yorùbá culture production, illustrating how the aesthetics of Yorùbá popular culture emerge from Yorùbá artists' creative innovations contextualized within the material and cultural conditions of their everyday lives. Filmic portrayals of Yorùbá traditional performance and culture often produce an aesthetics of nostalgia, a longing for a mythic past disconnected from the everyday lives and creativity of artists whose lives and work are being portrayed. The paper analyzes Klein's original ethnographic data from Yorùbá singing, dancing, drumming, and masquerade performances and a Yorùbá film by Tunde Kelani to illustrate the interconnections between everyday life and aesthetic production.

Fújì - Indigenous and Islamic Popular Music Fusions in Nigeria (2019)

This article draws upon original ethnographic research, sponsored by the National Endowment for the Humanities, and documents the musical genre of fújì, a fusion of an Islamic-influenced vocal style, Yorùbá praise poetry (oríkì), and driving percussion. Fújì's popularity hit a peak in Nigeria and on the global stage in the late 1980s and early 1990s, and fújì bands continue to record their music and perform throughout Nigeria and across the globe into the twenty-first century. During the course of her research, Klein was hosted by the Department of Performing Arts at the University of Ilorin as a visiting research scholar.

Allow Peace to Reign: Musical Genres of Fújì and Islamic Allegorise Nigerian Unity in the Era of Boko Haram (2020)

This article argues that the genres of fújì and Islamic allegorise Nigerian unity—an ideology of tolerance, peaceful coexistence, and equity—while exposing the gap between the aspiration for unity and everyday inequities shaped by gender and morality. The article is based on interviews and performances in Ìlọrin during the 2010s.

Yorùbá Performance Videos

Klein's video shorts provide documentation of a range of Yorùbá performance genres and events. With the assistance of research collaborators, Rasheed Ayandele, Rafiu Ayantayo, and Jeleel Ojuade, Klein has recorded, edited, and produced these videos as forms of cultural documentation.

How the California Community Colleges Disappeared Over a Million Community College Students (2024)

This groundbreaking article argues that edu-philanthropist foundations have created decades of policy designed to shrink and disinvest from California's community colleges. The article is based on Klein's research and leadership experience within local and statewide faculty organizations, including participation in California state governance and legislative processes. Klein calls for the formation of a coalition that will educate the public about the 50-plus-year neoliberal project to defund public education; expose the philanthrocapitalist takeover of community colleges; and advocate for reinvestment in the millions of students who need the community colleges the most.

One Faculty, One Mission: A Unified Faculty Model for California Community Colleges (2026)

Published in the Journal of Collective Bargaining in the Academy, this article advocates for a unified, non-tiered faculty model to fulfill the California Community Colleges' mission of open access and educational equity. Klein argues that with nearly 70% of CCC faculty in contingent roles — often lacking proportional compensation or governance participation — structural inequities undermine student success. Drawing on collective bargaining agreements and comparative institutional models, the article presents a phased implementation roadmap, situating the proposal within national "One Faculty" efforts and California's legislative movement toward pay parity.

== Racial, Economic, and Gender Justice Advocacy ==
Getting involved in anti-apartheid and women's rights movements in the 1980s and 90s, Klein learned the tools and power of activism and advocacy. Her advocacy for public education and educators began with her work as an organizer within her graduate student and faculty unions. She went on to serve as president of the faculty union and senate of Gavilan College. She has advocated for part-time faculty equity, a unified (one-tiered) faculty model, and served on the Diversity, Equity, and Inclusion Task Force of the California Community Colleges, which worked to transform the California Community Colleges into a more equitable system for its students and employees. Klein served as president of the statewide Faculty Association of California Community Colleges, during which she advocated for increased investment in public education as a means for the residents of California to achieve economic and social justice.
