= Randy Spendlove =

American music executive

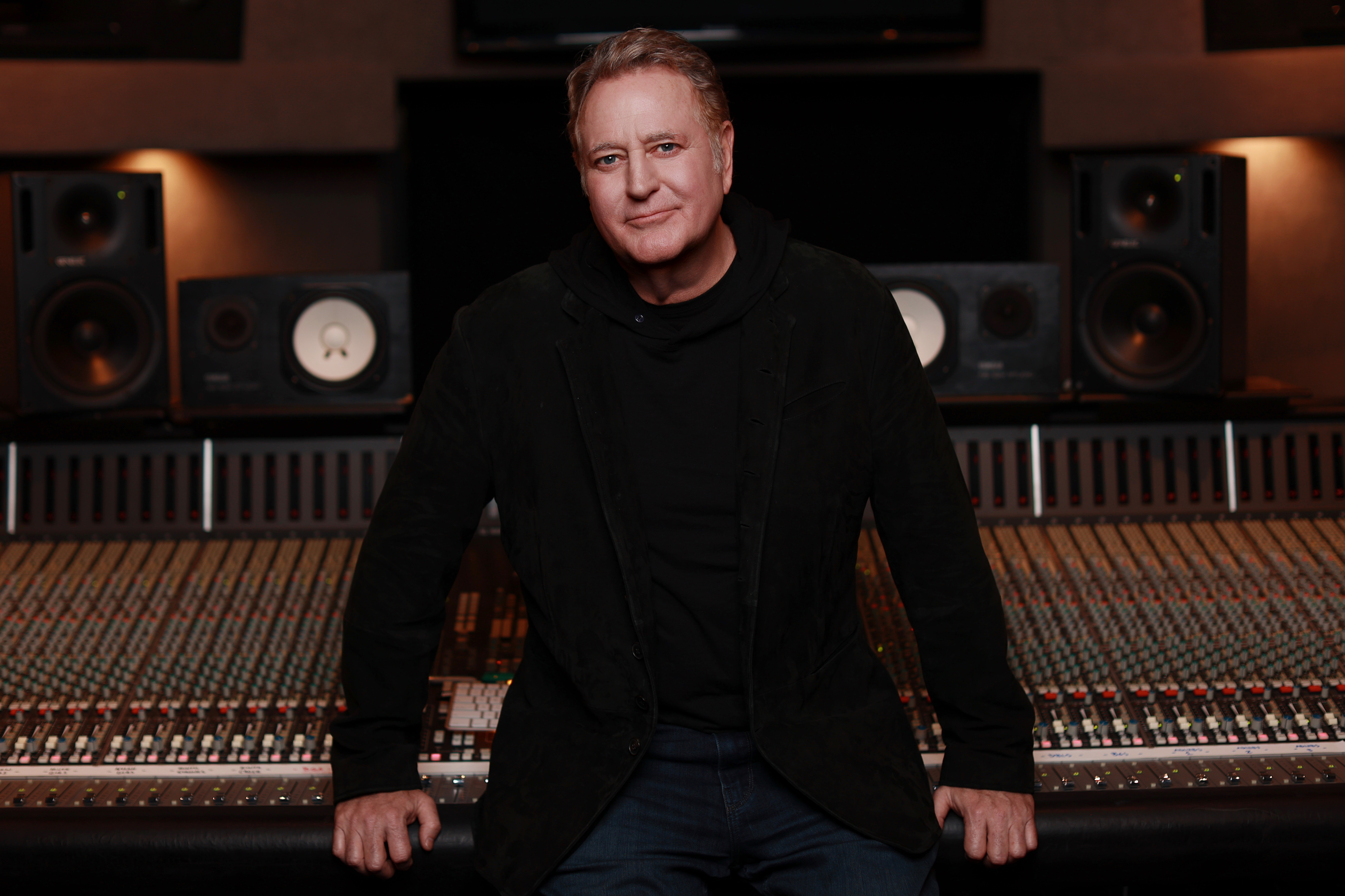
- Randy Spendlove
- Born: Gilroy, California, U.S.
- Education: Gilroy High School (1982)
- Occupations: Music Executive, Record Producer, Songwriter
- Known for: President of Worldwide Music & Publishing, Paramount Pictures
- Awards: Grammy Award (2004, 2025)

Randy Spendlove is a multi Grammy Award-winning music executive, record producer, and songwriter who served as President, Worldwide Music and Publishing at Paramount Pictures for over 20 years. Spendlove is widely regarded as one of the most prolific and influential architects of motion picture music in modern entertainment history, having overseen the music for over 450 major motion pictures.

From Oscar-winning musicals to billion-dollar global franchises, Spendlove's credits include Chicago, Dreamgirls, and Top Gun: Maverick, alongside Rocketman, Bob Marley: One Love, Justin Bieber: Never Say Never, Gangs of New York, The Aviator, the Scream franchise, Shakespeare in Love, Iron Man, and Good Will Hunting — a portfolio that reflects unmatched range across prestige cinema and cultural landmarks.

Spendlove has also worked with world-renowned music artists including Beyoncé, U2, Sting, Sheryl Crow, Rihanna, Linkin Park, Soundgarden, Janet Jackson, Lady Gaga, and many more, further solidifying his influence at the intersection of global artistry and motion picture music.

== Early life ==
Randy Spendlove was born and raised in Gilroy, California. From an early age, he was drawn to music, teaching himself guitar and piano as a child and performing in local rock bands throughout high school. He graduated from Gilroy High School in 1982.

Playing professionally from the age of fifteen or sixteen, Spendlove regularly performed in venues he was not yet old enough to legally enter. He pursued music full-time as a touring musician through his early twenties, honing skills not only in performance but in the logistics and promotion of live events across California. This period gave him a deep, ground-level understanding of the music industry that would later inform his executive work.

By his mid-twenties, Spendlove recognized a shift in both his ambitions and the broader record industry landscape. He made a deliberate decision to move from performing to the business side of music. A pivotal introduction to Charlie Minor — a legendary record industry executive — led directly to his first industry role at A&M Records.

== Career ==
=== A&M Records (1990–1998) ===
In 1990, Spendlove joined A&M Records as Vice President of Promotions, starting in the San Francisco regional office. His responsibilities centered on promoting records to radio stations and serving as a regional liaison for artists on the label. Over eight years at A&M, he rose to national prominence and worked with some of the most commercially and critically significant artists of the era, including:

- Janet Jackson — including the landmark Janet. album (1993)
- Sheryl Crow — including her breakthrough debut Tuesday Night Music Club (1993)
- Soundgarden — during their commercial peak in the early-to-mid 1990s
- Bryan Adams — promotional campaigns across multiple album cycles
- Sting — international promotional strategy
- U2 — select regional and national promotions

Spendlove's tenure at A&M spanned the label's final years as an independent powerhouse before its acquisition by PolyGram (and later Universal Music Group). Recognizing the disruption of digital downloading and declining CD sales, he made the decision to pivot toward film music.

=== Miramax Films (1998–2005) ===
In 1998, Spendlove transitioned to the film industry, joining Miramax Films as Senior Vice President of Motion Picture Music, subsequently promoted to President of Motion Picture Music. He oversaw music for both Miramax and its Dimension Films genre label.

His time at Miramax coincided with a golden era for the studio. Key projects included:

Film	Year	Composer / Key Music	Notes
Shakespeare in Love	1998	Stephen Warbeck	Period-inspired score; Academy Award, Best Picture
Boys and Girls	2000	Stewart Copeland	Dimension Films
Chicago	2002	John Kander / various	Grammy Award – Best Compilation Soundtrack, 2004; Academy Award, Best Picture
Cold Mountain	2003	Gabriel Yared / T Bone Burnett	Jack White, Elvis Costello contributions
Finding Neverland	2004	Jan A.P. Kaczmarek	Academy Award nomination, Best Original Score

The Chicago soundtrack was a landmark achievement — Spendlove co-produced the album, which won the Grammy Award for Best Compilation Soundtrack for Visual Media at the 46th Grammy Awards in 2004.

=== Paramount Pictures (2006–2025) ===
In 2006, Randy Spendlove joined Paramount Pictures as Executive Vice President of Music and Creative Affairs. The following year, he was promoted to President of Motion Picture Music, with his title later expanded to President of Worldwide Music and Publishing. Over nearly two decades, he oversaw music for the studio's entire theatrical slate — typically managing 12–15 active projects simultaneously — encompassing composer hiring, song licensing, original song development, artist partnerships, music publishing strategy, and soundtrack album production.

Spendlove departed Paramount in 2025 as part of a broader restructuring under new studio leadership following Skydance Media's acquisition.

==== Notable Projects at Paramount (2006–2025) ====
Film	Year	Key Music / Artists	Notes
Dreamgirls	2006	Henry Krieger; Beyoncé, Jennifer Hudson, Jamie Foxx	3 Oscar nominations, Best Original Song; co-supervised & co-produced soundtrack
Star Trek	2009	Michael Giacchino	Executive in Charge of Music
Transformers: Revenge of the Fallen	2009	Steve Jablonsky; Linkin Park	Artist partnership model
The Adventures of Tintin	2011	John Williams	Academy Award nomination – Best Original Score
Hugo	2011	Howard Shore	Academy Award nomination – Best Original Score
Justin Bieber: Never Say Never	2011	Various	$73 million US box office; highest-grossing concert film at release
Transformers: Dark of the Moon	2011	Steve Jablonsky; Linkin Park	Continued Linkin Park partnership
Star Trek Into Darkness	2013	Michael Giacchino	Franchise continuation
Transformers: Age of Extinction	2014	Steve Jablonsky; Imagine Dragons ("Battle Cry")	Imagine Dragons partnership
Selma	2014	Jason Moran; John Legend & Common ("Glory")	Academy Award WIN – Best Original Song; Golden Globe WIN – Best Original Song
The SpongeBob Movie: Sponge Out of Water	2015	Pharrell Williams songs	Original songs created with Pharrell
Mission: Impossible – Rogue Nation	2015	Joe Kraemer	Franchise installment
Star Trek Beyond	2016	Michael Giacchino; Rihanna ("Sledgehammer")	Original song partnership
Transformers: The Last Knight	2017	Steve Jablonsky	Series continuation
Mission: Impossible – Fallout	2018	Lorne Balfe	Global premiere attended with director Christopher McQuarrie
A Quiet Place	2018	Marco Beltrami	Critical hit; near-silent approach to film music
Bohemian Rhapsody	2018	Queen / various	Queen biopic; music clearances and production
Rocketman	2019	Elton John / various	Elton John biopic; original musical arrangements
A Quiet Place Part II	2021	Marco Beltrami	Franchise continuation
Top Gun: Maverick	2022	Harold Faltermeyer, Hans Zimmer & Lorne Balfe; Lady Gaga ("Hold My Hand")	Academy Award nomination – Best Original Song
Mission: Impossible – Dead Reckoning Part One	2023	Lorne Balfe	One of Spendlove's final major projects at Paramount
Bob Marley: One Love	2024	Bob Marley catalog; Ziggy Marley & Stephen Marley	Grammy Award WIN – Best Reggae Album (2025); $180M worldwide box office

== Professional Philosophy ==
Spendlove has consistently articulated a dual-track philosophy toward film music: approaching every project from both a "score" perspective (orchestral and compositional underscore) and a "song" perspective (commercial songs that drive narrative moments, promotional campaigns, and ancillary revenue).

A signature of his approach — particularly at Paramount — was the strategic deployment of major recording artists as full creative partners in blockbuster franchises. Rather than licensing existing songs, Spendlove cultivated relationships in which bands like Linkin Park and Imagine Dragons wrote original material specifically for the Transformers films, participated in the scoring process, and became integral to the marketing campaign — creating what he described as "events" around movies.

== Awards and Recognition ==
Award	Year	Project / Category	Organization
Grammy Award – Best Compilation Soundtrack, Motion Picture	2004	Chicago	Recording Academy
Grammy Award – Best Reggae Album	2025	Bob Marley: One Love – Music Inspired By The Film	Recording Academy
Academy Award nomination (project) – Best Original Song	2007	Dreamgirls (three nominations: "Listen," "Love You I Do," "Patience")	Academy of Motion Picture Arts and Sciences
Academy Award WIN (project) – Best Original Song	2015	Selma ("Glory" – John Legend & Common)	Academy of Motion Picture Arts and Sciences
Academy Award nomination (project) – Best Original Score	2012	Hugo (Howard Shore)	Academy of Motion Picture Arts and Sciences
Academy Award nomination (project) – Best Original Score	2012	The Adventures of Tintin (John Williams)	Academy of Motion Picture Arts and Sciences
Academy Award nomination (project) – Best Original Song	2023	Top Gun: Maverick ("Hold My Hand" – Lady Gaga)	Academy of Motion Picture Arts and Sciences
Golden Globe Award WIN (project) – Best Original Song	2015	Selma ("Glory")	Hollywood Foreign Press Association
Billboard Power 100 – #69	2012	Career recognition as Paramount music chief	Billboard
T.J. Martell Foundation Humanitarian Award	2011	Support of leukemia, cancer & AIDS research	T.J. Martell Foundation
Joseph Papp Racial Harmony Award	2007	Promoting diversity through professional contributions	Foundation for Ethnic Understanding

== Board Memberships, Mentorship & Philanthropy ==
=== Recording Academy ===
Spendlove is a member of the Board of Governors — and the National Board of Trustees — of the Recording Academy, the organization that presents the Grammy Awards. In this capacity, he has advocated for music creators, industry standards, and the role of music in film and visual media.

=== Society of Young Composers ===
Spendlove serves on the board of the Society of Young Composers, an organization dedicated to nurturing emerging compositional talent in film, television, and media.

=== Girls Make Beats ===
Spendlove serves on the board of Girls Make Beats, a nonprofit organization on a mission to close the gender gap in music education and technology. Girls Make Beats empowers girls ages 5 to 17 by expanding the female presence of music producers, DJs, and audio engineers, providing music technology education, leadership development, and mentorship. The organization has served over 1,300 girls across the country and around the world since 2012, with three-quarters of participants coming from historically underrepresented groups. Spendlove's involvement reflects his commitment to diversity, access, and the next generation of music creators.

=== University Mentorship (UCLA & USC) ===
Spendlove regularly mentors aspiring composers and musicians at the University of California, Los Angeles (UCLA) and the University of Southern California (USC). He lectures on music supervision, film scoring, and the business of entertainment.

=== Education Through Music – Los Angeles ===
Spendlove has been a supporter of Education Through Music–Los Angeles (ETM-LA), a nonprofit dedicated to providing music education to students in under-resourced schools in the LA Unified School District.

=== Poppy Jasper International Film Festival ===
Spendlove has been a major supporter and participant in the Poppy Jasper International Film Festival, a regional festival screening films at venues in Morgan Hill, Gilroy, Hollister, and San Juan Bautista, California. He has participated in panels and performances, including performing alongside musician Polo Jones at the Poppy Bash.

== Personal Life & Business Ventures ==
Randy Spendlove is married to Alecia Spendlove, a commercial actor and philanthropist who has co-chaired Education Through Music – Los Angeles benefit galas alongside entertainment industry colleagues.

=== Verse ===
Randy and Alecia Spendlove are investors in Verse, an upscale supper club and live music venue located in North Hollywood, California.

=== Olive + Lavender Farms ===
In 2022, Spendlove and his longtime friend Jennifer Wood launched Olive + Lavender Farms in Los Olivos, in the Santa Ynez Valley of Santa Barbara County. The farm features 150 olive trees and produces a range of artisanal olive oils and balsamic vinegars, including a garlic-infused olive oil. The farm is positioned in the heart of Santa Barbara wine country and reflects Spendlove's passion for food and creating environments where people can connect.

== Selected Artist & Composer Collaborations ==
Artist / Composer	Project(s)	Role
Hans Zimmer	Top Gun: Maverick	Score
Lorne Balfe	Mission: Impossible series; Top Gun: Maverick	Score
John Williams	The Adventures of Tintin	Score
Howard Shore	Hugo	Score
Michael Giacchino	Star Trek reboot series	Score
Pharrell Williams	The SpongeBob Movie: Sponge Out of Water	Original songs
Lady Gaga	Top Gun: Maverick ("Hold My Hand")	Original song
John Legend & Common	Selma ("Glory")	Original song – Oscar & Golden Globe WIN
Linkin Park	Transformers franchise	Original songs, score partnership & marketing
Imagine Dragons	Transformers: Age of Extinction ("Battle Cry")	Original song & partnership
Beyoncé	Dreamgirls	Performer
Jennifer Hudson	Dreamgirls	Performer (Oscar-winning role)
Elton John	Rocketman	Biopic / catalog
Queen	Bohemian Rhapsody	Biopic / catalog
Ziggy Marley & Stephen Marley	Bob Marley: One Love	Family estate collaboration; performed on soundtrack
Rihanna	Star Trek Beyond ("Sledgehammer")	Original song
Jack White & Elvis Costello	Cold Mountain	Folk/bluegrass soundtrack (Miramax era)
Jan A.P. Kaczmarek	Finding Neverland	Score (Miramax era)
Janet Jackson	A&M Records campaigns (1990s)	Artist
Sheryl Crow	A&M Records campaigns (1990s)	Artist
Bryan Adams	A&M Records campaigns (1990s)	Artist
Soundgarden	A&M Records campaigns (1990s)	Artist
