= Olga Talamante =

American activist (born 1950)

Olga Talamante (born 1950) is a Chicana political activist and the former executive director of the California-based Chicana/Latina Foundation.

== Early life ==
Talamante was born in Mexicali, Baja California, Mexico, to Eduardo and Refugio Talamante. Her father was Mexican and her mother was a Mexican-American woman from Lompoc, California. At the age of eleven, she and her family moved to Gilroy, California, an agricultural community.

She learned English and excelled in her studies, being elected president of her sophomore class and vice president of her senior class at Gilroy High School. She became a naturalized U.S. citizen, and attended the University of California, Santa Cruz, graduating with a degree in Latin American studies.

== Activism ==
There she became active in the anti-Vietnam War peace movement and the Chicano Movement. While doing a field study in Chiapas, Mexico, she came into contact with many Argentines who told her of recent leftist political successes in their country. After graduating, Talamante decided to go to Argentina, and arrived shortly after the election of the Peronist Justicialist Party candidate for president Héctor José Cámpora. She arrived in Azul, Buenos Aires Province, and began working for Juventud Peronista, a poverty-relief agency, in one of the city's poorest sectors.

After the death of Juan Perón, who had resumed control of the government of Argentina after Cámpora's resignation, the Peronist party split into left- and right-wing factions, with the conservatives supporting the government of Isabel Perón, which banned political assembly.

== Imprisonment ==
In November 1974, Talamante was arrested in Azul, Argentina, for political activity, and subsequently imprisoned and tortured.

The Olga Talamante Defense Committee petitioned the United States Congress and State Department for her release. By the time she was freed on March 27, 1976, Talamante had become nationally known. She returned to the San Francisco Bay Area, where she began working for the Argentine Commission for Human Rights.

In her capacity as a representative of the Argentine Commission for Human Rights, she was involved in the case of United States vs. Horacio Daniel Lofredo.

After being released, Talamante continued working with other minority causes in the United States. She was the Western branch Vice President of INROADS, an association aimed at helping Hispanic, African American and Native American business and engineering students to gain college scholarships.

== Other jobs ==
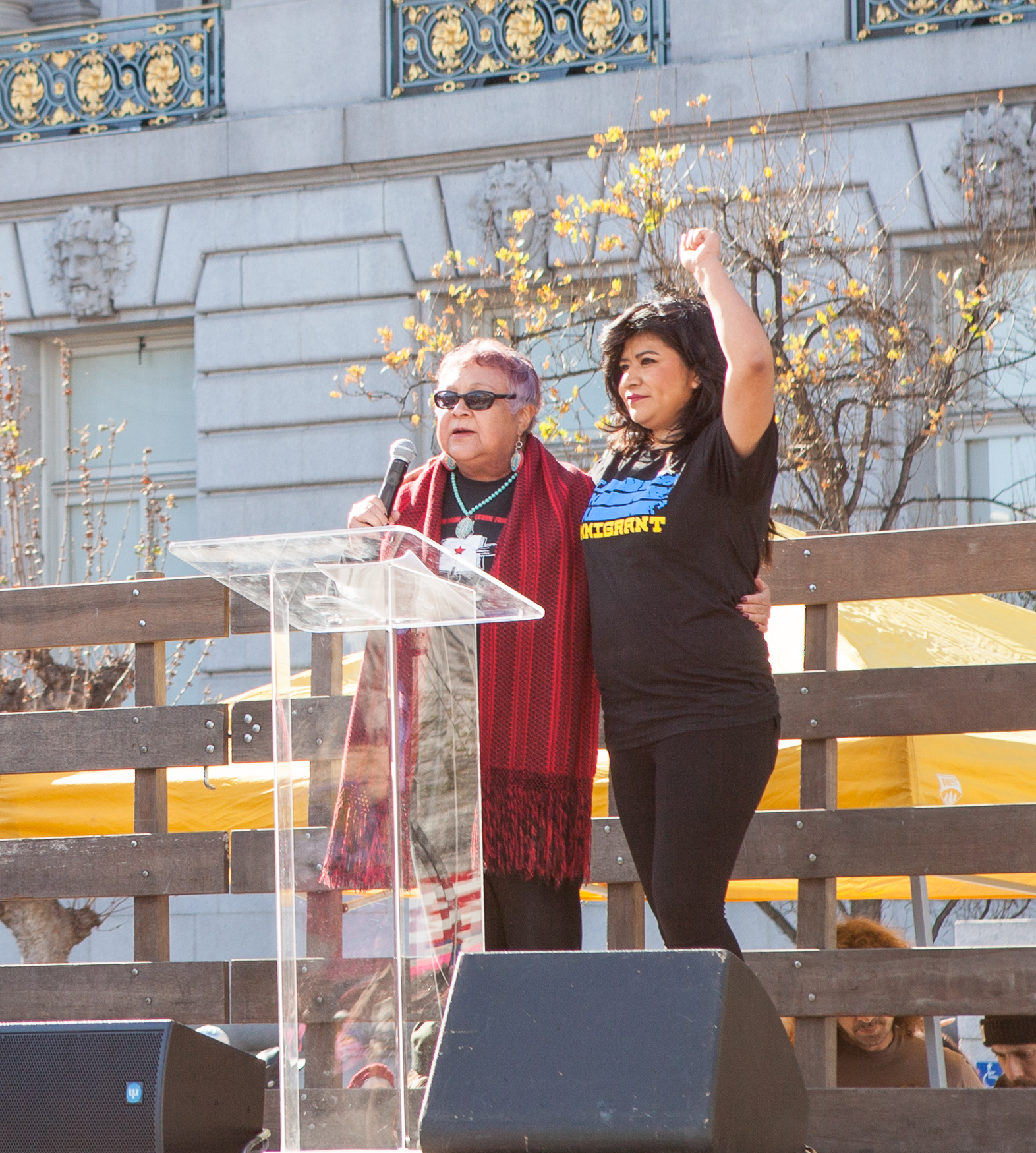
Talamante and a young immigrant speak at the 2018 Women's March San Francisco.

Talamante has worked with Head Start, the YMCA, and the American Friends Service Committee.

Talamante became first executive director of the Chicana/Latina Foundation in January 2003, joining such other notables as artist Viviana Paredes, real estate agent Lorena Hernandez, civil rights advocate Frances E. Contreras, and doctor Olga E. Terrazas, among others, in the organization.

Talamante has served as co-chair of the board of the National Center for Lesbian Rights.

== Awards ==
Talamante has been the recipient of a number of community awards in the San Francisco area, including the KQED-TV award for "heroes and heroines of the Latino community', the Girl Scouts of the USA Daisy award, the Hispanic Magazine "Diversity award", and the "Women Making History Award" from the San Francisco Commission on the Status of Women.

== Personal life ==
Talamante is openly lesbian.
