= Chicana/Latina Foundation =

US non-profit organization

The Chicana/Latina Foundation
- Founded: 1977
- Purpose: Professional and leadership development for Chicana/Latina women
- Location: Burlingame, CA, USA
- Region served: United States
- Key people: Adriana Ayala, Executive Director
- Revenue: $974,318 (2022)
- Employees: 3
- Website: https://chicanalatina.org/

The Chicana/Latina Foundation (CLF) is a non-profit organization that supports professional and leadership development of Latinas. The Foundation's mission is to support Chicanas/Latinas through college scholarships, personal growth, educational programs, technology, cultural arts, and professional advancement.

== History ==
In 1977, three first generation Latinas (Yolanda Ronquillo, Olga Terrazas, and Margaret Santos) who attended the University of California, Berkeley founded the organization to support future generations of Latina college students. The founding of the organization drew inspiration from Comisión Femenil Mexicana Nacional. The first Executive Director was Olga Talamante. In 2014, the organization created a program to provide home Internet access for low-income children.

The Chicana/Latina Foundation is a Latino-serving nonprofit organization that receives funding from the San Francisco-based Latino Community Foundation, which supports organizations led by Hispanics for Hispanics through Hispanic donors.
