= I Stepped Onto a Bee =

Studio album by Sunny Murray, John Edwards, and Tony Bevan
- Released: 2011
- Recorded: August 19, 2010
- Studio: Eastcote Studio, London
- Genre: Free jazz
- Label: Foghorn Records; FGCD014

Sunny Murray chronology
| Sonic Liberation Front Meets Sunny Murray (2010) | I Stepped Onto a Bee (2011) | Boom Boom Cat (2011) |

I Stepped Onto a Bee is an album by American drummer Sunny Murray, bassist John Edwards, and saxophonist Tony Bevan. It was recorded in August 2010 at Eastcote Studio in London, and was released in 2011 by Foghorn Records.

== Reception ==
In a review for The Wire, Andy Hamilton wrote: "The shorter tracks here bring a focus to the trio's surprisingly spry interplay as a dynamic working group... [Murray's] famous banshee wail may have been replaced by a low grumble, but when the cymbals start to churn and seethe, he's still capable of creating his own weather system."

Ken Waxman of Jazz Word stated: "the wit of the proceedings, coupled with the intensity in Bevan's playing, brings to mind some of [Sonny] Rollins' mid-century sax-bass-drum milestones like Way Out West... the balance among the three never shifts. It may be Murray who slows down the tempo to medium, or Edwards whose plucks stabilize it, but overall the results are concurrently impressionistically emphasized and steely inventive."

Stewart Lee commented: "Bevan and Edwards are in uncharacteristically bluesalicious mode here. Having spent a lifetime dodging melodies in search of transcendence, they circumnavigate the carvery to load up on fat licks. Murray kicks against walking bass and ecstatic solos, and sonic screwdrivers the cymbals, delivering a joint high."

== Track listing ==
All compositions by Sunny Murray, John Edwards, and Tony Bevan.

1. "Part I" – 9:04
2. "Part II" – 7:29
3. "Part III" – 6:16
4. "Part IV" – 5:28
5. "Part V" – 4:16
6. "Part VI" – 9:20

== Personnel ==
- Sunny Murray – drums
- Tony Bevan – tenor saxophone
- John Edwards – double bass
