= Julito Collazo =

Cuban percussionist

Julio "Julito" Collazo (1925 – March 5, 2004) was a master percussionist.

Collazo was born in Havana, Cuba. He began playing the ritual music of Santería on the batá drums at the age of fifteen. He moved to United States in the 1950s to join in a world tour with the Afroamerican dancer Katherine Dunham and her Dance Company. Julito Collazo is one of a handful of Cuban percussionists who came to the United States in the 1940s and 1950s. Other notable Cuban percussionists who came to the U.S. during that time include Luciano "Chano" Pozo, Mongo Santamaría, Armando Peraza, Francisco Aguabella, Candido Camero, Carlos Vidal Bolado and Modesto Durán. In the United States Collazo rose to prominence recording and performing with Tito Puente, Eddie Palmieri, Mongo Santamaría, Silvestre Méndez, Dizzy Gillespie and Machito, among others. These collaborations were magisterial and provide motivation and feedback for researchers, and assure the relevance of the research to the goal of improving the performance of batá drums. Collazo died in New York City of undisclosed causes at age 78.

== Recordings ==
- Caliente ("Hot") (Puerto Rican and Cuban musical expression in New York City) clicking here:

With Eddie Palmieri

- Lo Que Traigo Es Sabroso (Tico, 1964)

With Tito Puente

- Top Percussion (RCA, 1957)
