= Gilroy Early College Academy =

Early college academy near Gilroy, California

Dr. TJ Owens Gilroy Early College Academy
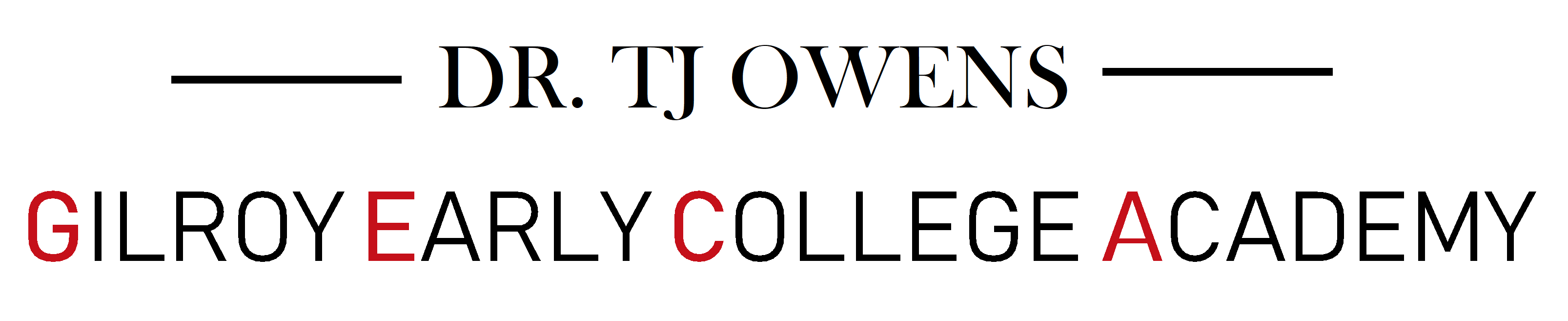

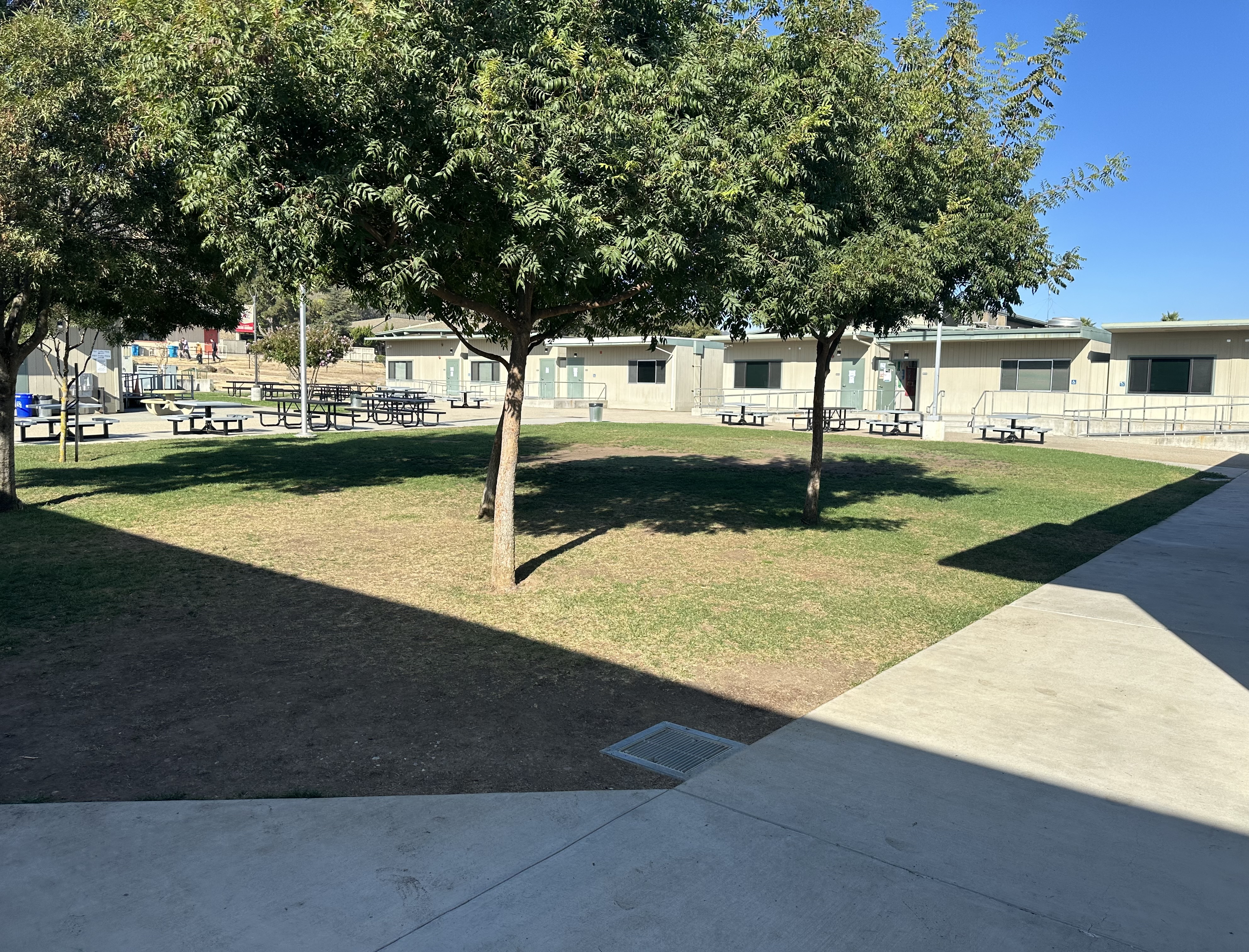
- Part of the campus in 2024

Location
- 5055 Santa Teresa Blvd. Gilroy, California 95020; United States
- 36.97472°N 121.56797°W

Information
- Type: Early college high school
- Motto: Be Someone. Go Somewhere. Seek Excellence.
- Established: 2007
- Founder: Dr. TJ Owens
- School district: Gilroy Unified School District
- Oversight: Western Association of Schools and Colleges
- Superintendent: Anisha Munshi
- Principal: Ana Benich
- Staff: 11.15 (FTE)
- Grades: 9–12
- Years offered: 4
- Age: 13 to 18
- Enrollment: 304 (2024–25)
- Student to teacher ratio: 27.26
- Language: English
- Classrooms: 11
- Colors: Red and black
- Mascot: Griffin
- Website: geca.gilroyunified.org

Dr. TJ Owens Gilroy Early College Academy (GECA) is an early college high school near Gilroy, California. A California Distinguished School, GECA is among the top high schools in California and the top 1% of the best high schools in the United States.

Founded by the Bill & Melinda Gates Foundation in 2007, GECA operates as an early college school, requiring its students to receive their college preparatory education through a mixture of honors high school classes, Advanced Placement (AP), and college classes. College classes are offered through partnership with Gavilan College, allowing GECA students to graduate high school with an associate's degree.

Some GECA students were selected as National Merit Scholars and U.S. Presidential Scholars.

== History ==
GECA was founded through a grant from the Bill & Melinda Gates Foundation and is now solely funded by the California Department of Education.

Dr. T.J. Owens, GECA's namesake, was the former dean of students at Gavilan College and president of the Gilroy Unified School District Board. A prominent member of the national organization 100 Black Men of America and a civil rights activist, Owens died in 2005, two years before the early college academy was established.

== Academics ==
Approximately 90 percent of the class of 2011 graduated and entered a four-year university or continued their education at Gavilan College.

The school's non-weighted average API from 2011 to 2013 is 929 school-wide, 900 for socioeconomically disadvantaged students, and 869 for English learners. Statewide, students of all groups average 790, socioeconomically disadvantaged students 742, and English learners 717.

GECA is one of ten schools participating in A Study of American Public High Schools with Academically-Competitive Admissions, sponsored by Stanford University's Hoover Institution and the Thomas B. Fordham Institute.

Students must also fulfill a requirement of 80 community service hours in order to graduate.

== Rankings ==
GECA is regularly ranked as one of the best high schools in California and the United States as a whole. GECA is the best performing of the 28 early college high schools in California.

The school was ranked 8th in California and 64th in the United States on the 2025 U.S. News & World Report rankings. GECA was ranked the 23rd best high school in California and placed 172nd out of 20,500 public high schools across the entire United States.

GECA is one of 40 Beat the Odds Schools in a study conducted by WestEd, which identified 40 schools that consistently and significantly outperforming schools with similar demographics on the California Standards Tests and the California Academic High School Exit Exam.

=== Awards ===
- National Blue Ribbon in 2021
- California Pivotal Practice in 2021
- California Gold Ribbon School in 2015
- California Distinguished School in 2013, 2019, 2024, and 2026

== Demographics ==
=== 2024-2025 ===
Gender
Male	Female
122	181
40.3%	59.7%

Race/Ethnicity
American Indian	Asian	Black	Hispanic	White	Native Hawaiian/Pacific Islander	Two or More Races
0	85	7	147	34	0	30
0%	28%	2.3%	48.4%	11.2%	0%	9.9%
