= Hollister High School =

Location
- 1220 Monterey St. Hollister, California 95023; United States; 36°50′27″N 121°24′17″W

Information
- Former name: San Benito High School
- Type: Free public
- Established: 1875
- School district: San Benito High School District
- NCES District ID: 0634140
- NCES School ID: 063414005344
- Principal: Kevin Medeiros
- Faculty: 102
- Teaching staff: 143.61 (FTE)
- Grades: 9 to 12
- Enrollment: 3,316 (2024-2025)
- Student to teacher ratio: 23.09
- Campus type: Open
- Colors: Red; White
- Athletics conference: CIF Central Coast Section Pacific Coast League
- Mascot: Hank the Haybaler
- Team name: Haybalers
- Rivals: Gilroy High School; Palma High School
- Website: https://hhs.sanbenitohsd.gov/

Hollister High School (HHS) is a public high school in Hollister, California, United States. Operated by the San Benito High School District, it serves students in grades 9–12 from Hollister and surrounding communities in San Benito County. Established in 1875, the school is one of the oldest educational institutions in the county.

Originally known as San Benito High School, the institution adopted the name Hollister High School in 2022. The school offers a comprehensive college-preparatory curriculum, Advanced Placement courses, career technical education pathways, and specialized academic programs. Its athletic teams, known as the Haybalers, compete in interscholastic sports in the Pacific Coast Athletic League.

== History ==
The origins of Hollister High School date to 1875, when secondary education was established in Hollister, California. The school developed alongside the city’s growing educational system and served students from Hollister and surrounding rural communities in San Benito County. Throughout its early history, the institution was referred to by several names, including San Benito County High School.

As the population of Hollister and the surrounding county increased, enrollment at the school grew, creating a need for additional educational facilities. In 1908, construction began on a new school building, which was completed in 1909. The building became the school’s principal structure and was later retained as its main administration building.

During the first half of the 20th century, the school expanded its campus to accommodate increasing enrollment and additional educational programs. Among the facilities developed during this period were the O’Donnell Gymnasium and the Davis Library.

On May 26, 1955, a fire destroyed much of the school’s campus, including a building constructed in 1909. The building had also been used by San Benito Junior College, which shared facilities with the high school. The fire destroyed classrooms and administrative records, resulting in the loss of a substantial amount of historical documentation relating to the institution’s early years. Following the fire, the school undertook repairs and reconstruction to restore its facilities. Additional buildings and campus improvements were introduced in subsequent decades to accommodate the school’s continued growth.

Throughout its history, the school has been associated with both the names San Benito High School and Hollister High School. Although San Benito High School became its commonly recognized official name, Hollister High School continued to appear in historical publications, school materials, and athletic references. In June 2006, two students presented a proposal to the San Benito High School District Board of Trustees advocating for the school’s official name to be changed to Hollister High School. Supporters argued that the proposed name better represented the school’s location and its connection to the city. The proposal received attention from students and members of the local community but did not immediately result in a name change.

The possibility of renaming the institution returned to discussion in 2022 as the district considered plans for a second comprehensive high school in San Benito County. District officials cited the need to distinguish the existing Hollister campus from a future school as one of the reasons for adopting a new name. On June 28, 2022, the San Benito High School District Board of Trustees unanimously approved the renaming of San Benito High School to Hollister High School. The change formalized a name that had already been widely used by students, alumni, and members of the surrounding community.

== Campus and facilities ==
Hollister High School is located at 1220 Monterey Street in Hollister, California. The campus encompasses more than 80 acres and contains academic buildings, administrative facilities, athletic complexes, and student gathering spaces. Over time, the campus has undergone multiple expansions and modernization projects to accommodate increasing enrollment and the development of additional educational programs.

The school’s academic facilities include general-purpose classrooms, science laboratories, computer facilities, and specialized instructional buildings. Among its newer facilities are the Career Technical Education (CTE) building, which houses classrooms and workshops for vocational and technical instruction, and the Science and Robotics building, which provides space for science education, engineering, and robotics programs.

Aerial view of Hollister High School

The Visual and Performing Arts and Academic building houses facilities for arts education and additional academic instruction. These buildings were constructed as part of the San Benito High School District’s Facilities Master Plan, which included extensive campus modernization and expansion projects.

The campus includes the Davis Library, which provides students with resources and space for studying, research, and academic activities. The school also maintains administrative offices, counseling facilities, and student support services.

In October 2024, the district celebrated the completion of a new Student Union and Cafeteria. The approximately 8,500-square-foot facility includes a commercial kitchen, food service areas, indoor multipurpose spaces, and an outdoor student quad. The building was developed to expand dining capacity and provide a centralized gathering space for students.

Hollister High School maintains a collection of athletic facilities used for physical education, school athletics, and extracurricular activities. These include Andy Hardin Stadium, the Baler Aquatic Center, Ray Barragan Softball Field, and multipurpose athletic fields.

Andy Hardin Stadium serves as a venue for school athletic events, including football. The Baler Aquatic Center provides facilities for swimming and water polo, while Ray Barragan Softball Field serves the school’s softball program. Additional athletic facilities include track and field areas, locker rooms, and outdoor practice spaces. The district’s facilities expansion projects also included improvements to athletic infrastructure, such as field lighting and additional multipurpose spaces.

== Academics ==
Hollister High School runs on an alternating block schedule split into "red days," periods 1 through 3, and "white days," periods 4 through 6. The days are named after the school's main colors. Each block is 90 minutes long, except for the 1st block of the day (1st and 4th period) which is 95 minutes to allow the reading of the school bulletin. There is also an optional, 65-minute 0 (zero) period, that is run before school, Tuesday through Friday. In addition, for 30 minutes inbetween the 1st and 2nd blocks of the day, the school offers a Haybaler Support Time (HST) where students can choose a class of their choice to attend in order to receive specific education support.

The school offers a diverse curriculum consisting of core academic subjects, elective courses, advanced placement (AP) classes, and career-oriented programs. Its academic departments include English, mathematics, science, social science, physical education, and world languages, including Spanish, French, and American Sign Language. Students can also participate in visual and performing arts courses such as band, drama, dance, ceramics, and drawing. The school provides Career Technical Education (CTE) programs in fields such as agriculture, automotive technology, engineering, business management, culinary arts, photography, multimedia, welding, and animal science. Additionally, Hollister High School offers specialized academic programs, including the Early College Academy, Academy of Health Science, and AVID, which provide opportunities for students to explore career pathways and earn college credits through dual enrollment.

== Athletics ==
The schools athletics teams are known by the school's mascot, Hank the Haybaler, or more commonly the 'Balers. The school's colors are red and white. The team competes in 16 sports in the Pacific Coast Athletic League as part of the Central Coast Section.

The sports the school offers are as follows:

Fall	Winter	Spring
Football (boys)	Basketball (boys and girls)	Baseball (boys)
Flag football (girls)	Soccer (boys and girls)	Softball (girls)
Golf (girls)	Wrestling (boys and girls)	Golf (boys)
Tennis (girls)	Cheerleading (girls)	Tennis (boys)
Cross country (boys and girls)		Track and field (boys and girls)
Water polo (boys and girls)		Swimming and diving (boys and girls)
Volleyball (girls)		Volleyball (boys)
Field hockey (girls)		Lacrosse (boys and girls)
Cheerleading (girls)		

== Notable alumni ==
- Conner Menez, Major League Baseball player for the San Francisco Giants
- Cade McNown, American football player
- Robert A. Rivas, Speaker of the California State Assembly
