= Boom Boom Cat =

Live album by Sunny Murray
- Released: 2011
- Recorded: September 1, 2009
- Venue: The Vortex, London
- Genre: Free jazz
- Label: Foghorn Records; FOGCD011

Sunny Murray chronology
I Stepped Onto a Bee (2011)	Boom Boom Cat (2011)

Boom Boom Cat is a live album by drummer Sunny Murray. It was recorded in September 2009 at The Vortex in London and released in 2011 by Foghorn Records. Murray is joined on the album by saxophonist Tony Bevan and bassist John Edwards.

== Reception ==
Professional ratings
Review scores
Source	Rating
The Jazz Mann	4/5 stars

In a review for Paris Transatlantic, Nate Dorward stated that the album has "a celebratory flavour," and wrote: "The main feature here is the hour-long title-track, paced throughout by Murray's trademark slow-burn hi-hat chomp, which sings out as strongly and persistently as Bevan's horns and (after a while) gives you the pleasantly dizzy sense of having been shaken like a rag doll."

Stewart Lee, writing for The Times, commented: "Murray induces uncharacteristic snatches of buried melody from Bevan's roaring, rasping horn, and jazzy, spongy licks from Edwards's scrambling strings, while the British duo inspire career highs of intensity from the indefatigable 73-year-old."

Ken Waxman of All About Jazz-New York remarked: "this CD demonstrates that, with the right associates, Murray’s music is as contemporary today as it was decades ago."

In an article for The Jazz Mann, Tim Owen stated: "This set must have been exhausting for the audience to experience, let alone for the trio to play.... It's a shame that the unrefined production of this recording... and the daunting length of its tracks might limit the audience for this album, because for anyone interested in the continuing state of free energy music it's near state of the art, and comes highly recommended."

A reviewer for the Morning Star wrote: "As the trio sets off on the 56 minutes of the title number, images of the jazz past assailed me. Right through the history of recorded jazz the impact of US jazz giants playing with their British confreres has always brought out the most inspired and vibrant sounds of the Brits... on Boom Boom Cat, Bevan and Edwards play as equals with their great septuagenarian drums partner... It's a relentless trio and right through the performance none of the threesome tire or slacken."

== Track listing ==
All compositions by Sunny Murray, Tony Bevan, and John Edwards.

1. "Boom Boom Cat" – 57:00
2. "Ballad For G" – 12:57

== Personnel ==
- Sunny Murray – drums
- Tony Bevan – soprano saxophone, tenor saxophone, bass saxophone
- John Edwards – double bass
