= Gilroy High School =

Coordinates: 36°59′46″N 121°34′32″W

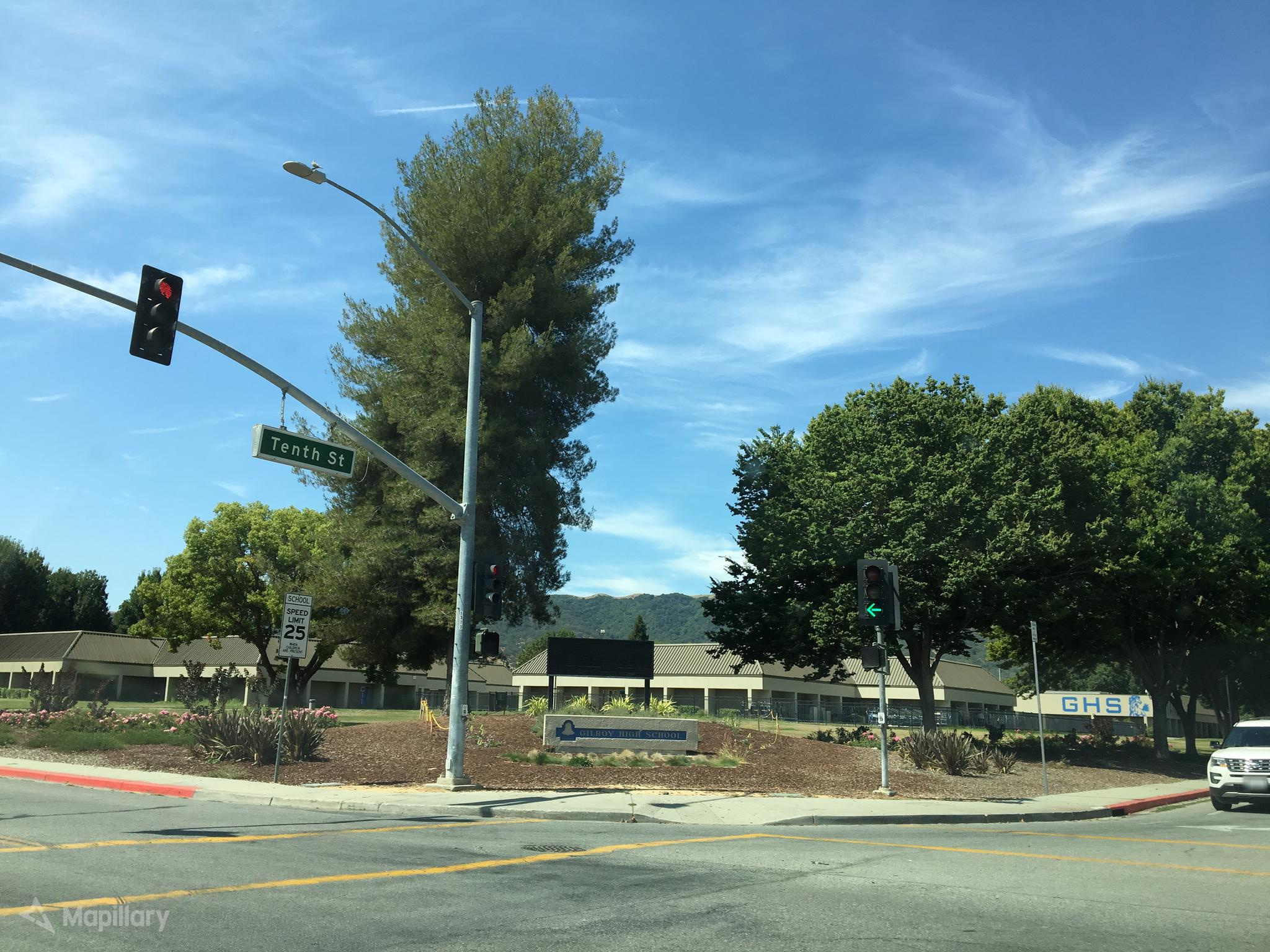

Location
- 750 West Tenth Street; Gilroy, California; United States

Information
- Type: Public
- School district: Gilroy Unified School District
- Superintendent: Anisha Munshi
- Principal: Julie Berggren
- Assistant principals: Jennifer Spinetti; Stacey Helguera
- Teaching staff: 75.01 (FTE)
- Grades: 9–12
- Enrollment: 1,664 (2023–2024)
- Student to teacher ratio: 22.18
- Colors: Blue, Yellow, and White
- Athletics: 17 Interscholastic Sports
- Athletics conference: Monterey Bay League; CIF Central Coast Section; California Interscholastic Federation
- Mascot: Mustang
- Rivals: Hollister High School; Christopher High School
- Website: gilroyhs.gilroyunified.org

Gilroy High School is a co-educational public school located in Gilroy, California, that serves the city of Gilroy. A part of the Gilroy Unified School District, is one of two public comprehensive high schools in the city and has an approximate enrollment of 1,500 students.

== History ==
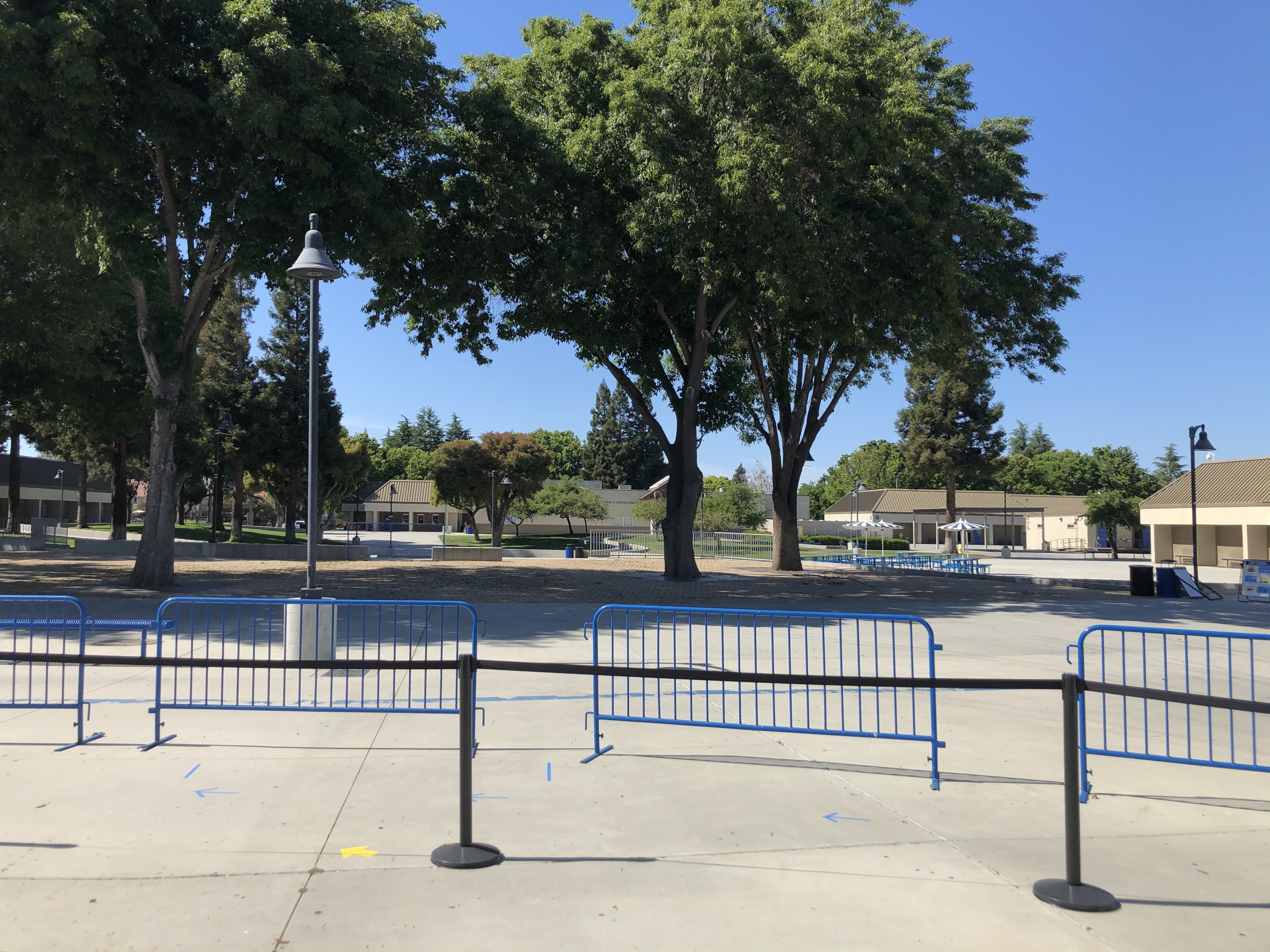
Gilroy High School campus

Gilroy High School opened in 1911 at the site that now houses South Valley Middle School on IOOF Ave. The campus moved to its current location in 1978.

The school served as a temporary mass vaccination site in 2021 during the COVID-19 pandemic.

== Curriculum ==
Gilroy High offers a variety of course options. There are more than 15 Advanced Placement courses offered. There are a variety of fine arts, such as choir, band, drama, and art. There are many Career and Technical Education (CTE) programs, including automotive mechanics, animation, culinary arts, floral design, and sports medicine.

Starting with the Class of 2018, all students are expected to meet the University of California A-G entrance requirements. In addition, beginning with the Class of 2013, all students must complete 80 hours of community service during their high school careers.

Gilroy High is one of the few high schools offering Project Lead the Way's Biomedical Sciences program. This four-year program allows students to investigate the roles of biomedical professionals as they study the concepts of human medicine, physiology, genetics, microbiology, and public health.

Gilroy High completes the District's Spanish Dual Immersion K-12 Program by offering classes such as Biology in Spanish.

== Athletics ==
The school's mascot is the mustang and all athletic teams representing the school go by the mustang nickname. The school's colors are blue, yellow and white. All of the school's athletic teams compete in the Central Coast Section (CCS).

The boys varsity track and field team won the CCS team championship in 2011.

Fall	Winter	Spring
Marching Band (boys and girls)	Football (boys)	Baseball (boys)
Volleyball (girls)	Soccer (boys and girls)	Softball (girls)
Golf (girls)	Wrestling (boys and girls)	Golf (boys)
Tennis (girls)	Cheerleading (girls)	Tennis (boys)
Cross Country (boys and girls)	Basketball (boys and girls)	Track & Field (boys and girls)
Water Polo (boys and girls)		Swimming (boys and girls)
Cheerleading (girls)		Volleyball (boys)
Field Hockey (girls)		Lacrosse (girls)
		Gymnastics (girls)

== Awards and recognition ==
Gilroy High received California's Distinguished School Awards in 1994 and 2009.

== Notable alumni ==
- Ivie Anderson (ca. class of 1923): jazz vocalist, notably with Duke Ellington
- Frank LaCorte (class of 1969): former Major League Baseball pitcher
- John Canzano (class of 1989): Sports columnist, TV-radio commentator, Associated Press Sports Editors award winner in column writing and investigative reporting
- Jason Conrad (class of 2008): Professional basketball player
- Jesse Delgado (class of 2010): collegiate wrestler for University of Illinois, two-time (2013, 2014) NCAA national wrestling champion at 125 pound weight class
- Jeff Garcia (class of 1988): Professional football quarterback in Canadian Football League (CFL) (1994–1998), NFL (1999–2009), and UFL (2010); four-time CFL West Division All-Star and four-time NFL Pro Bowl selection; was quarterback for the San Francisco 49ers from 1999 to 2003
- Chris Gimenez (class of 2001): Professional baseball player, catcher for Minnesota Twins
- Charles Gubser (class of 1932): Republican member of United States House of Representatives for California's 10th congressional district from 1953 to 1974; taught at school (then known as Gilroy Union High School) from 1939 to 1943
- Robert Guerrero (class of 2001): Professional boxer
- Alfonso Motagalvan (class of 2004): professional soccer player
- John Ordway (class of 1968): ambassador
- Kevin Rubio (class of 1986): filmmaker and writer
- Randy Spendlove (class of 1982): record producer, songwriter, Grammy Award winner
- Olga Talamante: Chicana political activist

== Notable staff ==
- Daniel Cormier: UFC Heavyweight and Light Heavyweight Champion. 2 time Olympian. Head wrestling coach.
- Marco Sanchez: Wrestler for Puerto Rico at the 1996 Summer Olympic games. Former principal.
- Mark Speckman: American gridiron football coach and former player. Former football head coach at Gilroy High School for the 1983–85 seasons.

== See also ==
- Gilroy Unified School District
