= The Gearbox Explodes! =

Live album by Sunny Murray
- Released: 2008
- Recorded: October 24, 2006
- Venue: St. Dominics Retreat Working Mens Club, Newcastle upon Tyne, England
- Genre: Free jazz
- Label: Foghorn Records; FOGCD009

Sunny Murray chronology
| Perles Noires (2005) | The Gearbox Explodes! (2008) | Sonic Liberation Front Meets Sunny Murray (2010) |

The Gearbox Explodes! is a live album by drummer Sunny Murray. It was recorded in October 2006 at the St. Dominics Retreat Working Mens Club in Newcastle upon Tyne, England, and was released in 2008 by Foghorn Records. On the album, Murray is joined by saxophonist Tony Bevan and bassist John Edwards.

== Reception ==
Professional ratings
Review scores
| Source | Rating |
|---|---|
| The Penguin Guide to Jazz | 3.5/4 stars |
| All About Jazz | 4/5 stars |

The authors of the Penguin Guide to Jazz Recordings described the album as "a terrific audio experience," and noted that some of the material on the recording was intended for inclusion in a documentary film, stating: "It should make for riveting watching: Murray moving over his kit like a dancing painter, Edwards bent over his fretboard, plucking out lines as hard as a shower of pebbles, and Bevan wrestling sound out of his two hefty horns."

In an article for All About Jazz, Chris May called the album an "exercise in collective music making of the purest and least hierarchical kind," and wrote: "Music so wholly unpremeditated and in-the-moment as this requires listening musicianship of the highest degree, and courage on the part of its creators. The analogy has probably been used before, but free improvisation is not unlike skydiving. In defiance of caution, or indeed sanity, you jump out of a plane into a void and trust in your parachute, or in this case your fellow musicians, to bring you down safely. The Gearbox Explodes! succeeds because Murray,... Bevan and... Edwards are each fearless and have, over time, developed a level of group empathy which enables deep and vigorous interaction."

Stewart Lee, writing for The Times, noted the humor in hearing Murray's group perform at a working men's club, and stated: "You can sense Sunny's boys start to snag the regular drinkers during the first of three lengthy binges. The saxophonist Bevan relishes accompanying a legend; Edwards is the best bassist in Britain. All play like they have something to prove."

== Track listing ==
All compositions by Sunny Murray, Tony Bevan, and John Edwards.

1. "Right On Guys" – 37:47
2. "Hold It Right There" – 6:06
3. "The Gearbox Explodes!" – 20:21

== Personnel ==
- Sunny Murray – drums
- Tony Bevan – tenor saxophone, bass saxophone
- John Edwards – double bass
