= Batá drum =

Yoruba percussion instrument

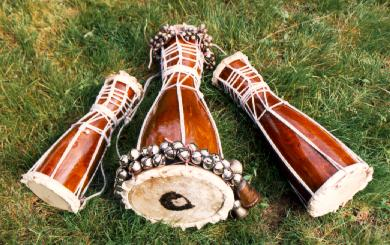
- Batá drums (from left: Okónkolo, Iyá, Itótele) (photo courtesy Harold Muñiz)

Percussion instrument
- Classification: Percussion
- Hornbostel–Sachs classification: 211.242.12 (Individual double-skin hourglass-shaped drums, both heads played)

Musicians
- Irakere, Julito Collazo

The bàtá drum is a double-headed hourglass drum with one end larger than the other. The percussion instrument is still used for its original purpose as it is one of the most important drums in the Yoruba land and used for traditional and religious activities among the Yoruba of western Nigeria. Batá drums have been used in the religion known as Santería in Cuba since the 1800s, and in Puerto Rico and the United States since the 1950s. Today, they are also used for semi-religious musical entertainment in Nigeria and in secular, popular music. The early function of the batá was as a drum of different gods, of royalty, of ancestors and a drum of politicians, impacting all spheres of life in Yoruba land.

Batá drums are made by fastening skin of goats with wires on a hollowed wood body. Batá drums are made from a solid wood log from the oma tree. The drum's shells are carved by hands and assembled in traditionally. The drums are assembled without any metal parts, the playing heads are goat skin, the tension straps are durable cowhide.

== History ==
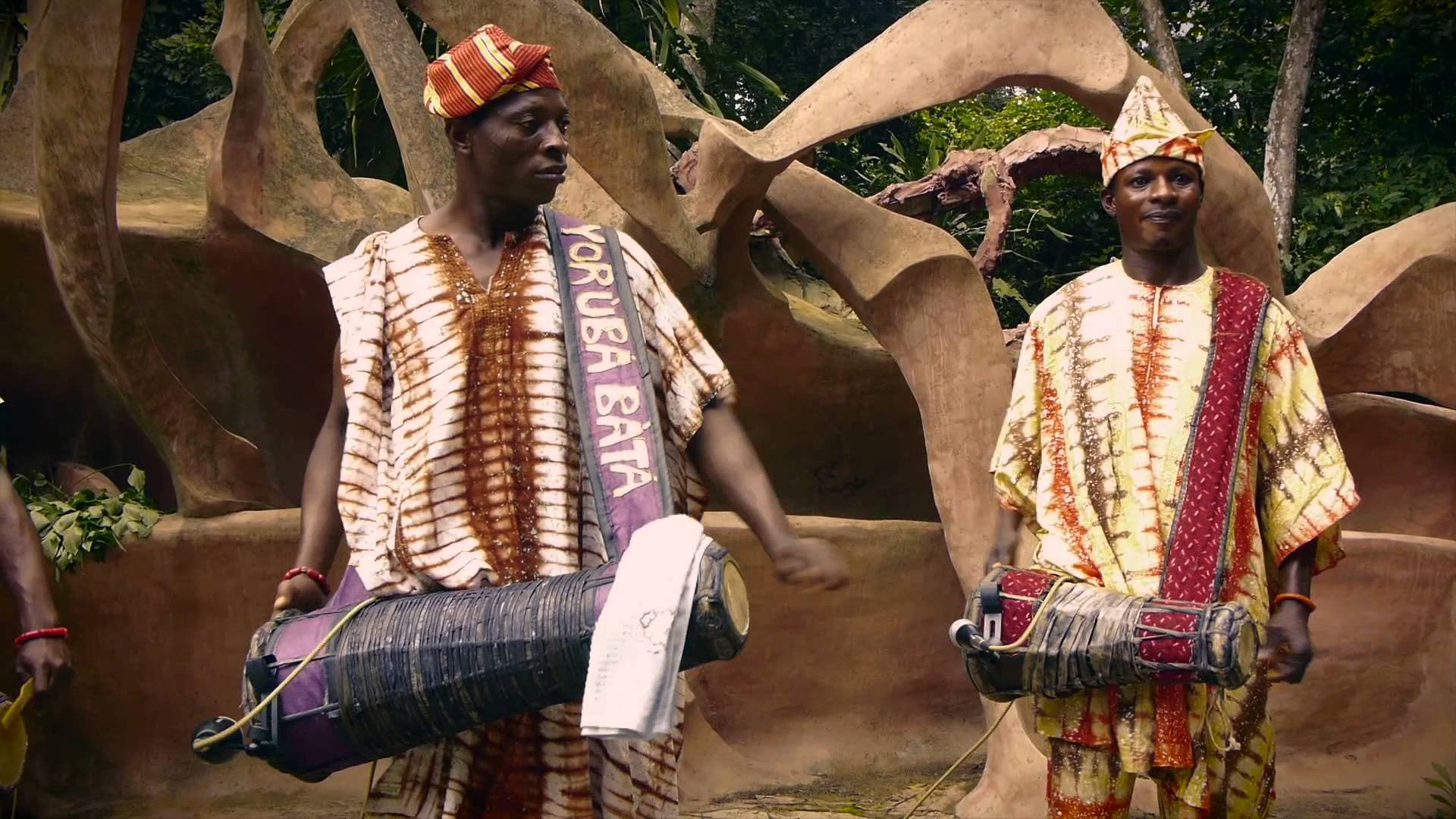
Today, batá drum and Orisa dances attract a large number of tourists, who see them as pure Yoruba tradition, to Cuba.

Several different types of batá drum have existed throughout the world. Cultures in which the drums originated used them for religious ceremonies, as did the Yorùbá, and since their introduction to Cuba in the 1820s, have come to be an important part of the perceived culture of the southwestern Nigerian people.

The drum dates back roughly 500 years, and is believed to have been introduced by a Yoruba king named Shangó el rey del tambor. Despite its long history, awareness of the instrument didn't spread until the 1800s slave trade, during which almost 300,000 Africans were brought to Cuba. The religion and beliefs the Yorùbá brought with them eventually became the basis for what is known as Lukumí (or Santería in Cuba). This religion spawned the creation of the first "sacred" batá in Cuba around 1830 by a Yorùbá slave named Añabi.

The batá slowly became inducted into Cuban culture, and began to take on more secular roles. They were first heard publicly in a 1935 broadcast over Cuban radio as part of folk music. Uses such as this have grown as knowledge of the instrument has spread. Beyond its use in Lukumí, more and more musicians use versions of the drums in recordings or performances. These "non-sacred" batá drums are called aberínkula—profane batá (see Sacred-profane dichotomy). Batá drums and rhythms began to be used in other genres, most notably in Cuban timba, jazz and hip hop. In Nigeria, Bàtá drums are used in popular music genres. Fusions with Fújì music became popular during the 1990s, as documented in Yorùbá Bàtá Goes Global (2007) by Debbie Klein. In the 1970s, a mixture of batá drums and big band called Son-Batá or batá rock became popular, a genre highly influenced by Irakere. Skilled secular musicians such as Julito Collazo made appearances in the United States throughout the twentieth century, helping to spread use of the drum in Latin music.

== The Lukumí and the batá ==
The Lukumí (or commonly called santería) religion and batá drums are closely associated. The drums are played simultaneously (often with a rattle or "atchere") to create polyrhythmic compositions, or "toques", during santería ceremonies. A ceremony with batá drums is generally known as a "toque," "tambor de santo," or "bembé," but ceremonies can also be accompanied by shaken gourd-rattle "chékere" (in English "shekere") ensembles (usually with tumbadora, also called conga drums).

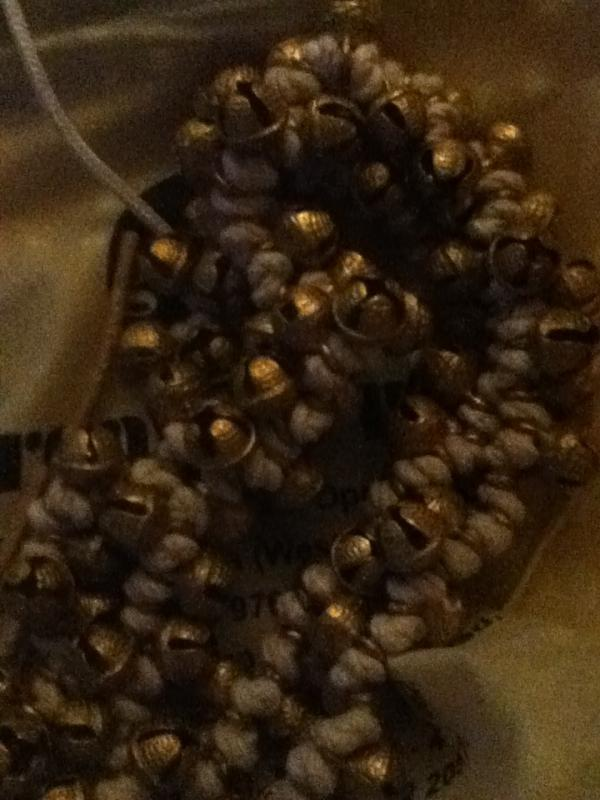

There are estimated to be at least 140 different toques for the spirits (saints, or santos) and their different manifestations. There are two important "rhythm suites" that use the sacred batá drums. The first is called "Oru del Igbodu" (a liturgical set of rhythms), alternatively called "Oru Seco" (literally "Dry Oru", or a sequence of rhythms without vocals), which is usually played at the beginning of a "tambor de santo" that includes 23 standard rhythms for all the orishas. The selections of the second suite include the vocal part to be performed by a vocalist/chanter (akpwon), who engages those attending the ceremony in a call-and-response (African) style musical experience in which a ritual is acted out wherein an "initiate" (one who through the great spirit Añá (Ayan) is granted the ability to perfectly play the batá drums) plays the new batá set, and thereafter is introduced to the old batá set. This is said to "transfer" (through the initiate) the spirit or Añá of the drums from the old set into the new set.

Certain long-standing rules and rituals govern the construction, handling, playing, and care of the sacred batá: traditionally only non-castrated male deer or goat hide was used—female goats along with bulls, cows, and sheep were considered unsuitable; also only an initiate was considered worthy to touch or play the batá as only they have undergone the full ritual of "receiving Añá" granting them the forces deemed necessary to play the drums. Also, before a ceremony, the drummers would wash themselves in omiero, a cleansing water, pray, and for some time abstain from sex.

Also traditionally in Cuba, in Havana the batá are rarely played after sundown, while in Matanzas toque ceremonies often begin at night. This apparent contradiction is not the only one reaching both adherents of Lukumí and others interested in African music, religion and culture. The Cuban style of playing the drums is similar, but in some musical contexts different rhythms may be used.

In the last few decades, the popularity of the batá drums has increased worldwide so significantly that they have begun to be produced in greater numbers both by large western drum companies and individual artisans in Africa using a variety of "non-traditional" materials, including fiberglass drums. Some instrument builders prefer cow skins or even synthetic membranes, while some traditionalists express disdain for this trend and insist upon strict orthodoxy (as others and newcomers embrace the unique tonal ranges of the drums purely for their abstract musical possibilities without observance of traditional rules and rituals). These seemingly conflicting points of view remain paradoxical within the musical "landscape", as has been the global evolution of the Indian tabla, both families of percussion instruments finding application in often surprisingly diverse musical settings far from their roots, although batá perhaps having a closer religious affinity with Lukumí than tabla with Hinduism.

Those who practise Lukumí believe that certain sacred rhythms performed on the batá contain the levels of spiritual forces required to allow such impassioned ritual music to summon Orishas, who in turn inhabit or possess (more in the sense of angelic rather than demonic possession) one or more of the followers gathered for worship and/or participating in the ritual. Followers of Lukumí believe that Orishas are responsible for control of all natural and life-related forces; however, the most-frequently stated primary purpose of the batá is simply for glorification of the deified Changó, also known as "The Great Spirit" or less ceremoniously as thunder and lightning. Hence such ceremonies and rituals are often performed for blessing important life transitions and events like weddings, relocations, passage to the afterlife, or other events and festivities.

== Gender and sexuality ==
According to Kenneth George Schweitzer, an associate professor at Washington College, any heterosexual male can potentially join the Cuban Añá fraternity, who own and play the consecrated drums and maintain the drumming tradition. Women, however, are restricted from playing the batá drum in religious ceremonies. Katherine Hagedorn, an American ethnomusicologist, explains that there is a strong fear that women's general reproductive powers, as well as their menstrual blood, can weaken the powers of the drum. Añá is said to have a female energy, and in order to maintain balance, men must play the consecrated drums. When Haggedorn wrote her seminal book on the batá drum, the few women who played the drum were foreigners.

Vicky Jassey explains that religious beliefs concerning menstruation are central to the taboo restricting women from coming into contact with consecrated batá drums. However, Jassey explains that she found no clear religious reasons that menopausal women continue to be prohibited. Most sworn ritual drummers believe that both women and the Añá deity who resides in the drum will be harmed if they make contact with each other. Moreover, men are required to abstain from sex with a woman the night before a ceremony because this "contamination" is believed to harm the consecrated drums. Gay men are also restricted from contact with the drum, though the reason is unclear and equally does not appear to stem from religious beliefs.

Recently, however, there has been a rise in female drummers, including the group Obiní Batá. In another book, Hagedorn describes that many religious leaders were angry with the breaking of convention when the group first formed in the early 1990s. Eva Despaigne, the founder of the group, and the other members insisted that they do not intend to compete with men or disrespect religious tradition. Rather, they aim to remind audiences of the importance of women in the African culture that birthed the tradition. They play unconsecrated drums, called abericula, as is custom to play in non-ritual performance settings. They have performed internationally in both Europe and Africa.

== Parts of the batá ==
In Cuba, the batá consists of a set of three tapered cylinders of various sizes. Iyá, the largest, is referred to as "mother drum". Itótele, the middle one, and Okónkolo, the smallest, are called "father" and "baby", respectively. In Nigeria, there are five sizes of batá, which can be played either by hand, or using a leather play strap. In Matanzas, the older batá lineages play with one hand and the sole of a shoe or other improvised strap. In Cuba, it is common to see the drums decorated with small bells and chimes, which are called Saworoide or "Saworo" in Yorubaland and Chaworoide or "Chaworó" in Cuba; such bells are attached to one or two "igbaju" leather straps for mounting on the Iya. The larger drum head is called the "enu", while the smaller is the "chacha".

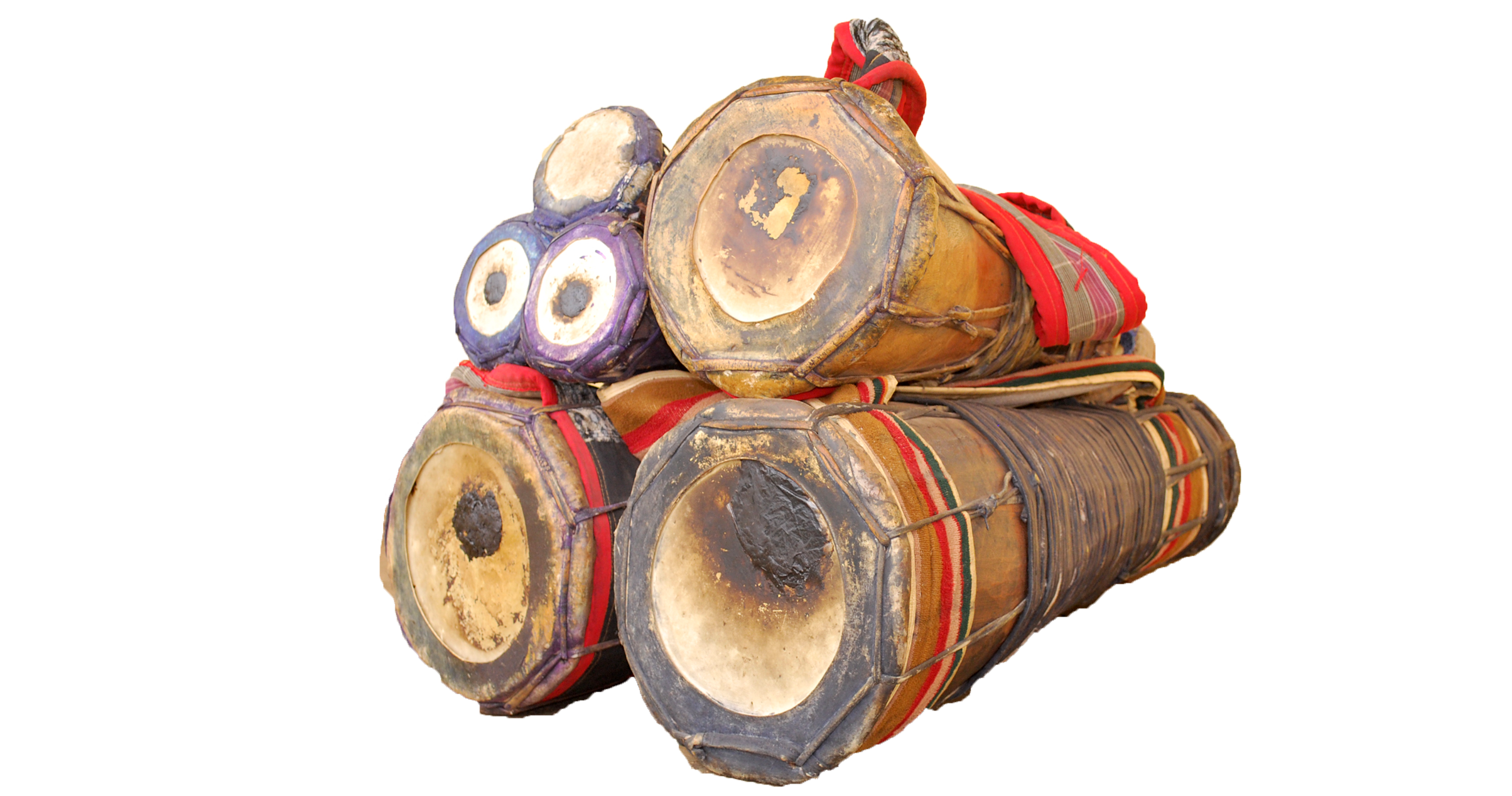
Batá Ensemble

In Yoruba land, batá drums have different parts, which are:

1) Igi Ilu: This is the wooden frame work of the drum made from oma timber.
2) Leather: This is the part of the drum that bring out the tone of the drum. There are two piles of leathers in a batá drum. One is to bring out the tone of the drum, while the other is to cover the one that brings out the tone of the drum.
3) Egi Ilu: This helps to hold the leather firm to the wooden frame. It is usually constructed from a small bunch of thick brooms also known as Igbale gbaro. The brooms are curved to take the proper shape and size of the top and bottom of the wooden frame of the drum. After the sizes have been obtained, strong threads are used to tighten the bunch of thick brooms. After that, pieces of cloths are used to cover the tighten brooms to beautify it.
4) Osan: This is made from thick leathers. This serves as the wire work of the drum. It helps in holding both the leather and Egi Ilu in place.
5) Iro: This is the black substance that is found on the surface of the leather of batá drum. It primary purpose is to vary the tones from different faces of the drum. It is usually obtained from a tree. All the faces of batá have this substance apart from the face that is called Ako; this face gives the highest tone in the drum.
6) Bulala: This is also made of thick leather. It is used to play the drum. Nowadays, flexible plastics are being cut to look like leather bulala. These flexible plastics can also be used to play the drum.
7) Cowry: This is always inserted into batá drums. People call it AYAN.
