= Gavilan College =

Community college in Gilroy, California, US

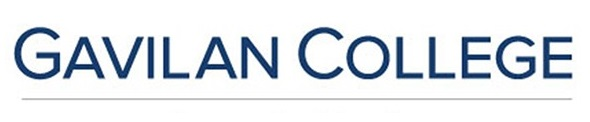
- Former name: San Benito County Junior College (1919–1963)
- Type: Public community college
- Established: 1919
- Parent institution: CCCS
- President: Pedro Avila
- Students: 6,833 (2026)
- Location: Gilroy, California, U.S. 36°58′25″N 121°34′08″W
- Campus: Suburban
- Colors: Navy blue, red, and white
- Nickname: Gavilan Rams
- Website: www.gavilan.edu

Gavilan College is a public community college in Santa Clara County, California.

== History ==
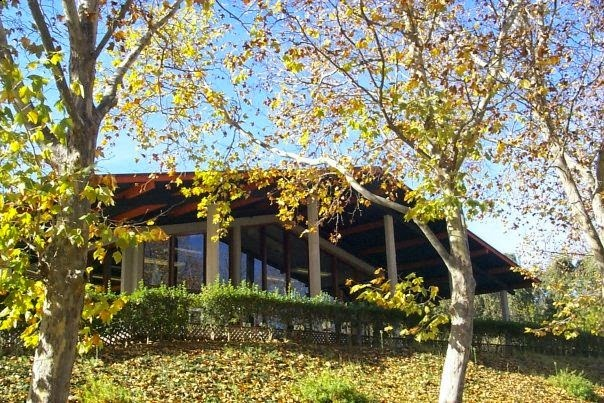
Gavilan College's Gilroy campus, in the foothills of the Santa Cruz Mountains

The college was established in 1919 as the San Benito County Junior College. It operated as such until 1963, when a new community college district was drawn that included both San Benito County and southern Santa Clara County. The college moved to its present main campus in 1968.

== Campus ==
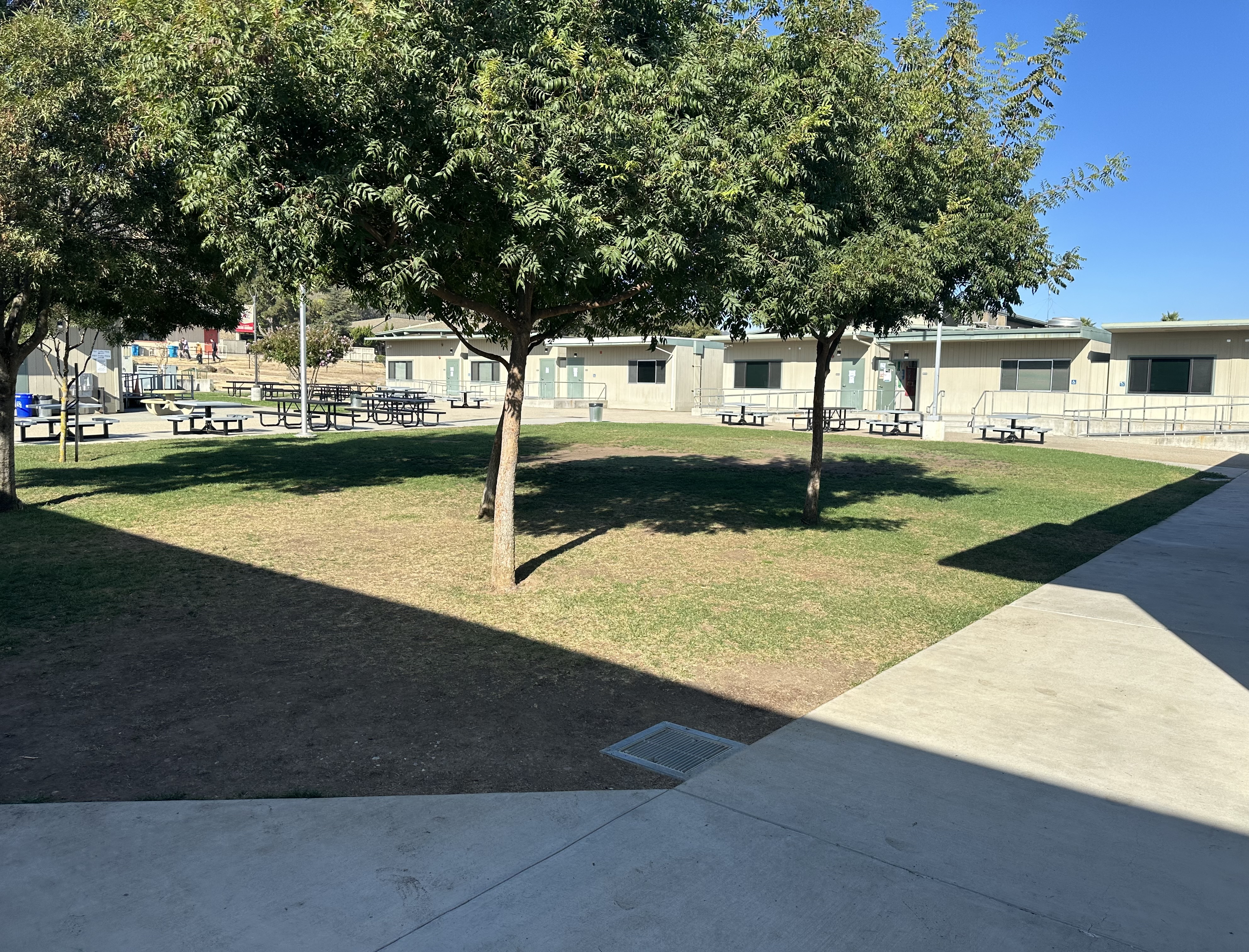
Part of the Gilroy Early College Academy campus

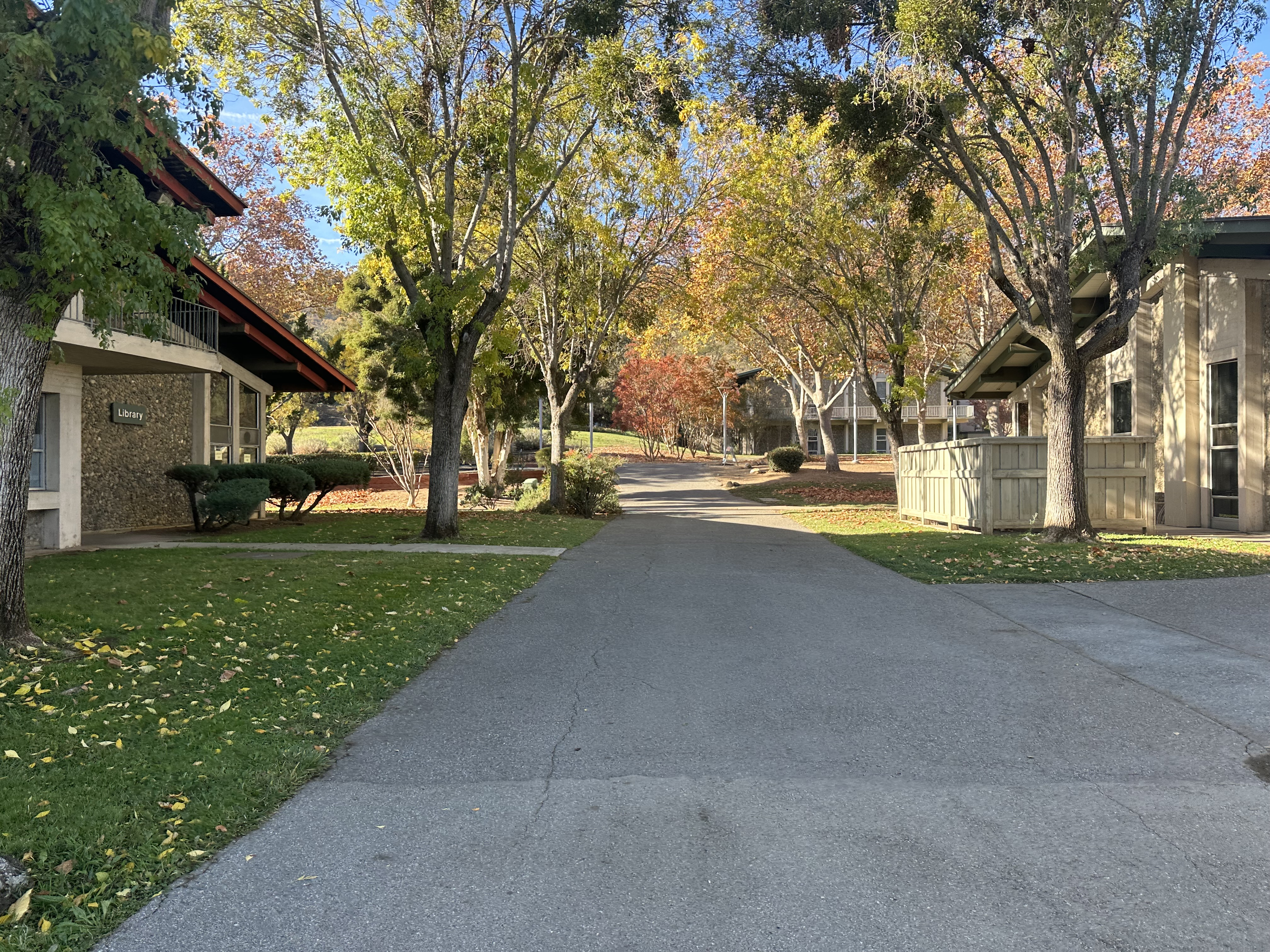
Part of the Gilroy campus of Gavilan College in 2024

The main campus is located in unincorporated Santa Clara County near Gilroy, California. In 1997, satellite sites were added in Hollister and Morgan Hill to augment offerings on the main campus. In 2008, land was purchased in Coyote Valley and San Benito County for the future development of additional campuses. In 2017, Phase 1 of the Coyote Valley Center was completed, becoming Gavilan's newest instructional site and the home for South Bay Public Safety Training Consortium police and fire academies. In 2025, Phase 1 of the new Hollister campus, located in unincorporated San Benito County east of Hollister, opened for classes.

As of 2026, classes are mainly offered at the Gilroy and Hollister campuses. In addition, aviation technology classes are offered at the San Martin Airport and public safety and law enforcement classes are offered at the Coyote Valley Center.

== Academics ==
Gavilan College offers Associate of Arts and Associate of Science degrees, and certificates in a variety of career fields. Gavilan College is also the only community college in northern California offering degree and certificate programs in Aviation Maintenance Technology.

== Gilroy Early College Academy ==
Gavilan College hosts an early college high school, Dr. TJ Owens Gilroy Early College Academy (GECA), on its Gilroy campus. Founded in 2007, GECA students are able to complete two years of college in their four years of high school by taking advanced placement and honors classes, as well as Gavilan College courses alongside Gavilan students, and can graduate with an associate degree.

== Student life ==
Fine and performing arts opportunities include theater, children's theater, gallery art, mural art, ceramics, Folklorico dance, choir, instrumental ensemble, symphony, and vocal ensemble.

=== Athletics ===
The Gavilan College athletic teams are called the Rams. Intercollegiate sports include men's football, baseball, basketball, and soccer, and women's basketball, softball, volleyball and beach volleyball. Their mascot is the Ram.

=== Student diversity ===
- African American: 3%
- Asian American: 7%
- Hispanic: 43%
- International: 0%
- Native American: 1%
- White: 36%
- Unknown: 9%

== Notable alumni & faculty ==
- Luis Alejo, former California State Assemblyman and Mayor of Watsonville
- Jeff Garcia, professional football player
- Bob Kampa, professional football player
- Debbie Klein, Fulbright scholar
- Frank LaCorte, professional baseball player
- Louis A. Mackey, professional football player
- Jeff Ulbrich, professional football player
- Josh Wallwork, college football player
