= Gilroy Unified School District =

School district in California, United States

Address
- 7810 Arroyo Circle Gilroy, California, 95020; United States

District information
- Type: Public
- Motto: Excellence: It Takes Everyone!
- Grades: Preschool - 12th Grade
- President: Tuyen Fiack
- Vice-president: Michelle Nelson
- Superintendent: Anisha Munshi
- Schools: 14
- Budget: $115 million
- NCES District ID: 0615180

Students and staff
- Students: 10,821 (2020–2021)
- Teachers: 452.08 (FTE)
- Staff: 495.69 (FTE)
- Student–teacher ratio: 23.94:1

Other information
- Website: www.gilroyunified.org

Gilroy Unified School District is located in the southernmost tip of Santa Clara Valley, California.

The Gilroy Unified School District was created in 1966 when several small school districts joined with the Gilroy School District. The other school districts included San Ysidro and Rucker. It covers an area of over 600 square miles, and during the 2012–2013 school year had approximately 11,000 students.

The school district currently consists of two comprehensive high schools (Gilroy High School and Christopher High School), an early college academy (Gilroy Early College Academy), a continuation high school (Mt. Madonna Continuation High School), three middle schools (Brownell, Solorsano, and South Valley), and seven elementary schools (El Roble, Eliot, Glen View, Las Animas, Luigi Aprea, Rod Kelley, and Rucker). The district also operates a preschool program and an adult education program.

One charter school, Gilroy Prep School, has been chartered by the school board and opened in 2011 serving students grades TK-8.

== Awards and recognition ==
=== Christopher High School ===
- 2015 California Gold Ribbon School

=== Gilroy High School ===
- 1994 and 2009 California Distinguished School
- 2026 California Exemplary Arts Education Award

=== Gilroy Early College Academy ===
- 2021 National Blue Ribbon School
- 2015 California Gold Ribbon School
- 2013, 2019, 2024, and 2026 California Distinguished School

=== Mt. Madonna Continuation High School ===
- 2015 California Model Continuation High School

=== Ascencion Solorsano Middle School ===
- 2007 and 2013 California Distinguished School
- 2007 Title I Academic Achievement School

=== Brownell Middle School ===
- 2015 California Gold Ribbon School

=== Glen View Elementary School ===
- 1997 California Distinguished School

=== Las Animas Elementary School ===
- 2016 California Gold Ribbon Schools Award
- 2008 California Distinguished School
- 2009 Title I Academic Achievement School

=== Rod Kelley Elementary School ===
- 2016 California Gold Ribbon Schools Award

== Schools ==
=== High Schools ===
- Gilroy High School
- Christopher High School
- Dr. TJ Owens Gilroy Early College Academy (GECA)
- Mt. Madonna Continuation High School

=== Middle Schools ===
- South Valley Middle School
- Brownell Middle School
- Ascencion Solorsano Middle School

=== Elementary Schools ===
- Rucker Elementary School
- Eliot Elementary School
- Glen View Elementary School
- Las Animas Elementary School
- Luigi Aprea Elementary School
- El Roble Elementary School
- Rod Kelley Elementary School

== Board of education ==
Gilroy Unified is overseen by a publicly elected seven member board of education, elected for four year terms. Among its duties, this body appoints the superintendent to function as the district's chief executive for carrying out day-to-day decisions and policy implementations.

The term for these trustees ends in 2026:

- Gabriela Kim
- Michelle Nelson
- Linda Piceno
- Tuyen Fiack

The term for these trustees expires in 2028:

- Hyon Chu Yi-Baker
- Kenny Moreno
- Jennifer Del Bono
