= 2019 Fresno shooting =

Mass shooting in California, U.S.

- Location: 36.7608°N 119.7156°W; 5361 E Lamona Ave; Fresno, California, US
- Date: November 17, 2019; 6:00 p.m. (PST; UTC−08:00)
- Attack type: Mass shooting
- Deaths: 4
- Injuries: 6
- Accused: 6

On November 17, 2019, a mass shooting occurred at a Fresno, California, United States, football watch party with 35 to 40 attendees where four people were fatally shot and six others were injured.

== Incident ==
The shooting happened in a backyard of a home when a group of friends and families were holding a football watch party, to watch the game between the Los Angeles Rams and the Chicago Bears. The party was composed of about 35 to 40 friends and family members of the home owner in attendance. At some point during the party the women and children attending the party had moved inside to watch TV, while 16 men stayed outside to continue watching the football game. At least two suspects snuck through an unlocked gate of the home around 6:00 pm PST and opened fire indiscriminately before they fled on foot.

== Victims ==
The deceased victims were all men between the ages of 23 and 40 years old. Three men were pronounced dead at the scene while another was transported to Community Regional Medical Center where he died of his injuries. Two of the deceased were well-known Southeast Asian singers.

Five others were treated with non-life-threatening wounds at the same hospital while another was treated at a different hospital. The surviving victims are men between the ages of 28 and 36. All of the victims are members of the Hmong community in Fresno. The Fresno area is home to the largest Hmong population in California and the second-largest in the United States. Their community expressed sadness and bewilderment.

== Investigation ==
The Fresno Police Department is investigating the incident, with assistance from the U.S. Bureau of Alcohol, Tobacco, Firearms and Explosives and Clovis Police Department. Fresno Police Deputy Chief Michael Reed said the victims were "likely targeted". The department mobilized an "Asian Gang Task Force" to look into concerns about the attack being connected to a recent spike in violent crime by Asian gangs.

On December 31, six suspects were arrested in connection with the shooting, all of whom were believed to have been members of the Mongolian Boys Society gang. One of the victims was a former member of the rival gang Asian Crips. The shooting was allegedly retaliation for the murder of a Mongolian Boys Society member by a member of the Asian Crips. The suspects were detained at the Fresno County Jail and faced four counts of homicide, 12 counts of attempted homicide, and conspiracy to commit murder with gang and firearms enhancements. In February 2020, a seventh suspect was arrested and charged with the same offenses. In January 2022, the prosecution announced it plans to pursue the death penalty against three of the suspects. On June 16, 2024, one of the suspects, Porge Kue, was found unresponsive in the county jail, and he was taken to a Fresno hospital, where he died on June 20. It is believed that he was not killed by a fellow inmate, and it is suspected that he died of a drug overdose, but the investigation is still ongoing and no cause of death has been confirmed.

== See also ==
- List of homicides in California
- List of mass shootings in the United States in 2019
- Orinda shooting
- Mass shootings in the United States
- List of mass shootings in the United States
