= List of mass shootings in the United States in 2019 =

Mass shootings in the United States in 2019
Mass shootings in Hawaii in 2019
Mass shootings in Puerto Rico in 2019
Mass shootings in the United States Virgin Islands in 2019

This is a list of mass shootings in the United States that have occurred in 2019. Mass shootings are incidents involving multiple victims of firearm-related violence. The precise inclusion criteria are disputed, and there is no broadly accepted definition.

Gun Violence Archive, a nonprofit research group that tracks shootings and their characteristics in the United States, defines a mass shooting as an incident in which four or more people, excluding the perpetrator(s), are shot in one location at roughly the same time. The Congressional Research Service narrows that definition, limiting it to "public mass shootings," defined by four or more victims killed, excluding any victims who survive. The Washington Post and Mother Jones use similar definitions, with the latter acknowledging that their definition "is a conservative measure of the problem," as many shootings with fewer fatalities occur. The crowdsourced Mass Shooting Tracker project has the most expansive definition, of four or more shot in any incident, including the perpetrator.

There were 434 mass shootings in 2019 that fit the inclusion criteria of this article, resulting in 517 deaths and 1,643 injuries, for a total of 2,160 victims. Compared to the previous year, there were 111 more incidents.

== Definitions ==
There are many definitions of a mass shooting. Listed roughly from broad to specific:

Mass Shooting Criteria
Source	Persons shot	Count is wounded or killed?	Count includes perpetrator(s)	Other conditions	Reference
Stanford University MSA Data Project	3	wounded	No	one location, roughly the same time, excluding organized crime, gangs, drug wars	
Mass Shooting Tracker	4	wounded	Yes	one location, roughly the same time	
Gun Violence Archive/Vox	4	wounded	No	one location, roughly the same time	
Mother Jones	3	killed	No	at a public place	
The Washington Post	4	killed	No	at a public place	
ABC News/FBI	4	killed	No	one location, roughly the same time	
Congressional Research Service	4	killed	No	at a public place, excluding gang-related killings and those done with a profit-motive.	

Only incidents considered mass shootings by at least two of the above sources are listed below.

== List ==
A number n in brackets indicates that it was the nth mass shooting in that community in the year.

Date	Community	State	Dead	Injured	Total	Description
December 29, 2019	Ceres	California	0	5	5	Five people were shot outside a home after returning from a bar in Modesto where they had been involved in an altercation.
December 29, 2019	Danville	Illinois	0	5	5	Five women aged 18 to 32 years old were injured by gunfire after the home they were in was shot at by an unknown person.
December 29, 2019	Buffalo (2)	New York	1	3	4	After an argument escalated on a front porch, four people were wounded by gunfire, with one man dying later at the hospital.
December 27, 2019	Houston (10)	Texas	2	7	9	Two people were killed and seven injured in a drive-by shooting at a music video set.
December 27, 2019	Kennesaw	Georgia	0	4	4	Officers responding to a call about an individual shot arrived at a house party and found four teenagers injured.
December 27, 2019	Modesto	California	1	3	4	Officers responding to a call of suspicious circumstances near an intersection found one man killed and two others and a woman injured.
December 26, 2019	St. Petersburg	Florida	0	5	5	Five people were wounded by gunfire outside a night club, with an additional three injured by the resulting building damage and chaos. The shooting occurred after an altercation escalated out onto the street.
December 25, 2019	Coralville	Iowa	1	3	4	Police responding to reports of shots fired discovered four wounded victims, one of which died later at the hospital.
December 25, 2019	Richmond (2)	Virginia	1	3	4	One person was killed and three injured in a shooting outside a bar, after an earlier argument in a restaurant.
December 25, 2019	Oakland (5)	California	0	4	4	Four people wounded by gunfire were discovered by police after responding to a house party.
December 24, 2019	High Point	North Carolina	0	6	6	Six people were wounded in a shooting in which the perpetrator was believed to have exited a vehicle and opened fire before leaving in it.
December 24, 2019	New Orleans (9)	Louisiana	0	4	4	Shooters wearing ski masks exited a vehicle and wounded four people before fleeing.
December 22, 2019	Chicago (31)	Illinois	0	13	13	Thirteen people were shot at a party that was held to memorialize a victim of an earlier shooting, at least one was a teenager.
December 22, 2019	Baltimore (16)	Maryland	0	7	7	Seven people were wounded in an early morning shooting, including two 17-year-olds.
December 21, 2019	Waynesbroro	Mississippi	1	6	7	One person was killed and six injured in an apartment complex after a drive-by shooting.
December 20, 2019	Winston-Salem (3)	North Carolina	2 (Note: Including the perpetrator(s) or suspect(s))	2	4	Two people were killed and a police officer and bystander injured at the local Sanitation Department after a fight escalated.
December 20, 2019	Tuskegee	Alabama	2	2	4	Two people were killed and two were injured in a late night double homicide.
December 19, 2019	Westerly	Rhode Island	2	2	4	A resident at Babcock Village Apartments shot two employees, one fatally, and one resident before killing himself.
December 18, 2019	San Antonio (5)	Texas	0	4	4	Four people were shot at the South Park Mall.
December 17, 2019	Great Falls	Montana	4	1	5	Three people are killed and one wounded in a shooting at the Emerald City Casino. The suspect was later killed by police at a different location.
December 15, 2019	Columbus	Georgia	1	4	5	One man was killed and four others injured at an intersection early in the morning.
December 14, 2019	Ivanhoe	California	0	4	4	Four teenagers were wounded in a drive-by shooting at an apartment complex.
December 12, 2019	St. Louis (8)	Missouri	1	3	4	One man was killed and three wounded in a business parking lot.
December 10, 2019	Jersey City (3)	New Jersey	6	3	9	2019 Jersey City shooting: Four people were killed, including a police officer, and another three were injured in an ambush style shootout by a man and woman who were killed by police. The suspects were Black Hebrew Israelites members and targeted a kosher grocery store.
December 10, 2019	Edinburg	Texas	4	0	4	Four people were discovered dead in a home, in either by a murder-suicide or a quadruple homicide. A toddler was also in the home, unharmed.
December 8, 2019	Desoto	Texas	2	3	5	Two men were killed and three injured at an apartment building. The incident was originally reported as a home invasion, although the account was not confirmed.
December 8, 2019	New Orleans (8)	Louisiana	1	4	5	Five people were shot outside a local bar, with one man dying of his injuries at the hospital.
December 6, 2019	Pensacola	Florida	4	8	12	Naval Air Station Pensacola shooting: A man killed three individuals and injured eight more at Naval Air Station Pensacola before being killed by police. A terrorist motive is suspected to be behind the attack.
December 5, 2019	Miramar	Florida	4	1	5	2019 Miramar shootout: Four people are dead and one injured after a pair of men rob a jewelry store in Coral Gables, injuring the clerk, then carjack a UPS truck and lead police on a chase that ended in a shootout in Miramar that killed the UPS driver, a bystander, and the suspects.
December 4, 2019	Honolulu County	Hawaii	3	1	4	22-year-old Gabriel Romero, a US Navy sailor and submarine crewman, randomly opened fire just minutes after starting his shift for routine guard duty at Joint Base Pearl Harbor–Hickam. He opened fire on a group of civilian workers, killing two and wounded another, before immediately shooting himself. The motive is thought to be a toxic cultural environment in the USN, particularly among submarine crewman.
December 4, 2019	Montgomery (2)	Alabama	2	2	4	Two people were killed and two wounded in an apartment complex.
December 1, 2019	Comstock Township	Michigan	1	3	4	One person was killed and three police officers wounded when a home invasion turned into a hostage situation.
December 1, 2019	Cotton Valley	Louisiana	2	3 (Note: Including at least one of the perpetrators or suspects)	5	One woman was killed and three others wounded, including one of the two perpetrators, after an argument escalated at a nightclub.
December 1, 2019	New Orleans (7)	Louisiana	2	2	4	Two people were killed and two injured at an intersection hours after the first mass shooting in the city.
December 1, 2019	Aurora (2)	Illinois	1	4	5	One person was killed and four were injured in a shooting in Aurora, Illinois.
December 1, 2019	New Orleans (6)	Louisiana	0	10	10	2019 New Orleans shooting: Ten people were shot in a densely populated area with heavy police presence at a time when tens of thousands of tourists were downtown for the Bayou Classic football game.
November 29, 2019	Amarillo	Texas	0	7	7	Seven people were shot at a nightclub in the early morning.
November 27, 2019	New York City (6)	New York	0	5	5	Five people were wounded including two children aged 10 and 15.
November 25, 2019	Brownsville	Florida	2	2	4	Two men were killed and two others wounded in a drive-by shooting. One suspect was arrested after the car crashed into a parked police car.
November 24, 2019	Los Angeles (8)	California	0	6	6	Six people were wounded at a warehouse party after an argument escalated and the perpetrator opened fire.
November 24, 2019	Cottonport	Louisiana	2	2	4	Two people were killed and two others injured in an early morning shooting at a club.
November 24, 2019	Birmingham (4)	Alabama	1	4	5	One person was killed and four others injured in a drive-by shooting after being made to leave a club following an argument.
November 23, 2019	Tallulah	Louisiana	1	6	7	One person was killed and six injured after an argument at a club escalated and the perpetrator began to fire randomly.
November 23, 2019	Los Angeles (7)	California	0	4	4	Four people were wounded at an outdoor party after a fight broke out.
November 21, 2019	Long Beach (3)	California	0	5	5	Five people were wounded randomly as a man drove down a road and opened fire on pedestrians.
November 21, 2019	Everett	Washington	0	4	4	Four people were wounded in an apartment complex during a large gathering.
November 20, 2019	Richmond (2)	California	0	4	4	Four people were wounded in a shooting.
November 18, 2019	Newark (3)	New Jersey	1	3	4	One person was killed and three people were injured in two homes on one street.
November 17, 2019	Fresno (2)	California	4	6	10	2019 Fresno shooting: Ten people were shot, four fatally, at a football watch party.
November 17, 2019	Cleveland (4)	Ohio	0	4	4	Four people were wounded outside a home by a drive-by shooting.
November 16, 2019	San Diego (2)	California	5	1	6	A man killed his estranged wife and their three children, wounding a fourth child, before killing himself.
November 14, 2019	Santa Clarita	California	3	3	6	2019 Saugus High School shooting: A high school student shot five classmates, two fatally, before shooting himself; he died the next day in the hospital.
November 11, 2019	Belle Glade	Florida	0	4	4	Four people were shot randomly along a road.
November 10, 2019	Kansas City (4)	Missouri	0	4	4	Four people were wounded outside a night club after a disturbance escalated.
November 10, 2019	Memphis (4)	Tennessee	1	4	5	A woman was killed and four others were wounded during an early morning shooting at a strip club.
November 10, 2019	Little Rock (2)	Arkansas	0	4	4	An adult male and three children, aged 12 through 13-years-old, were wounded by an unknown perpetrator while filming a rap music video.
November 9, 2019	Vidalia	Georgia	0	4	4	Two vehicles were shot at, wounding three adults and a 10-year-old child.
November 9, 2019	Detroit (4)	Michigan	0	4	4	Four men were wounded in a drive-by shooting in a parking lot.
November 7, 2019	Sumter (3)	South Carolina	1	3	4	Two suspects exchanged gunfire with people inside a house linked to illegal gambling and alcohol sales. One of the suspects was killed, and three other people were injured.
November 7, 2019	Conyers	Georgia	2	3	5	An argument escalated and left one man injured and another dead. The shooter then engaged in a shootout with officers injuring two officers before being killed.
November 6, 2019	Eugene	Oregon	1	3	4	A man shot and wounded three neighbors after a dispute over them blowing leaves into his yard. He returned to his house and killed himself.
November 4, 2019	Houston (9)	Texas	1	3	4	A man was killed and three other people were injured when a person opened fire at a group in a driveway.
November 3, 2019	Toledo (2)	Ohio	0	4	4	Officers responding to a Shotspotter alert found four people wounded at a nightclub.
November 3, 2019	Nacogdoches	Texas	1	3	4	A man shot at five men working on a barn, killing one and injured three others.
November 2, 2019	Detroit (3)	Michigan	1	4	5	One person was killed and five injured at an after hours party.
November 2, 2019	Baton Rouge (3)	Louisiana	0	4	4	Four people were wounded in a shooting.
November 1, 2019	Tolleson	Arizona	0	5	5	Five teenagers were wounded at a Halloween party in a vacant home.
November 1, 2019	San Angelo	Texas	0	4	4	Four people were wounded in a drive-by shooting outside a night club.
October 31, 2019	Orinda	California	5	4	9	Orinda shooting: At an overnight Halloween party attended by over 100 people, five people were killed, and four more wounded by gunfire.
October 29, 2019	Long Beach (2)	California	3	9	12	Three men were killed and nine injured at a Halloween party at a residential home.
October 28, 2019	Baltimore (15)	Maryland	1	3	4	A man was killed and two adults and a 17-year-old were injured in front of a store.
October 27, 2019	Detroit (2)	Michigan	0	4	4	Four men were injured in a random drive by shooting.
October 27, 2019	Lansing	Michigan	1	4	5	One man was killed and four others were injured at a house party.
October 27, 2019	Greenville	Texas	2	10	12	Two men were killed and ten others injured at a large party to celebrate Texas A&M University's homecoming weekend.
October 26, 2019	Jersey City (2)	New Jersey	0	4	4	Four people were wounded in a late night shooting.
October 24, 2019	Oklahoma City (3)	Oklahoma	2	2	4	Two people were killed and two injured at a home late at night.
October 22, 2019	Oklahoma City (2)	Oklahoma	1	3	4	One person was killed and three wounded at an apartment complex late at night.
October 21, 2019	Sumter (2)	South Carolina	0	4	4	Four people were shot at random and wounded by a lone gunman.
October 20, 2019	Port Arthur	Texas	1	3	4	A woman was killed and three others injured in an early morning shooting.
October 19, 2019	Duquesne	Pennsylvania	0	4	4	Four people were shot in a drive-by shooting.
October 19, 2019	El Paso (2)	Texas	1	3	4	One man was killed and two others and a woman were injured in an early morning shooting.
October 15, 2019	Miami	Oklahoma	2	2 (Note: Including a pregnant individual)	4	A man killed his 11-year-old daughter and wounded her mother and the mother's boyfriend before committing suicide.
October 15, 2019	Columbus (4)	Ohio	0	4	4	Three teenagers and an adult male were injured while sitting on a porch.
October 14, 2019	San Juan	Puerto Rico	6	0	6	2019 Río Piedras shooting: Six people were killed in a shootout at a housing project.
October 14, 2019	Philadelphia (11)	Pennsylvania	3	1	4	A woman killed her two children and her husband before attempting to commit suicide.
October 13, 2019	Akron (2)	Ohio	0	4	4	One woman and three men were wounded outside a bar.
October 13, 2019	Philadelphia (10)	Pennsylvania	0	6	6	A 14-year-old boy and five men were wounded while standing on the street.
October 12, 2019	New York City (5)	New York	4	3	7	Four people were killed and three injured at a social club.
October 12, 2019	Crosby	Texas	0	4	4	Four men were wounded after a brawl near a gas station.
October 12, 2019	Baltimore (14)	Maryland	1	3	4	A man was killed and three others injured.
October 12, 2019	Chicago (30)	Illinois	5	0	5	Four people were killed and one injured after a neighbor entered their apartment and opened fire. The fifth victim died of her injuries later in hospital.
October 12, 2019	Eastpointe	Michigan	1	5	6	One person was killed and five injured after an argument escalated in a local bar.
October 10, 2019	Philadelphia (9)	Pennsylvania	0	5	5	Five men were wounded after a driver was angered over a game of dice.
October 10, 2019	Milwaukee (2)	Wisconsin	1	3	4	A man was killed while another man and two children, ages 10 and 14, were wounded.
October 10, 2019	Tampa	Florida	2	2	4	Two people were killed and two wounded at a mobile home.
October 9, 2019	Baltimore (13)	Maryland	1	3	4	A man was killed and three other individuals, including a 15-year-old boy, were injured.
October 7, 2019	Abington	Massachusetts	5	0	5	A family of five, two adults and three children, were found shot to death in their home in an apparent murder-suicide.
October 6, 2019	Denver (2)	Colorado	0	4	4	An argument escalated during a large gathering outside a home, and four people were wounded.
October 6, 2019	Kansas City	Kansas	4	5	9	Four people were killed and another five people wounded in a shooting at a bar.
October 6, 2019	Evansville (2)	Indiana	0	5	5	An argument inside of an American Legion bar escalated, and five men were shot as they left the bar.
October 5, 2019	Lawton	Oklahoma	4	0	4	Two adults and two children were discovered dead in a home.
October 3, 2019	Marshall	Missouri	1	3	4	Three people were wounded and a fourth later died at the hospital in a shooting.
October 3, 2019	Roxboro	North Carolina	1	3	4	A man was killed and three others wounded.
October 1, 2019	St. Louis (7)	Missouri	0	4	4	Four men were wounded after two cars drove by a crowd of people and opened fire.
September 29, 2019	Clafin	Kansas	0	4	4	Four people were wounded after an individual fired a shotgun towards a group of people at a house party.
September 29, 2019	Jacksonville (5)	Florida	0	4	4	Four people were injured while attending a large party after an individual fired into the air.
September 29, 2019	Milwaukee (1)	Wisconsin	0	4	4	Four young women were injured after an individual fired into a home were a house party was being held.
September 29, 2019	Round Lake	Illinois	1	3	4	A man was killed and three injured after unknown individuals attempted to crash a house party and began shooting.
September 29, 2019	Beaumont	Texas	4	0	4	Four men were shot and killed at an apartment complex after a disturbance between roommates escalated. The shooter was sentenced to life in 2022.
September 27, 2019	Seaman	Ohio	3	1	4	A man killed his mother then drove to a gas station where he attempted to kidnap a clerk then killed a man and injured the clerk before robbing another gas station and committing suicide.
September 24, 2019	Chicago (29)	Illinois	1	3	4	A 17-year-old boy was killed and three adults were injured in the Lower West Side.
September 23, 2019	Gary	Indiana	2	2	4	Two men were killed and a woman and man injured in an early morning shooting.
September 22, 2019	Independence	Missouri	0	5	5	Five people were wounded at The SPOTT Lifestyle and Swingers Club.
September 21, 2019	New Orleans (5)	Louisiana	0	4	4	Four people were wounded after shot were fired into their car.
September 21, 2019	Indianapolis (5)	Indiana	0	6	6	Three adults and three juveniles were injured after a fight escalated.
September 21, 2019	Lancaster	South Carolina	2	8	10	Ten people were shot, two fatally, during a bar fight that escalated.
September 21, 2019	South Bend (2)	Indiana	1	3	4	A man was killed and three women injured in an early morning shooting.
September 20, 2019	New Orleans (4)	Louisiana	1	5	6	Six people were shot, one fatally, at an intersection in the Mid-City Area.
September 19, 2019	Washington (7)	District of Columbia	1	5	6	A man was killed, and four others and a woman injured, in a possible drive-by in the Columbia Heights District.
September 18, 2019	Chicago (28)	Illinois	3	1	4	Three men were killed and one injured after an argument about cigarettes escalated outside a West Garfield Park convenience store.
September 18, 2019	Los Angeles (6)	California	2	2	4	A man and woman were killed, and two other women injured, in the Wilmington neighborhood after an individual shot into a crowd of people.
September 16, 2019	Cheyenne	Wyoming	2	2	4	Two adults killed, two juveniles injured in east Cheyenne shooting.
September 14, 2019	LaGrange	Georgia	0	4	4	Four individuals were wounded after an individual opened fire.
September 14, 2019	St. Louis (6)	Missouri	2	2	4	Responding police officers discovered a car covered in gunshots, and discovered a deceased male and two men and a female injured. One of the injured men later died.
September 14, 2019	Oakland (4)	California	1	4	5	An argument escalated between two men outside a Laurel District bar, leading to a man killed and three men and a woman injured.
September 13, 2019	Cincinnati	Ohio	0	4	4	A feud between two men led to four people being injured after it escalated in the North Fairmont neighborhood.
September 12, 2019	Albuquerque (3)	New Mexico	1	3	4	One person was killed and three others injured at a local apartment complex.
September 12, 2019	Albuquerque (2)	New Mexico	4	2	6	Two adults, a 16-year-old girl, and a 17-year-old boy were killed and two others injured in a mobile home park.
September 10, 2019	Chicago (27)	Illinois	0	4	4	Three young adult males and a 17-year-old boy were injured in the back of a house in the West Town neighborhood.
September 8, 2019	Alexandria (2)	Louisiana	1	3	4	A woman shot and killed one woman and injured three others after a continuation of an argument escalated.
September 8, 2019	Sumter (1)	South Carolina	2	3	5	Two men were killed and three other individuals injured at a local convenience store, in the early morning.
September 7, 2019	Whiteville	North Carolina	3	1	4	A husband, wife and their five-year-old son were killed while the grandmother was injured in a targeted attack.
September 6, 2019	Saint Croix	United States Virgin Islands	0	4	4	Four people were shot at a housing community.
September 4, 2019	Marrero	Louisiana	2	2	4	A man and a seven-year-old girl were killed, and another man and a 11-year-old boy were injured after an argument apparently escalated.
September 4, 2019	Jacksonville (4)	Florida	0	4	4	Three adults and a child were wounded in a shooting.
September 2, 2019	Elkmont	Alabama	5	0	5	A 14-year-old boy shot dead five family members – two adults and three children – in an Alabama residence. He confessed the crime to the police. The perpetrator was sentenced to life in 2023.
September 2, 2019	Chicago (26)	Illinois	0	4	4	Four men were wounded in a drive-by shooting outside of a CTA Green Line station in Washington Park.
September 2, 2019	Greensboro	North Carolina	2	2	4	Two men were killed and a woman and small child injured during a home invasion.
September 1, 2019	Rocky Mount	North Carolina	0	4	4	Four people were shot at a private party at a Moose Lodge.
September 1, 2019	Valley	Alabama	0	7	7	Six adult males and a 15-year-old boy were wounded outside a kindergarten after an argument over a Lanett vs. Lafayette football game escalated.
September 1, 2019	Hartford (2)	Connecticut	0	4	4	Three men and a 17-year-old boy were wounded in a shooting.
September 1, 2019	Toledo (1)	Ohio	0	4	4	Four people were found shot in the early morning.
August 31, 2019	Odessa and Midland	Texas	8	25	33	Midland–Odessa shooting: Eight people were killed, including the perpetrator, and 25 were wounded when a gunman opened fire on police and civilians after fleeing from a traffic stop.
August 31, 2019	Charlotte (4)	North Carolina	1	3	4	A man was killed and three others were injured at a University of North Carolina at Charlotte off-campus apartment complex.
August 31, 2019	Frederick	Maryland	0	4	4	Four people were injured after an argument escalated.
August 30, 2019	Mobile (2)	Alabama	0	10	10	Ten people, ranging in age from 15 to 18, were injured at a high school football game after a fight escalated.
August 30, 2019	Baltimore (12)	Maryland	1	3	4	A woman was killed and three others were injured in a possible retaliation to a previous stabbing.
August 29, 2019	Baltimore (11)	Maryland	1	3	4	A 16-year-old boy was killed, while two teen boys – a 14-year-old and 15-year-old – and an adult woman were injured.
August 26, 2019	Pembroke Falls	Florida	4	0	4	A man killed his wife, mother-in-law, and one of his three-year-old twin daughters before committing suicide.
August 25, 2019	Chicago (25)	Illinois	1	3	4	A 17-year-old boy was killed and three adults were wounded after a large group was fired upon.
August 25, 2019	Hobbs*	New Mexico	3	4	7	Hobbs, New Mexico party shooting Police responded to a party due to a shots fired call and found three dead and four wounded.
August 24, 2019	Lynn	Massachusetts	1	3	4	A man was killed and three were injured while attending a basketball tournament.
August 24, 2019	Coconut Creek	Florida	2	3	5	Two people were killed and three were injured, including a police officer, in a shooting. A suspect was apprehended.
August 24, 2019	Temple	Maryland	0	7	7	Seven people were wounded at a two-year-old's birthday party after a fight escalated.
August 23, 2019	St. Louis (5)	Missouri	1	3	4	An eight-year-old girl was killed and three others were wounded in a shooting near Soldan High School.
August 23, 2019	Houston (8)	Texas	2	2	4	Two men were killed and a man and woman were injured in a drive-by shooting.
August 22, 2019	Columbia (2)	South Carolina	2	2	4	A man opened fire on patrons at a bar, killing two and wounding two others, after being kicked out.
August 22, 2019	Los Angeles (5)	California	0	4	4	Four people, including a social worker and a security guard were wounded in the Skid Row district.
August 20, 2019	Atlanta (6)	Georgia	0	4	4	Four female students from Clark Atlanta University and Spelman College were wounded during a block party.
August 18, 2019	Kansas City (3)	Missouri	0	4	4	Four teenagers were wounded after an argument escalated during a gathering in a hotel room.
August 17, 2019	Houston (7)	Texas	0	7	7	Seven people were injured in a shooting at a party.
August 17, 2019	Kansas City (2)	Missouri	0	4	4	Police responded to a shooting call and discovered four people wounded.
August 17, 2019	Newport News	Virginia	1	3	4	A woman was killed, and responding officers engaged with the suspect causing an officer, bystander and the suspect to be wounded.
August 15, 2019	Philadelphia (8)	Pennsylvania	0	5	5	Four men and a teenage boy were wounded.
August 15, 2019	Montgomery (1)	Alabama	2	3	5	Two people were killed and three wounded in a shooting near Alabama State University.
August 14, 2019	New Manchester	West Virginia	1	5 (Note: Two injured by shrapnel from shots fired at or into the residence)	6	A man killed his girlfriend and injured five others and a dog before being wounded by police and arrested.
August 14, 2019	Philadelphia (7)	Pennsylvania	0	6	6	Six Philadelphia Police officers were shot during an eight-hour standoff while attempting to serve a drug warrant.
August 13, 2019	Tacoma	Washington	2	3	5	Police responded to calls of shots fired and found a deceased male and three women wounded. One died at the hospital from their injuries.
August 13, 2019	Greenwood	Mississippi	0	4	4	Four people were wounded in a shooting.
August 12, 2019	Riverside	California	2	2	4	A police officer was killed and two were wounded after a suspect opened fire during a traffic stop. The suspect was killed by police.
August 12, 2019	Hickory	North Carolina	3	1	4	A man shot and killed his estranged wife and a man, then wounded another man before committing suicide.
August 11, 2019	Chicago (24)	Illinois	0	6	6	Six people were injured when they were shot by a gunman in a car in Garfield Park.
August 10, 2019	San Francisco (2)	California	0	4	4	Four people were injured in an overnight shooting in the parking lot of a McDonald's restaurant.
August 10, 2019	Richmond (1)	Virginia	0	4	4	Four people were injured in a shooting.
August 9, 2019	Houston (6)	Texas	0	4	4	Four men were injured during a shoot-out at a convenience store.
August 9, 2019	Chicago (23)	Illinois	0	4	4	Four people were injured in a drive-by shooting in Marquette Park.
August 8, 2019	Irvington	New Jersey	2	3	5	A gunman wearing body armor killed another man and wounded three responding police officers before being killed by the officers.
August 7, 2019	St. Louis (4)	Missouri	2	2	4	Two people were killed and two were injured in a shooting that also involved a motor vehicle crash.
August 6, 2019	Stone Mountain	Georgia	4	0	4	A man killed two women and a man before killing himself in a triple murder–suicide.
August 6, 2019	Detroit (1)	Michigan	0	4	4	Four people were shot and injured after a dispute.
August 5, 2019	San Antonio (4)	Texas	4	0	4	A man killed his uncle, grandmother and mother before he set the house on fire and committed suicide in a triple murder–suicide.
August 5, 2019	Suitland	Maryland	1	3	4	One person was killed and three were wounded after a large fight broke out following a funeral service.
August 5, 2019	New York City (4)	New York	0	4	4	Four people were injured in a shooting during a candlelight vigil in Crown Heights.
August 4, 2019	Memphis (3)	Tennessee	1	3	4	One man was killed and three others were injured in an early morning shooting.
August 4, 2019	Grenada	Mississippi	0	4	4	Four people were discovered wounded in an overnight shooting.
August 4, 2019	Chicago (22)	Illinois	1	7	8	One person was killed and seven others were injured in a shooting in the Lawndale community.
August 4, 2019	Chicago (21)	Illinois	0	7	7	Seven people were wounded in a drive-by shooting near Douglass Park.
August 4, 2019	Dayton	Ohio	10	27	37	2019 Dayton shooting: A gunman killed nine people and injured 27 outside of a bar after he was denied entry, before being killed by police.
August 3, 2019	El Paso (1)	Texas	23	22	45	2019 El Paso Walmart shooting: 23 people were killed and 22 were injured at a Walmart near the Cielo Vista Mall in a Hispanophobic massacre. The perpetrator, Patrick Wood Crusius, was taken into custody. Crusius was sentenced in 2023 to 90 consecutive life terms without parole for federal murder charges, and is pending trial for state murder charges.
August 2, 2019	Pomfret	Maryland	3	1	4	A man shot and killed his in-laws, and wounded an 11-year-old boy sitting in a relative's car before committing suicide.
August 2, 2019	Suffolk	Virginia	2	3	5	Two men were killed, and two women and a two-year-old were wounded at multiple crime scenes.
July 31, 2019	Elkhart	Indiana	3	1	4	Police responding to shots fired at a senior living complex discovered a wounded woman, and two males and a woman deceased. It is believed one of the deceased males was the shooter.
July 30, 2019	Southaven	Mississippi	2	2	4	2019 Southaven Walmart shooting: At a Walmart store, a man killed two people then wounded a police officer before being shot by police and arrested. The perpetrator, Martez Abram, was found guilty of two counts of capital murder and one count of attempted murder, and sentenced to death in 2022.
July 30, 2019	Haskell	Oklahoma	0	4	4	During an attempted home invasion, shots were fired and four people were wounded.
July 30, 2019	Rosenberg	Texas	3	1	4	A man shot and killed his ex-girlfriends parents, and wounded her, before committing suicide in a murder–suicide.
July 30, 2019	Columbus (3)	Ohio	0	5	5	Five people were shot at a party at a home rented through Airbnb.
July 28, 2019	Chippewa Falls	Wisconsin	5	2	7	A gunman shot six people, four fatally, before killing himself.
July 28, 2019	Gilroy	California	4	17	21	Gilroy Garlic Festival shooting: Sixteen people were shot, four fatally, including a gunman and two children, at the Gilroy Garlic Festival.
July 28, 2019	Uniontown	Pennsylvania	0	4	4	Four people were wounded on two separate streets in connection with a large party.
July 28, 2019	Philadelphia (6)	Pennsylvania	1	5	6	One man was killed and five were injured by an unknown perpetrator as the victims were preparing to shoot a rap video.
July 28, 2019	Chicago (20)	Illinois	0	4	4	One woman and three men were wounded in a drive-by shooting outside of a Lawndale gas station.
July 28, 2019	Washington (6)	District of Columbia	0	4	4	Four people were shot and injured while standing outside of a bar/nightclub.
July 27, 2019	Wichita (3)	Kansas	1	3	4	One man was killed and three were injured after an altercation at an apartment complex. The suspect was later arrested.
July 27, 2019	New York City (3)	New York	1	12	13	Thirteen people were shot, one fatally, at a playground in Brownsville.
July 25, 2019	Albemarle	North Carolina	3	1	4	Officers responded to a call at a residence and discovered three deceased victims, and one wounded male, resulting from a double murder–suicide.
July 25, 2019	Los Angeles (4)	California	4	2	6	A man killed four people, including his father and brother, and wounded two more at a total of four different crime scenes across the San Fernando Valley. Two of the wounded later died, bringing the death toll to 4 people. The shooter was sentenced to life in prison in 2023.
July 23, 2019	Pembroke Park	Florida	2	2	4	Two men were killed and two others were wounded after an argument between a group escalated into a shooting.
July 21, 2019	Chicago (19)	Illinois	0	4	4	A gunman opened fire on a group of people, wounding four, as they congregated outside of a gas station.
July 21, 2019	Washington (5)	District of Columbia	0	4	4	Four people were injured in a shooting, which was captured by surveillance video.
July 20, 2019	Jersey City (1)	New Jersey	0	6	6	Six people were wounded in an overnight shooting.
July 20, 2019	Clairton	Pennsylvania	0	4	4	Four teenagers—between the ages of 14 and 18—were wounded in a shooting at a graduation party.
July 20, 2019	Chicago (18)	Illinois	0	7	7	Seven people were wounded in a shooting in Lincoln Park, after an argument between two groups escalated.
July 18, 2019	Chicago (17)	Illinois	1	3	4	One woman was killed and three people were injured on a porch at a home in Garfield Park in Chicago's West Side.
July 17, 2019	Lubbock	Texas	1	3	4	Five men in a vehicle were targeted by a shooter who killed one and injured three others.
July 16, 2019	San Antonio (3)	Texas	0	4	4	A man opened fire on his co-workers at a moving company, injuring four, after a disagreement escalated. The suspect was later arrested.
July 15, 2019	New Orleans (3)	Louisiana	1	3	4	One person was killed and three were wounded in an apartment complex.
July 15, 2019	Atlanta (5)	Georgia	0	4	4	Four people were wounded in a shooting after a potential drug deal turned deadly.
July 15, 2019	Baltimore (10)	Maryland	2	2	4	A man attempted to use a gun to demand methadone, then killed one and wounded two before being killed by police in a shootout.
July 13, 2019	Philadelphia (5)	Pennsylvania	0	7	7	Seven people were wounded in a shooting during a neighborhood basketball game.
July 13, 2019	Chicago (16)	Illinois	1	4	5	One person was killed and four were wounded in a drive-by shooting in Chicago's South Side.
July 11, 2019	Houston (5)	Texas	0	4	4	Four suspects got into a gunfight, wounding four teenagers in a common area at an apartment complex.
July 8, 2019	Manson	North Carolina	2	2	4	Two people were killed and two children—16 and 10-years-old, were wounded after a domestic dispute escalated.
July 8, 2019	Washington (4)	District of Columbia	0	4	4	Four perpetrators wounded four men in a shooting outside of a 7-Eleven store.
July 7, 2019	Flint	Michigan	2	4	6	Six people were shot, two fatally, while in a car at a gas station. Police are looking for two suspects.
July 7, 2019	Wichita (2)	Kansas	0	4	4	Four people were wounded in a shooting after a potential argument escalated.
July 7, 2019	Chicago (15)	Illinois	0	4	4	Four people were wounded in an early morning shooting in Chicago's Englewood neighborhood.
July 7, 2019	Albuquerque (1)	New Mexico	0	4	4	Four people were discovered wounded in a parking lot in the downtown area.
July 6, 2019	San Jose (2)	California	0	4	4	Four people were discovered wounded by police, who responded to a shots fired call; the victims had driven away from the initial scene.
July 6, 2019	St. Clair Shores	Michigan	2	2	4	After a dispute over fireworks, a man shot into a crowd and injured a 12-year-old child and a woman, then barricaded himself in his home. Police discovered him and a woman deceased in the home.
July 6, 2019	Charlotte (3)	North Carolina	0	4	4	Four people were shot in a McDonald's parking lot after a dispute involving a rideshare vehicle.
July 5, 2019	New York City (2)	New York	0	4	4	A gunman opened fire — injuring four people in the East New York neighborhood.
July 5, 2019	Chicago (14)	Illinois	0	5	5	Five people were wounded in a shooting in Chicago's Woodlawn community.
July 5, 2019	Reno	Nevada	1	3	4	One person died and three were wounded in a shooting.
July 5, 2019	Gravette	Arkansas	4	0	4	Four people were found deceased at a home in an apparent murder–suicide. The deaths consisted of two young males, and one middle aged female, not including the perpetrator who killed himself afterwards.
July 5, 2019	Boston (2)	Massachusetts	0	6	6	Six people were wounded in Boston's Roxbury neighborhood.
July 4, 2019	Chicago (13)	Illinois	1	3	4	One man was killed and three were wounded, after a suspect opened fire from a vehicle.
July 4, 2019	Los Angeles (3)	California	0	4	4	Four people, including a 15-year-old girl were wounded, after two perpetrators opened fire in the Historic South-Central neighborhood.
July 4, 2019	Rockford	Illinois	0	4	4	Four people were wounded after an argument escalated.
July 4, 2019	Fresno (1)	California	1	3	4	One person was killed and three were injured after gunfire erupted at an Independence Day celebration.
July 3, 2019	Katy	Texas	2	3	5	A man shot and killed his sister and wounded three others at a housewarming party before shooting himself. He later died at a hospital.
July 2, 2019	Washington Park	Illinois	0	4	4	A 16-year-old, 12-year-old and an adult were injured when an argument over fireworks escalated. The perpetrator was shot by a by-stander.
July 2, 2019	Wellston	Missouri	0	4	4	Four people were injured in a drive-by shooting just before midnight near a local food store.
July 1, 2019	Baltimore (9)	Maryland	0	4	4	Four women were injured after a suspect opened fire on them, two were discovered by police, the others privately entered the hospital.
June 30, 2019	Oakland (3)	California	0	4	4	A 12-year-old boy and two adults were injured in a shooting outside of an apartment complex.
June 30, 2019	Yucaipa	California	0	5	5	Five people were wounded after a fight escalated in a mobile home park after a BBQ.
June 30, 2019	Dallas (3)	Texas	2	2	4	Two teenagers were killed and two were wounded in a drive-by shooting near a playground.
June 30, 2019	Bay Shore	New York	0	6	6	Six people were shot at a house party.
June 29, 2019	Baton Rouge (2)	Louisiana	0	7	7	Seven people were injured in a shooting outside of a night club after a fight escalated.
June 29, 2019	Hartford (1)	Connecticut	0	4	4	Police discovered two people wounded, while an additional two were self-transported to area hospitals.
June 29, 2019	Chicago (12)	Illinois	0	5	5	Five people were wounded after gunfire broke out at a gathering in the Near West Side neighborhood.
June 28, 2019	Atlanta (4)	Georgia	0	7	7	Seven people were wounded during a drive-by shooting involving two vehicles.
June 28, 2019	Paterson (2)	New Jersey	0	4	4	Four people were wounded by gunfire that erupted on a street.
June 28, 2019	Hamden	Connecticut	0	5	5	Five people were wounded in a shooting, after police break up a house party.
June 28, 2019	Saint Paul	Minnesota	0	5	5	Five people were wounded in a shooting.
June 27, 2019	Atlanta (3)	Georgia	0	7	7	Seven people were wounded, two critically, in a drive-by shooting in the Old Fourth Ward neighborhood.
June 26, 2019	Akron (1)	Ohio	1	3	4	One man was killed and three others, including a boy, were wounded in a home invasion.
June 23, 2019	San Jose (1)	California	5	0	5	A four-hour standoff ended after a man killed four people then himself.
June 23, 2019	Abbeville	South Carolina	3	1	4	Two people were killed and two were wounded in a shooting at an apartment complex. One of the victims later died at the hospital from their injuries.
June 23, 2019	Columbus (2)	Ohio	0	5	5	Five people were wounded in a drive-by shooting outside of a local motorcycle club.
June 23, 2019	San Diego	California	1	3	4	One person was killed and three others were injured after a drive-by shooting at a party.
June 23, 2019	South Bend (1)	Indiana	1	10	11	One person was killed and ten were injured after the perpetrator opened fire on a patrons at a local bar.
June 22, 2019	Philadelphia (4)	Pennsylvania	0	4	4	Four men were wounded by gunfire in an overnight shooting.
June 22, 2019	Hampton	Virginia	0	4	4	Two adults and two children were injured in a shooting at Buckroe Beach.
June 22, 2019	Baltimore (8)	Maryland	1	4	5	A gunman opened fire on a crowd, killing a 19-year-old man and wounding four others.
June 21, 2019	Saginaw	Michigan	1	3	4	Four people were shot, one fatally, at a house on the city's west side.
June 21, 2019	Richmond (1)	California	0	5	5	Five people were wounded in a drive-by shooting.
June 21, 2019	Chicago (11)	Illinois	0	4	4	Four people, including a pregnant woman, were wounded in a shooting outside of the Parkway Garden Homes apartment complex.
June 20, 2019	Allentown	Pennsylvania	0	10	10	Ten people were injured from gunfire outside of a nightclub.
June 18, 2019	Newark (2)	New Jersey	1	6	7	One man was killed and six others were injured after gunfire broke out in two separate locations in the downtown area.
June 17, 2019	San Antonio (2)	Texas	0	4	4	Four people were injured from gunfire, after getting into an altercation with another motorist.
June 17, 2019	Memphis (2)	Tennessee	0	5	5	Five people were wounded in the parking lot of an apartment complex.
June 16, 2019	Philadelphia (3)	Pennsylvania	1	7	8	One person was killed and seven were injured at a graduation party. All of the victims are between 15 and 17 years of age.
June 16, 2019	Louisville (2)	Kentucky	1	6	7	Five men and two women were discovered shot near a liquor store by police. One of the men later died at the hospital.
June 16, 2019	Des Moines	Iowa	0	6	6	Six people were shot in a drive-by shooting while standing in the street after a party.
June 15, 2019	Shreveport	Louisiana	0	4	4	Four people were wounded in a drive-by shooting outside of a nightclub.
June 15, 2019	West Des Moines	Iowa	4	0	4	Four relatives, two children and two adults, were found dead from gunshot wounds in a house.
June 12, 2019	Charlotte (2)	North Carolina	1	3	4	An adult male was killed at a party in a rented Airbnb; a teenager and two other adults were injured.
June 11, 2019	Savannah	Georgia	2	2	4	Police responded to a scene and discovered two men deceased and two others injured.
June 11, 2019	Aurora	Colorado	0	4	4	Four people were wounded in an overnight shooting; the victims were self-transported to the hospital for treatment.
June 9, 2019	Henning	Tennessee	1	3	4	One was killed and three others were injured in a shooting at a nightclub.
June 9, 2019	Buffalo (1)	New York	0	4	4	Four people were injured in a shooting after a dispute.
June 9, 2019	Cleveland (3)	Ohio	1	3	4	One person was killed and three wounded, after the perpetrator opened fire on a crowd gathered in Kerruish Park.
June 8, 2019	White Swan	Washington	5	0	5	Five people were killed after the perpetrator opened fire on the Yakama Indian Reservation. One of the shooters received four life sentences in 2022.
June 8, 2019	Chicago (10)	Illinois	0	4	4	Four people were wounded in the Humbdolt neighborhood after an altercation with the suspect.
June 7, 2019	Austin	Texas	0	5	5	Five people were taken to the hospital after the suspect fired shots at the ground, indirectly wounding them.
June 6, 2019	Chicago (9)	Illinois	1	3	4	One man was killed and three others wounded when a secondary vehicle pulled up next to vehicle and opened fire on Lake Shore Drive.
June 5, 2019	Santa Rosa	California	0	4	4	A teenager opened fire at a soccer park, wounding an 11-year-old boy and three others.
June 1, 2019	Portsmouth	Virginia	1	3	4	One person was killed and three were critically injured in an overnight shooting.
June 1, 2019	Chicago (8)	Illinois	0	4	4	An adult male and three teenagers were wounded in a shooting in the Austin community of Chicago.
June 1, 2019	Chicago (7)	Illinois	0	4	4	Four men were wounded in two separate locations near Northwestern University's Gold Coast campus.
June 1, 2019	Atlanta (2)	Georgia	0	5	5	Police discovered three individuals wounded after responding to a shooting; an additional two were transported via personal vehicles to the hospital.
June 1, 2019	Macon	Georgia	0	4	4	Three men and a woman were injured after a suspect opened fire at a block party.
June 1, 2019	Allendale	South Carolina	0	5	5	Five men were wounded in a shooting at a car wash.
May 31, 2019	Virginia Beach	Virginia	13	4	17	2019 Virginia Beach shooting: A gunman killed 12 people and injured four others at a city public works building. The gunman died at the scene after being shot by police.
May 30, 2019	Robbins	Illinois	0	5	5	Five people were wounded after a vehicle pulled up to a large gathering and opened fire.
May 29, 2019	Cleveland	Texas	3	2	5	A man shot three employees at a local plumbing company, two fatally, before exchanging gunfire with a sheriff's deputy, also injuring him before committing suicide.
May 27, 2019	Trenton (2)	New Jersey	1	5	6	Police responded to a shooting on Walnut Avenue, and found one teenager deceased and five adults injured.
May 27, 2019	Washington (3)	District of Columbia	0	5	5	A boy and four others were wounded in a shooting in the Barry Farm neighborhood.
May 26, 2019	Stockton (2)	California	1	3	4	Police discovered one person deceased and three injured after responding to reports of a shooting.
May 26, 2019	La Crosse	Virginia	0	5	5	Multiple shooters reportedly opened fire at a block party, injuring five people.
May 26, 2019	Washington (2)	District of Columbia	1	3	4	One teenager was killed and two women and a child were injured after being shot in a parking lot.
May 26, 2019	Chicago (6)	Illinois	2	3	5	Several people were gathered outside of a party when a man opened fire, killing two and wounding three.
May 25, 2019	Oklahoma City (1)	Oklahoma	0	5	5	Five people were wounded in a parking lot, after an SUV pulled up and its occupants began shooting.
May 25, 2019	Baltimore (7)	Maryland	0	4	4	Four people, including a teenager were found shot in McElderry Park.
May 25, 2019	Chesapeake	Virginia	1	9	10	Police responded to a noise complaint at a large party, and discovered ten people with gunshot wounds. One later died from their injuries.
May 25, 2019	Trenton (1)	New Jersey	0	10	10	Ten people were wounded in a shooting at a bar.
May 20, 2019	Alexandria (1)	Louisiana	1	4	5	One teenager was killed and five were injured in a shooting.
May 20, 2019	Columbus (1)	Ohio	0	4	4	Four people were injured in a shooting in the Hilltop neighborhood.
May 20, 2019	Tulsa	Oklahoma	2	2	4	A man opened fire on a group of people, killing two and wounding two others at an apartment complex.
May 19, 2019	Portland	Oregon	0	5	5	Five people were wounded after gunfire erupted at a warehouse party.
May 18, 2019	Cascilla	Mississippi	1	5	6	One person was killed and five were injured in a shooting during a family dispute.
May 18, 2019	Cedar Rapids	Iowa	2	2	4	Two people were killed and two were wounded after an assailant shot into a vehicle outside of a tobacco store.
May 18, 2019	Atmore	Alabama	1	8	9	One person was killed and eight were wounded at a high school graduation party when a gunman opened fire during a fight.
May 18, 2019	Long Beach (1)	California	1	5	6	A 57-year-old woman was killed and five others were wounded during a vigil at a local bar.
May 18, 2019	Winston-Salem (2)	North Carolina	1	5	6	One man was killed and five were wounded at an overnight block party.
May 18, 2019	Muncie	Indiana	0	7	7	Seven people were wounded at a house party near the campus of Ball State University.
May 17, 2019	Sacramento	California	1	4	5	A woman and three others, including a 4-year-old boy were wounded in what police presume was a targeted shooting. One of the victims later died from their injuries.
May 16, 2019	Cleveland (2)	Ohio	0	4	4	Four people, including two teenagers were wounded in a shooting.
May 15, 2019	St. Rose	Louisiana	0	4	4	Four people, including two children were wounded during an altercation between two men in a strip mall parking lot.
May 13, 2019	St. Louis (3)	Missouri	4	1	5	Three people were killed and two were critically injured in a shooting at a home. One victim died of their injuries days later, taking the death toll to four.
May 13, 2019	New Orleans (2)	Louisiana	0	4	4	Three men and a teenager were wounded in a drive-by shooting in the Central City neighborhood.
May 11, 2019	Paulsboro	New Jersey	0	4	4	A person began shooting at an event that was originally reported to be a rap concert and subsequently described as a birthday party. Four people were injured by the gunfire, and a fifth person suffered a head injury after falling.
May 11, 2019	Chestnuthill Township	Pennsylvania	0	4	4	Four people were wounded in a shooting inside of a residence. The perpetrator was later arrested.
May 10, 2019	St. Louis (2)	Missouri	0	6	6	A shooting was reported near Farragut Elementary School, where two men were discovered wounded, and an additional four were identified at the hospital.
May 10, 2019	Philadelphia (2)	Pennsylvania	0	5	5	A large group of adult men were ambushed by three teenagers who came out of a breezeway and shot and injured five of them.
May 8, 2019	Indianapolis (4)	Indiana	0	4	4	Four people were wounded in a shooting near the northwest side of Indianapolis.
May 7, 2019	Highlands Ranch	Colorado	1	8	9	2019 STEM School Highlands Ranch shooting: Authorities responded to the STEM School Highlands Ranch, at about 1:50 pm on a report of shots fired. One student was fatally shot and eight others were injured; two suspects were taken into custody by police.
May 5, 2019	North Bergen	New Jersey	1	4	5	Just before 4 am, officers discovered one person deceased and four people wounded, after a fight potentially escalated.
May 5, 2019	Oceano	California	0	6	6	Officers responded to a call and discovered six individuals wounded by gunfire; the victims were transported to local hospitals for treatment.
May 4, 2019	St. Louis (1)	Missouri	1	4	5	Five people were shot inside of a vehicle; the incident resulted in one death and four injuries.
May 4, 2019	Indianapolis (3)	Indiana	0	4	4	Three teens and one man were injured after a fight involving between 20 and 30 individuals.
May 4, 2019	Wilmington (2)	Delaware	0	4	4	Four people were wounded in a shooting at West 27th and Tatnall Streets.
May 3, 2019	Baltimore (6)	Maryland	0	4	4	Four people were injured and discovered after a Shot Spotter gunfire alert notified police to the location.
May 3, 2019	Baltimore (5)	Maryland	0	5	5	Emergency responders discovered a female and two young children injured, and two men were later identified as being wounded in the same incident.
May 3, 2019	Dallas (1)	Texas	1	3	4	Four men were discovered shot at Cherrywood Park after a drive-by shooting; one of the victims died from their injuries.
May 1, 2019	Boston (1)	Massachusetts	1	3	4	One person was killed and three were wounded while sitting in a parked car in Boston's Dorchester neighborhood.
April 30, 2019	Charlotte (1)	North Carolina	2	4	6	2019 University of North Carolina at Charlotte shooting: Six people were shot, two fatally, on the last day of classes at the University of North Carolina at Charlotte. The student gunman was taken into custody after he was tackled by one of the students in the classroom. He had several more loaded magazines in a backpack.
April 28, 2019	West Chester Township	Ohio	4	0	4	Four family members, three women and one man, were found shot to death in an apartment. The shooter was given the death penalty in 2024, 2 years after a mistrial.
April 28, 2019	Nashville	Tennessee	0	7	7	Two men got into an altercation at a party and exchanged gunfire; seven people were wounded in the crossfire.
April 28, 2019	Birmingham (3)	Alabama	0	4	4	A suspect in a vehicle opened fire on patrons outside of a nightclub, injuring four.
April 28, 2019	Baltimore (4)	Maryland	1	7	8	One person was killed and seven were wounded when a gunman opened fire on two cookouts at an intersection.
April 27, 2019	Jackson	Mississippi	1	3	4	One person was killed and three were injured in a shooting in south Jackson.
April 27, 2019	Jackson	Michigan	0	4	4	Four people were wounded in an overnight shooting.
April 27, 2019	Poway	California	1	3	4	Poway synagogue shooting: One person was killed and three were wounded by a shooter at the Chabad of Poway synagogue.
April 26, 2019	Hugo	Oklahoma	0	4	4	Investigators attempted to make contact with the suspect in relation to another crime, he then began to open fire, injuring three children and himself.
April 21, 2019	Philadelphia (1)	Pennsylvania	0	4	4	Four people were wounded in the Grays Ferry Section of the city.
April 21, 2019	Los Angeles (2)	California	0	4	4	Four seniors were wounded by gunfire after a suspect opened fire in the vehicle behind them.
April 20, 2019	Memphis (1)	Tennessee	0	7	7	Seven people were wounded in a shooting that police believe occurred after a large fight.
April 20, 2019	Corpus Christi	Texas	0	4	4	A disturbance in a neighborhood escalated into a shooting; four men were wounded.
April 19, 2019	Wichita (1)	Kansas	0	4	4	Two suspects fired multiple shots at people attending a party, injuring four.
April 18, 2019	Louisville (1)	Kentucky	0	4	4	Four people in a vehicle were wounded when they were shot at by at least one person in another car.
April 16, 2019	Germantown	Maryland	1	3	4	A drive-by shooting killed an 18-year-old male and wounded three other men in a cul-de-sac.
April 14, 2019	Stockton (1)	California	0	4	4	A man opened fire inside of a bar following a disturbance, wounding four patrons.
April 14, 2019	Vallejo	California	1	3	4	One man was killed and three were injured in an early morning shooting.
April 14, 2019	Miami (2)	Florida	2	2	4	Two women were killed and another man and woman were wounded in a drive-by shooting outside of Miami's Liberty City neighborhood.
April 12, 2019	Carbondale	Illinois	0	4	4	Four people were injured in a shooting outside of a restaurant and bar.
April 11, 2019	Phoenix (4)	Arizona	4 (Note: 1 by blunt force trauma)	2	5	A man killed his wife, two of his daughters, and another man, and injured two people who came to try to help one of the victims. All of the victims were shot, with the exception of one of his daughters who was killed by blunt force trauma.
April 11, 2019	Los Angeles (1)	California	1	4	5	One person was killed and four were wounded when suspects fired at them from a car in the Watts neighborhood of Los Angeles.
April 11, 2019	Baltimore (3)	Maryland	0	4	4	Four men were wounded in a shooting near Druid Hill Park.
April 9, 2019	Kansas City (1)	Missouri	0	4	4	Police found four people with gunshot wounds in front of a residence.
April 7, 2019	Shreveport (2)	Louisiana	0	4	4	Four people were wounded in a shooting at a mobile home park.
April 7, 2019	Indianapolis (2)	Indiana	2	3	5	Two people were killed and three were wounded in a shooting at a motorcycle club hangout.
April 7, 2019	Winston-Salem (1)	North Carolina	0	6	6	Six people were wounded in a shooting outside of a local bar.
April 7, 2019	Wilmington (1)	Delaware	0	6	6	Six young men were wounded in a shooting in the city's East Side district.
April 6, 2019	Chicago (5)	Illinois	0	6	6	Six people were injured in a shooting at a baby shower.
April 6, 2019	Tallahassee (2)	Florida	0	4	4	Four Florida A&M University students were injured in a shooting following an argument at a house party.
April 4, 2019	Panama City	Florida	1	3	4	One person was killed and three were found with gunshot injuries in Panama City.
April 4, 2019	Stockbridge	Georgia	3	2	5	Two officers responding to a suspected hostage situation were wounded and three individuals were later found deceased in a murder–suicide.
April 2, 2019	Hermanville	Mississippi	0	4	4	A man shot four people in a drive-by shooting outside of a convenience store.
April 2, 2019	Covington	Kentucky	0	5	5	Five people were wounded in a drive-by shooting at an intersection.
March 31, 2019	Chicago (4)	Illinois	1	4	5	One person was killed and four people were wounded in a shooting in East Garfield Park.
March 31, 2019	Atlanta (1)	Georgia	1	4	5	One person was killed and four were wounded during a house party.
March 31, 2019	North Charleston	South Carolina	0	7	7	Seven people were wounded in a shooting at an overnight house party.
March 28, 2019	Baltimore (2)	Maryland	0	4	4	Four people were wounded in a shooting near a playground.
March 25, 2019	North Las Vegas	Nevada	0	5	5	An after-school fight led to a shooting in a neighborhood; five teenagers were wounded.
March 24, 2019	San Francisco (1)	California	1	5	6	A shooting occurred near the Fillmore Heritage Center around 8:40 pm local time; one person was killed and five others were injured.
March 24, 2019	Phoenix (3)	Arizona	0	7	7	During a warehouse party, a fight broke out and escalated into a shooting; seven people were wounded.
March 19, 2019	Phoenix (2)	Arizona	2	4	6	An argument at a house party ended in a shooting when the perpetrator returned to the party and killed two and wounded four before fleeing.
March 17, 2019	Augusta	Georgia	0	4	4	Four people were wounded after an argument, although the shooter claims that it was in self-defense to being randomly attacked.
March 17, 2019	Las Vegas	Nevada	0	4	4	Four people were wounded at the El Cortez Hotel and Casino in an early morning shooting. The suspect was later arrested.
March 17, 2019	Rochelle	Georgia	1	3	4	In the early morning, two groups were involved in a dispute, which ended with one person killed and three people wounded.
March 16, 2019	Camden	New Jersey	1	3	4	One man was killed and three others were wounded following a shooting at a "residential speakeasy".
March 15, 2019	Mobile (1)	Alabama	2	3	5	Two men were killed and three others were wounded in an overnight shooting behind a home. Two suspects were arrested the next day and sentenced to 20 and 25 years in prison, respectively.
March 14, 2019	Missoula	Montana	2	2	4	Two people were fatally shot and two others were wounded, including a Montana Highway Patrol trooper following a road rage incident. The shooter was sentenced to life without parole.
March 13, 2019	Harvey	Illinois	1	3	4	One person was killed and three were wounded after gunfire erupted in a nightclub.
March 11, 2019	Paterson (1)	New Jersey	0	4	4	Four men were wounded in a shooting inside of a local liquor store.
March 10, 2019	Denver (1)	Colorado	1	4	5	A conflict between two individuals escalated into a shooting; one man was killed, and four others were injured.
March 10, 2019	Shreveport (1)	Louisiana	0	4	4	Three children and one adult were wounded in a drive-by shooting.
March 3, 2019	Oakland (2)	California	0	4	4	Four people were injured in a shooting at a sports bar following a fight.
March 3, 2019	Chicago (3)	Illinois	0	6	6	Six people were injured in a shooting at a bar following a fight.
March 2, 2019	Pine Bluff	Arkansas	1	4	5	One person was killed and four other were wounded at a party when shots were fired into a home.
February 28, 2019	Joliet	Illinois	4	0	4	Two adults and their 6 and 1-year-old children were killed in an apparent murder suicide.
February 28, 2019	Oakland (1)	California	1	4	5	One person was killed and four others were wounded in a shooting near a gas station.
February 22, 2019	Birmingham (2)	Alabama	2	2	4	Two people were killed and two were injured in a shooting at a party in a home.
February 21, 2019	Elizabeth	Kentucky	2	2	4	Two people were killed and two others were found wounded in two separate shootings. The shooter was sentenced to life without parole in 2021.
February 21, 2019	Baltimore (1)	Maryland	1	4	5	Officers on patrol responded to gunshots, and upon investigation discovered a deceased male and four wounded victims.
February 21, 2019	Houston (4)	Texas	2	2	4	A gunman perched on the roof of a home killed two and wounded two after an argument led to the incident.
February 20, 2019	Covington	Tennessee	0	4	4	Three adults and a teenager were injured inside a home in a presumed targeted shooting.
February 18, 2019	Solon Township	Michigan	4	0	4	A 28-year-old woman killed her three children, ages 8, 6 and 2, before killing herself.
February 17, 2019	Evansville (1)	Indiana	0	5	5	Five people were wounded after shots were fired outside of a bar. Two suspects were taken into custody by police.
February 17, 2019	Henderson	Texas	2	2	4	Two people were wounded and two were killed in a shooting at an apartment complex. The shooter was later arrested in Bienville Parish, Louisiana. He was sentenced to life in prison in 2022.
February 17, 2019	New Orleans (1)	Louisiana	1	5	6	After police attempted to arrest a suspect, a gunfight broke out, and led to one person being killed and five being wounded.
February 16, 2019	Clinton	Mississippi	4	0	5	Police responded to a domestic dispute at a residence; upon arrival, the suspect fired shots at officers leading to a 12-hour hostage standoff. Four people were killed, and the suspect was taken into custody and later died.
February 15, 2019	Aurora (1)	Illinois	6	6	12	Aurora, Illinois shooting: A man opened fire in his workplace, killing five employees, and injuring five police officers and a civilian before being killed by police.
February 14, 2019	Jacksonville (3)	Florida	2	2	4	After a fight broke out near a basketball court at a park, multiple people started shooting at each other. Two people were killed, and two were wounded.
February 11, 2019	Livingston	Texas	5	0	5	A family member heard sounds of gunfire, and upon investigation, found four adults and one toddler deceased.
February 9, 2019	Petersburg	Virginia	0	4	4	Four people were injured in a shooting outside of an apartment complex.
February 6, 2019	New York City (1)	New York	1	3	4	A man was killed and three others were injured after a shooting in the lobby of an apartment building around 10:30 pm ET.
February 6, 2019	Cleveland (1)	Ohio	1	3	4	One man was killed and three others were injured after a shooting broke out in Cleveland's Clark–Fulton neighborhood.
February 5, 2019	San Antonio (1)	Texas	2	2	4	A man and woman were killed and two others injured after the shooter kicked open an apartment door and shot inside, before fleeing. The shooter was sentenced to 40 years in prison in 2022.
February 4, 2019	Washington (1)	District of Columbia	0	5	5	Four men and an elementary-school-age girl were injured in a shooting at a bus stop.
February 4, 2019	Baton Rouge (1)	Louisiana	0	4	4	Four people were wounded in an early morning shooting.
February 3, 2019	Chicago (2)	Illinois	2	5	7	Around 2 am local time, two people were killed and five people were wounded in a drive-by shooting after a fight outside of a club.
February 1, 2019	San Diego (1)	California	0	4	4	A fight broke out at a house party and shots were fired; four people were wounded.
January 28, 2019	Houston (3)	Texas	2	4	6	Pecan Park Raid: Four police officers were shot while serving a warrant in southeast Houston. The two homeowners were killed.
January 27, 2019	Birmingham (1)	Alabama	0	5	5	Police responded to a call and discovered five people with gunshot wounds, along with two of the victims sustaining life-threatening injuries.
January 26, 2019	Newark (1)	New Jersey	1	3	4	A gunman opened fire on individuals attending a candlelight vigil, killing one, and wounding three others.
January 26, 2019	Indianapolis (1)	Indiana	0	5	5	A man was asked to leave a bar; shortly after, he came back and shot five people, critically wounding two.
January 26, 2019	Albany	Georgia	0	4	4	Two people were found with bullet wounds in front of a residence, and two more arrived at a hospital with gunshot injuries from the same shooting.
January 26, 2019	Ascension Parish and Livingston Parish	Louisiana	5	0	5	January 2019 Louisiana shootings: A 21-year-old man killed five people, including his parents, in two parishes in Louisiana. The suspect fled to Virginia where he was arrested. In 2023, he was sentenced to life in prison without parole.
January 24, 2019	State College	Pennsylvania	4	1	5	A man killed two people and injured one inside a local bar, then drove away and broke into a home and killed the homeowner before killing himself.
January 24, 2019	Rockmart	Georgia	4	1	5	A man killed four individuals and injured another in two separate shootings. The shooter was later arrested in Indiana.
January 23, 2019	Sebring	Florida	5	0	5	2019 Sebring shooting: Five people were killed in a hostage incident and shooting at a bank. The suspect was taken into custody by police and sentenced to death in 2024.
January 20, 2019	Miami (1)	Florida	0	4	4	Three adults and a child were wounded in a shooting while attending a block party.
January 19, 2019	Gaffney	South Carolina	1	4	5	One person was killed and four others were wounded in a shooting at a nightclub.
January 19, 2019	Jacksonville (2)	Florida	3	2	5	A man killed two people and injured two more before killing himself.
January 19, 2019	Lebanon	Pennsylvania	0	4	4	In an apparent targeted shooting, four individuals were discovered shot in a building.
January 19, 2019	Chicago (1)	Illinois	0	4	4	Early in the morning, three women and a man were involved in a fight and were injured in the ensuing shooting.
January 19, 2019	Houston (2)	Texas	3	2	5	Three people were killed and two more were injured by a homeowner during an attempted home invasion.
January 17, 2019	Owensboro	Kentucky	3	1	4	Three people were killed and another person was wounded in a shooting at a home. Two men were arrested in relation to the shooting. One was sentenced to life in prison while the other was given 10 years.
January 16, 2019	Jacksonville (1)	Florida	1	5	6	A man was killed and five other people were injured in a shooting. The Mayor of Jacksonville described the shooting as gang-related, although this characterization has been disputed by the sister of the deceased man.
January 16, 2019	Palmdale	California	3	1	4	Three people were killed and another one was wounded in a shooting. The shooter was sentenced to life in prison without parole in 2021.
January 15, 2019	Little Rock (1)	Arkansas	1	4	5	An argument over a gun inside a local ice cream shop led to a shooting. One man was killed and four others, including the suspected shooter, were injured.
January 13, 2019	Phoenix (1)	Arizona	1	5	6	An argument at a motel escalated into a shooting. One person was killed, and five others were injured.
January 6, 2019	Roswell	New Mexico	0	4	4	A man injured four people in a shooting following an argument at a party. He was arrested the same day.
January 4, 2019	Hurt	Virginia	3	2	5	A man killed his wife and son in their home and injured two people who were inside a vehicle before killing himself.
January 4, 2019	Houston (1)	Texas	1	3	4	A man injured his brother and two friends before being killed by a police officer.
January 4, 2019	Torrance	California	3	4	7	An argument at a bowling alley escalated into a fight and a shooting, leaving three people dead and four others wounded. A suspect who was out of prison on parole has been arrested. The shooter was sentenced to life in prison in 2022.
January 3, 2019	Texas City	Texas	3	1	4	Three children under the age of six were found deceased along with a wounded woman in an apparent home invasion. The shooter was sentenced to life in prison without parole in 2021.
January 2, 2019	Jonesboro	Arkansas	1	3	4	A 16-year-old boy was killed and three others were wounded during a home invasion. The shooter was sentenced to 55 years in prison in 2021.
January 1, 2019	Columbia (1)	South Carolina	0	5	5	Five people were shot and wounded outside of a nightclub around 6am local time.
January 1, 2019	Tallahassee (1)	Florida	0	5	5	Five people were shot and wounded around 3am local time at the University Village Shopping Center.

== Mass shootings by death toll ==
The deadliest mass shootings and mass killings in the United States in 2019, ranked by the number of people killed (excluding the perpetrator(s), where applicable):

Date	Community	State	Dead	Injured	Total	Description
August 3, 2019	El Paso (1)	Texas	23	22	45	2019 El Paso Walmart shooting: 23 people were killed and 22 were injured at a Walmart near the Cielo Vista Mall in a Hispanophobic massacre. The perpetrator, Patrick Wood Crusius, was taken into custody. Crusius was sentenced in 2023 to 90 consecutive life terms without parole for federal murder charges, and is pending trial for state murder charges.
May 31, 2019	Virginia Beach	Virginia	13	4	17	2019 Virginia Beach shooting: A gunman killed 12 people and injured four others at a city public works building. The gunman died at the scene after being shot by police.
August 4, 2019	Dayton	Ohio	10	27	37	2019 Dayton shooting: A gunman killed nine people and injured 27 outside of a bar after he was denied entry, before being killed by police.
August 31, 2019	Odessa and Midland	Texas	8	25	33	Midland–Odessa shooting: Eight people were killed, including the perpetrator, and 25 were wounded when a gunman opened fire on police and civilians after fleeing from a traffic stop.
October 14, 2019	San Juan	Puerto Rico	6	0	6	2019 Río Piedras shooting: Six people were killed in a shootout at a housing project.
February 15, 2019	Aurora (1)	Illinois	6	6	12	Aurora, Illinois shooting: A man opened fire in his workplace, killing five employees, and injuring five police officers and a civilian before being killed by police.
October 31, 2019	Orinda	California	5	4	9	Orinda shooting: At an overnight Halloween party attended by over 100 people, five people were killed, and four more wounded by gunfire.
October 12, 2019	Chicago (30)	Illinois	5	0	5	Four people were killed and one injured after a neighbor entered their apartment and opened fire. The fifth victim died of her injuries later in hospital.
September 2, 2019	Elkmont	Alabama	5	0	5	A 14-year-old boy shot dead five family members – two adults and three children – in an Alabama residence. He confessed the crime to the police. The perpetrator was sentenced to life in 2023.
June 8, 2019	White Swan	Washington	5	0	5	Five people were killed after the perpetrator opened fire on the Yakama Indian Reservation. One of the shooters received four life sentences in 2022.
January 26, 2019	Ascension Parish and Livingston Parish	Louisiana	5	0	5	January 2019 Louisiana shootings: A 21-year-old man killed five people, including his parents, in two parishes in Louisiana. The suspect fled to Virginia where he was arrested. In 2023, he was sentenced to life in prison without parole.
January 23, 2019	Sebring	Florida	5	0	5	2019 Sebring shooting: Five people were killed in a hostage incident and shooting at a bank. The suspect was taken into custody by police and sentenced to death in 2024.

== Monthly statistics ==
According to data compiled by the Associated Press, USA Today, and Northeastern University, the year 2019 saw the highest number of mass killings recorded to date: 475 killed in 441 incidents. Thirty-three of these mass killings, defined here as four or more people killed excluding the perpetrator, involved firearms.

2019 US mass shooting statistics by month
Month	Shootings	Killed	Injured	Schools	Place of Worship
January	28	48	86	0	0
February	23	42	68	1	0
March	21	13	89	1	0
April	34	24	136	0	1
May	43	41	195	3	0
June	50	34	215	0	0
July	52	50	207	0	0
August	48	83	217	2	0
September	38	46	127	0	0
October	36	58	126	0	0
November	32	27	126	1	0
December	36	51	144	0	0
Total	441	517	1736	8	1

== See also ==
- List of school shootings in the United States (before 2000)
- List of school shootings in the United States (2000–present)
- List of school shootings in the United States by death toll
- Casualty recording
