= 2019 Sebring shooting =

Mass shooting in Florida, U.S.

- Location: 27.47047°N 81.45844°W; SunTrust Bank, Sebring, Florida
- Date: January 23, 2019; 7 years ago
- Attack type: Mass shooting
- Weapon: Springfield Armory XD 9mm handgun
- Deaths: 5
- Perpetrator: Zephen Allen Xaver
- Motive: Homicidal and suicidal urges
- Verdict: Pleaded guilty
- Convictions: First-degree murder (5 counts)
- Sentence: Death

On January 23, 2019, at around 12:30 pm, five women – four employees and a customer – were shot and killed at the SunTrust Bank in Sebring, Florida, United States. Zephen Xaver, aged 21, surrendered and was arrested at the scene by police after a standoff and the deployment of a SWAT team. He initially pleaded not guilty to five murders. On March 14, 2023, he pleaded guilty in the shooting. On December 16, 2024, he was sentenced to death.

== Shooting ==
At 12:32 pm, a man entered the SunTrust Bank wearing a ballistic vest underneath his sweatshirt. Minutes before entering the bank, he texted to his girlfriend that he was going to die today and that he was going to kill people just to know how it would feel. He walked up to one of the bank tellers and pulled out a handgun. He forced the bank teller and everyone else in the lobby to gather at a wall with their hands up. He told the teller to lock both doors to the bank and she complied. The shooter then ordered the five women to lie down on the floor face down with their heads pointing towards the wall. At 12:35 pm, the shooter executed all five women with nine shots. The man phoned the police at 12:36 pm ET, and told responders that he had shot five people. While on the phone with police, he walked back to the bodies of the five women and fired two more shots at them. During the middle of the call, the man pointed the handgun to his own head and told the operator that he might kill himself. SWAT arrived, trying to negotiate to get the barricaded suspect to leave the bank. The perpetrator also told police he had a nine-millimeter handgun and was wearing a bulletproof vest. During the negotiations, the suspect told the negotiator that he was hearing voices telling him to kill and that placing the gun to his head weakened the voices. The crisis negotiator eventually convinced the suspect to put the handgun down and surrender, as members of the SWAT team entered the bank by ramming an armored vehicle through its glass front doors. The suspect was arrested.

The lone survivor of the shooting was a bank employee who had been in the bank's break room just before the gunman walked in. The employee escaped out the back door when gunshots first rang out; after getting outside, he called 911.

== Victims ==
Five women were discovered by police, shot execution style in the back of their heads and upper backs. They were identified as:

- Debra Cook, age 54, employee
- Marisol Lopez, 55, employee
- Jessica Montague, 31, employee
- Cynthia Watson, 65, customer
- Ana Piñon-Williams, 37, employee

== Perpetrator ==
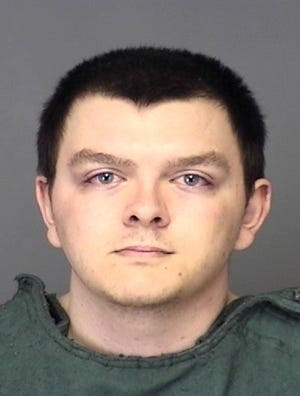
A mug shot of Xaver after his arrest

The perpetrator, 21-year-old Zephen Allen Xaver (born April 2, 1997), was born in Plymouth, Indiana, and raised in neighboring Bremen. He was taken into custody after surrendering to local officers, and was identified as a former Florida Department of Corrections correctional officer trainee with the Avon Park Correctional Institution, a position from which he resigned on January 9, 2019. Xaver was charged with five counts of capital murder and held by police without bond. He was appointed a public defender as he had no income or assets. On February 22, he entered a plea of not guilty in the case. Prosecutors intended to seek the death penalty. On March 14, 2023, Xaver pleaded guilty in the shooting. In June 2024, jurors recommended the death penalty. On December 16, 2024, he was sentenced to death by a jury vote of 9-to-3.

== See also ==
- Capital punishment in Florida
- List of mass shootings in the United States in 2019
- List of death row inmates in the United States § Florida
