= 2019 Ascension–Livingston shootings =

Shooting spree in Louisiana, U.S.

- Location: Ascension and Livingston parishes, Louisiana, US
- Date: January 26, 2019
- Attack type: Spree shooting; familicide; domestic violence; mass murder; mass shooting
- Weapon: Handgun
- Deaths: 5
- Injuries: 0
- Perpetrator: Dakota Theriot

On January 26, 2019, a gunman shot and killed five people in Ascension and Livingston parishes, Louisiana, before being taken into custody in Virginia.

== Incident ==
A few weeks prior to the incident, Dakota Theriot was taken in by his girlfriend's family, after being kicked out by his own parents. Investigators claim that Theriot, using a handgun he stole from his father, killed three members of his girlfriend's family in Livingston Parish, before he stole a truck and drove to neighboring Ascension Parish and killed his parents. The victims in Livingston Parish were Billy Ernest, aged 43, Summer Ernest, aged 20, and Tanner Ernest, aged 17; Elizabeth and Keith Theriot, both in their early fifties, were killed in Gonzales. All five victims had been shot in the head. The neighbor of the Ernest family told reporters that the two surviving Ernest children; aged 7 and 1 years old, ran to her home to call 9-1-1 and were unharmed in the incident. Police found both Elizabeth and Keith Theriot alive at their house after Keith called 911. Keith reportedly identified his son as the shooter. The couple later died at the hospital.

After a day-long manhunt, Theriot was arrested by the Virginia State Police in Richmond County, Virginia, approximately 1,000 miles (1,600 km) from the crime scene, in the driveway of his grandmother's home in Warsaw. He allegedly pointed the gun at the officers, trying to get them to fatally shoot him. It was reported he had driven there to "hug and kiss his two aunts and grandmother goodbye" and did not fight extradition.

== Perpetrator ==
21-year-old Dakota Michael Theriot (born April 17, 1997) was identified as the suspect in the shootings. He had prior brushes with the law and short involuntary mental health stays. Friends and family have claimed that he reported hearing voices, threatened to burn down his parents’ home, and his ex-wife has claimed to Kenner Police he was schizophrenic. His ex-wife also raised claims of abuse throughout their three-year relationship and eleven-day marriage. At a court hearing seeking a protective order against Theriot, she alleged that he not only choked, punched, and slapped her, but also broke her wrist when he threw her through a window. Contending the wife had not proven her allegations, the judge dissolved the temporary order of protection against Theriot; the judge instead ordered both parties have no contact with each other via joint injunction.

Theriot confessed to the shooting soon after his arrest, saying that he did it in "pure, cold blood," according to a deputy who testified in court.

In March 2019, he entered a not guilty plea on three counts of first-degree murder in Livingston Parish and later entered the same plea for two counts of first-degree murder in Ascension Parish a month later. His lawyers asked for the Ascension Parish judge to halt proceedings until sources of funding can be found for his defense, as they have been working pro bono for the past month and that Theriot is indigent.

On January 11, 2023, Theriot pled guilty in the shootings and was sentenced to life in prison.

== See also ==
- List of mass shootings in the United States in 2019
