= Orinda shooting =

2019 mass shooting in California, U.S.

- Location: 37.87233°N 122.184°W; Orinda, California, United States
- Date: October 31, 2019; 10:30 p.m (PDT)
- Target: House party attendees
- Attack type: Mass shooting
- Weapon: Firearm
- Deaths: 5
- Injuries: 8 (5 by gunfire)

The Orinda shooting was a mass shooting that occurred on October 31, 2019, during a house party celebrating Halloween in Orinda, California, United States. Five people were killed and four others were injured. The house had been rented for one night through Airbnb, which enacted a policy banning short-term rentals for Halloween parties two days later. Although several people were arrested a few weeks after the shooting, they were released without being charged and police have been unable to identify the perpetrators.

== Location ==
The shooting occurred at a 4,000 sq ft (370 m^{2}), four-bedroom house in Orinda, which was renting for $420 per night through Airbnb at the time of the party. The short-term rental was arranged by a woman who reportedly told the property owner that she was hosting a family reunion for 12 people and because some guests had asthma, they needed to gather at a location free of wildfire smoke. The shooting took place during the Kincade Fire, which was burning approximately 85 mi (137 km) north of Orinda. Since the rental was only for one night on Halloween, the owner told the renter that no parties were allowed.

In February 2019, the owners had advertised the house on Airbnb as suitable for large parties with 30 guests at a rate of $800 per day. One neighbor had complained in 2018 about short-term renters, who had parked in the street and blocked his driveway, and city records showed they had issued violations to the property in March 2019 for exceeding the maximum occupancy (two per bedroom plus three additional people) and illegal parking.

== Incident ==
The shooting happened on Halloween night at a party that was attended by at least 100 people; it had been advertised on social media as an "Airbnb mansion party" scheduled to start at 10 pm (PDT). The owner of the house told reporters that they reached out to the renter after neighbors contacted them about the party. The home was equipped with a doorbell camera which the property owner used to verify that a party was taking place, in violation of the rental agreement. Neighbors called the police complaining about noise at 9:19 pm and 10:25 pm (PDT), and an officer was dispatched to the home at 10:48 pm.

Additional police responded to the home after receiving reports at 10:50 pm of gunshots being fired inside a short-term rental home; call logs showed the city's only two patrol officers on duty that night previously had been called to Oakland at 8:48 pm to recover a stolen car and were not in Orinda at the time of the shooting. They were dispatched to the house at 10:51 pm and arrived at approximately 11 pm. When officers arrived, many of those attending the party were fleeing the scene. A party-goer claimed that there was no warning about the shooting and that there had been no argument or physical altercation before the shooting. Two guns were found at the house after the shooting.

=== Victims ===
Three men died at the scene and a fourth man was pronounced dead at the hospital. Authorities took four others to local hospitals, and an unknown number may have sought medical treatment on their own. In total, four men in their twenties were killed, and a 19-year-old woman died from her injuries on November 1. Several others were injured, either through gunshots or from fleeing the scene, including one who had jumped more than 30 ft (9.1 m) from a balcony to escape. All the fatal victims were African Americans.

=== Investigation ===
The Contra Costa County Sheriff's Office crime lab investigated the incident and the two firearms that were retrieved from the home. Multiple law enforcement agencies have described the incident as a shootout. After an initial review of video captured during that night, investigators said several party guests were seen tucking guns into their pants to avoid scrutiny from a security guard posted by the front door. According to witnesses, one guest had been caught trying to steal property from another guest, precipitating what the sheriff called "a bloodbath inside the home", starting in the house's kitchen.

Two of the victims belonged to the San Francisco-based Page Street Mob gang; because one of those victims was the younger brother of the sole person charged with a quadruple homicide in Hayes Valley that occurred in 2015, the San Francisco Police Department joined the investigation, suspecting the Orinda shootings could have been a retaliatory act.

The Contra Costa County Sheriff's Department served probable cause arrest warrants in the morning of November 14, 2019, arresting five men from the Bay Area cities of San Mateo, Marin City, Vallejo, and Antioch in connection to the shootings. Four of the suspects were charged with murder and conspiracy and the fifth, a party promoter, was charged as an accessory. On November 18, all five were released as the county district attorney (DA) declined to press charges pending further investigation. The "Ramey warrants" used for the arrests only required probable cause, but the DA's office examined the credible evidence and were not sure they could prove their case beyond a reasonable doubt. An official from the DA's office stated "the investigation is still active and ongoing and folks can still be charged if more evidence came to light".

On November 21, 2019, the Contra Costa Sheriff's Department and federal agents from the Bureau of Alcohol, Tobacco, Firearms and Explosives arrested two more suspects on charges of illegal possession of weapons and child endangerment, seizing a gun linked to this and multiple other shootings.

By February 2020, lack of evidence was stalling further progress in the investigation. As of 2021, the shooting remains unsolved.

== Response ==
=== Memorials ===
A memorial was created outside the home, and a large memorial of flowers, photos of the individuals who died, and notes of sympathy were left at a fountain near Orinda Theater Square in downtown Orinda. One sign at the memorial read, "Your lives matter." The fountain was decorated as a temporary memorial again one year later.

The dream of one of the victims, Oshiana Thompkins, was to start a youth recreation center; Thompkins' mother created a nonprofit foundation in 2021 and began operating a community center in El Sobrante in April 2022, both in Thompkins' name. Thompkins also was a registered organ donor, and her gifts were honored through a florograph portrait on the Donate Life Rose Parade float in January 2023.

=== Short-term rental policies ===
Airbnb's co-founder and CEO Brian Chesky announced a change in company policy on November 2, stating that the company would carry out a site-wide ban on "party houses" and would implement a system that would screen for and flag potential high-risk reservations. The company will also create a dedicated rapid response team, to take immediate action against users who violate the new guest policies including the potential removal of the guests or renters. That December, Airbnb rolled out new rules banning "open invitation" parties at all accommodations hosted by the platform, with limited exceptions for boutique hotels and professional event venues.

The Orinda City Council scheduled a special hearing shortly after the shooting to discuss the incident and to determine if there was a need for possible regulations to prohibit out-of-control parties. Other concerns addressed during the meeting included rental properties. A short-term ordinance was passed, banning short-term rentals and property owners are required to register with the city if they plan on renting a room or home for less than 30 days. It was modified slightly and extended to November 2020 a month later. The modified ordinance was extended until November 2021 in 2020.

Some residents in Orinda and the greater San Francisco Bay Area expressed frustration that the reaction to the shooting focused more on Airbnb policy than on empathy for the victims. After sharp criticism over "racially charged insensitivity, to place a large degree of blame on the victims" from a lawyer representing a victim's family, Airbnb announced it would cover the cost of the funerals and counseling for the victims' families. There were questions about whether the news coverage of this event, where all the victims were persons of color, was comparable to that for other mass shootings.

=== Litigation ===
In March 2020, Airbnb and the property owners were sued by the family of one victim, who claimed they should have been aware of the history of the property as a party house, seeking damages for wrongful death. The complaint also named 100 anonymous party guests as liable. Another lawsuit was filed in October 2021, which claimed in part the owners had never occupied the house, and had purchased it specifically as a short-term rental, with the first listing occurring in September 2018, approximately nine months after its purchase.

== See also ==
- List of homicides in California
- List of mass shootings in the United States in 2019
- Mass shootings in the United States
