= 2019 Río Piedras shooting =

Mass shooting in Puerto Rico

- Location: 18.410307°N 66.0269325°W; Río Piedras, San Juan, Puerto Rico
- Date: October 14, 2019 c. 7:00 p.m. (EST)
- Attack type: Mass shooting, shootout
- Deaths: 6
- Injuries: 0
- Perpetrator: Unknown
- Motive: Unknown

On October 14, 2019, six people were killed during a shootout between drug gangs in a gun battle at the Ernesto Ramos Antonini de Río Piedras residential apartments in the Río Piedras area of San Juan, Puerto Rico.

The shooting led to alarm partly because it followed an earlier shooting in the same area that resulted in two deaths. News reports were of earlier shootings in other areas, one in Cayey resulting in three deaths and another in a gas station that resulted in three deaths. The first in this series of massacres was three people in Ciales on June 10. More than 1000 bullet shells were recovered from the scene.

== Reactions ==
The governor of Puerto Rico, Wanda Vázquez Garced, held emergency meetings.

In The Bronx, NY a vigil for the victims was held.
