= Ewe drumming =

Drumming ensembles of the Ewe people

Ewe drumming refers to the drumming ensembles of the Ewe people of Ghana, Togo, and Benin. The Ewe are known for their experience in drumming throughout West Africa. The sophisticated cross rhythms and polyrhythms in Ewe drumming are similar to those in Afro-Caribbean music and late jazz. The original purpose of Ewe drumming were sung or performed by warriors. Now the songs and performed to celebrate or for recreational use. For example, Agbadza was originally used as a warrior dance but is now used to celebrate events.

== Variation ==
Ewe drumming is very diverse and is played in many slightly different ways. For example, an Ewe musician from Togo may play a piece or instrument slightly differently from the way a Ewe from Ghana does. The Fon people of Benin are another example of this variation. They construct their villages, towns, and cities on water, and because of this, they do not play the same upright drums other Ewe play. Instead, they place large gourds on water as drums.

== Instrumental performance ==
An Ewe drumming ensemble consists of several drums, a bell, and a rattle. Each ensemble usually has a master drum, an iron bell called a gankogui, and a group of secondary drummers.

== Bell instruments ==
=== Gankogui ===
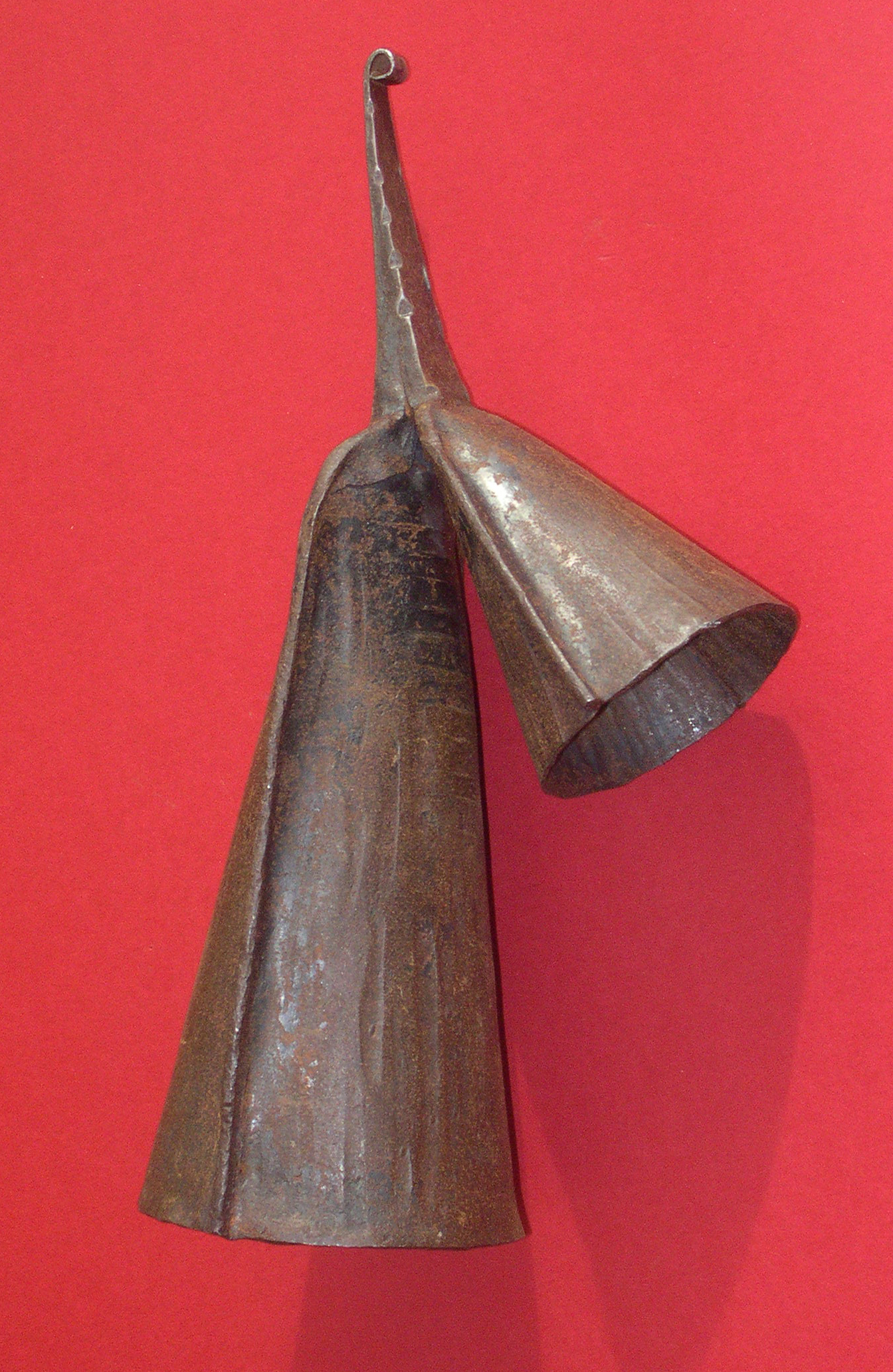
Gankogui

The gankogui, also known as a gakpevi, is a bell, or gong instrument played with a wooden stick. It is made out of forged iron and consists of a low-pitched bell (often referred as the parent bell) and a high-pitched bell (or the child bell, which is said to rest on the bosom of the protective parent), which are permanently bound together. The gankogui is the skeleton, backbone, and foundation of all traditional Ewe music. The gankogui player must play steadily and without error throughout the piece. The gankogui player must be a trustworthy person, and is considered blind if they do not have a concrete understanding of the instrument and its role in the drumming ensemble. In a drumming ensemble, a gankogui player uses no variation.

The time span of one bell cycle establishes the temporal period of the music, although some phrases cover several bell cycles. The regulative time point—“the one”—is the instant of maximum, although quite temporary, stasis. In each bell cycle, it is the moment towards which the ensemble thematic cycle moves. The bell phrase guides the tempo, aligns the instruments, and marks elapsing musical time into bell cycle units.

— David Locke, (2010: web)

=== Atoke ===
The atoke is a forged-iron bell instrument and is shaped somewhat like a boat or a banana. It is held in the palm of the player's weak hand and is played with a small forged-iron rod, held in the player's strong hand. You strike the rod against the outside of the bell to create a pitch. The atoke serves the same purpose as the gankogui and is sometimes used instead of or a substitute for the gankogui. The gankogui and atoke come in all various sizes.

== Rattle instrument ==
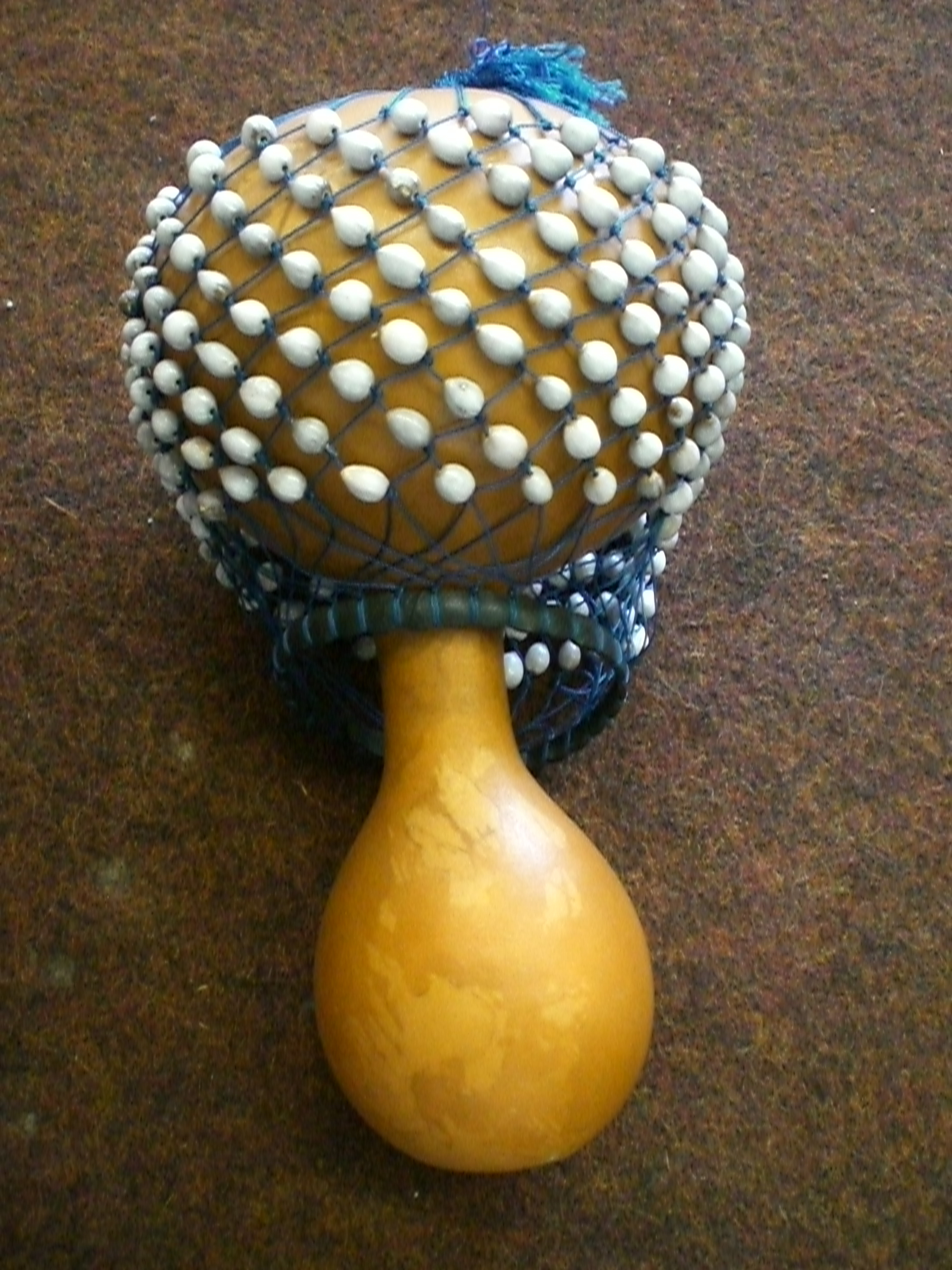
Axatse

The next instrument used in traditional Ewe drumming is called axatse (pronounced ah-hah-chay). The axatse is a rattle-like instrument made from a hollowed-out gourd covered with a net of seeds or beads. The axatse is usually played sitting down. It is held at the handle and in the players strong hand and is shaken up hitting the hand and down hitting the thigh making two different sounds. The axatse usually plays the same thing that the bell plays but with some extra added notes in between the beats. It can be described as the eighth note version of what the gankogui plays. It has also been described as enriching or reinforcing what the gankogui plays. Overall it gives energy to the music and drives the music. The axatse produces a dry rattling but energetic sound.

== Standard bell pattern and accompanying axatse part ==
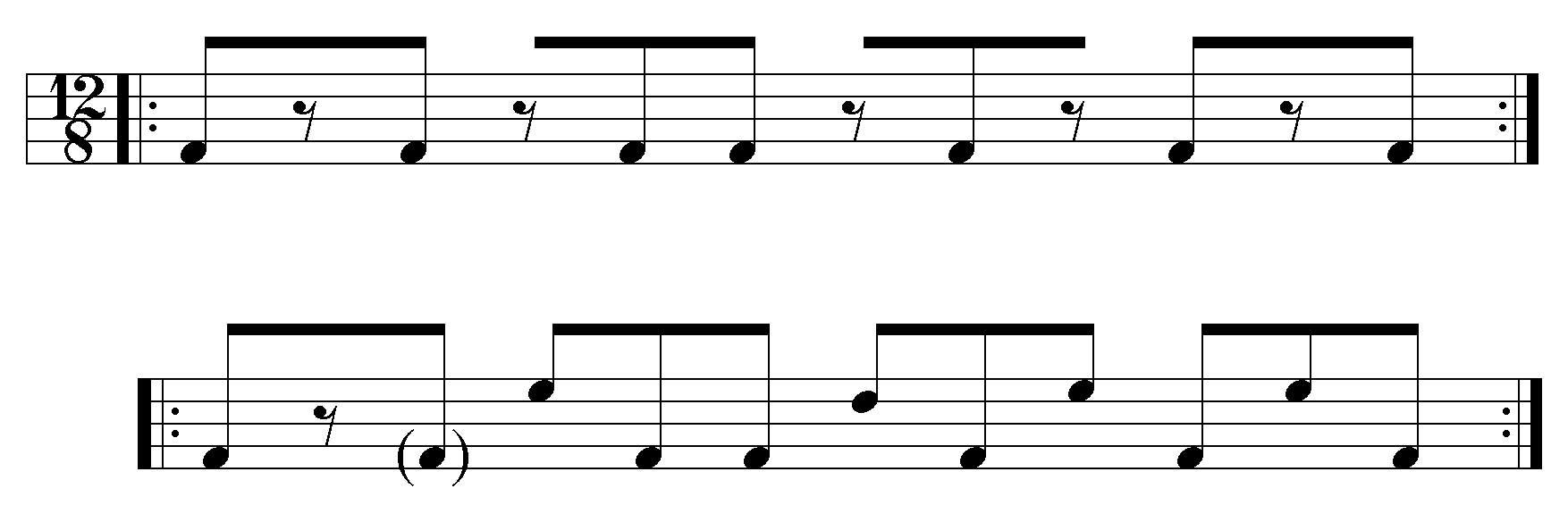
Standard bell pattern (top) with accompanying axatse part (bottom). The axatse begins on the second stroke (in parentheses)

The most common gankogui part is the 12-pulse basic Ewe, or standard pattern. The axatse part that accompanies the standard pattern is: "pa ti pa pa ti pa ti pa ti pa pa." The "pa's" sound the standard pattern by striking the gourd against the knee. The "ti's" sound pulses in between the bell strokes, by raising the gourd in an upward motion and striking it with the free hand. As is common with many African rhythms, the axatse part begins (first "pa") on the second stroke of the bell (1a), and the last "pa" coincides with 1. By ending on the beginning of the cycle, the axatse part contributes to the cyclic nature of the overall rhythm. See: standard bell with accompanying axatse part. Atsiagbekor.

== Master drums ==
In almost all West African drumming ensembles, a lead drum or master drum leads the group. The master drummer tells the ensemble when to play and when to stop, he also plays signals telling the other players to change the tempo or the drumming pattern. In some West African drumming ensembles, the master drummer is to play the main theme of the piece and improvise. In Ewe drumming, the master drummer does drum dialogue with the kidi. It enriches the kidi phrase by filling in the empty spaces on the kidi’s part. The master drum can also improvise.

In Ewe drumming, the term master drum is not limited to one particular type of drum. A master drum can be an atsimevu, sogo, kroboto, totodzi, or an agboba; these are the only types of drums used as master drums, however. Different master drums are used in different pieces. For example, if a group is playing "Agbadza" (an old Ewe war dance), the master drummer plays the sogo. The master drum techniques and playing styles are generally the same regardless of which drum is used.

=== Sogo ===
The basic master drum is called a sogo (pronounced "so-go)". Sogo is the drum that can always be a substitute for the master drum. It is also the actual "correct" master drum for some pieces. The sogo is a larger version of the kidi and is taller and fatter than the kidi. It can be played either with two wooden sticks, one hand and one stick, or both hands. This depends on the technique used in the piece being played. Depending on the piece, sometimes the sogo can play the same support role as the kidi. It produces a low tone and is usually played sitting down or standing up.

=== Atsimevu ===
Another master drum is called atsimevu (pronounced ah-chee-meh-voo). The atsimevu is the tallest of the Ewe drums. It is around 4½ feet tall. To play the atsimevu, the drummer must lean it over a stand called a vudetsi, stand on one side of the drum—and play it with either two wooden sticks or one hand and one stick. The atsimevu makes a middle range sound with some bass in the sound.

In the understanding of a drummer, a drumming stick is an extension of the hand. It remains under constant control in order to release only the desired frequency of vibration as it strikes the membrane. There are four types of stick drumming techniques in the art of master drumming, a basic technique and three variants of this technique. Each of these techniques produces a distinct pitch of the Atsimevu pitch series. . . In terms of a performance technique, the duration of resonance of a tone is normally controlled by damping the membrane at the periphery with a light but firm touch of the weak hand fingers. This technique is of prime importance in the articulation of the structure of a drum music or vugbe. It provides the means of indicating the basic motives, phrases and periods out of which the drum music is made—Ladzekpo (1995: web).

=== Agboba ===
A newer, lesser used master drum is called the agboba (pronounced ag-bo-bah or sometimes bo-bah). This drum was invented by the Ewe in the 1950s to play a newly invented piece called agahu. The agboba is the deepest sounding drum played by the Ewe. It has a fat body and is played leaning over on a stand similar to that for the atsimevu.

=== The Kloboto and Totodzi ===
The kloboto (pronounced klo-bo-toe) or totodzi (pronounced toe-toe-jee) are two more types of master drums, essentially the same, differing only in pitch. These are the smallest drums used by the Ewe. They measure lengthwise around eighteen inches. The two drums are not only used as master drums in some pieces but sometimes play the same role as the kidi. The kloboto and totodzi are always played with two wooden sticks, and their player is usually seated.

== Other drums ==
=== Kidi ===
The kidi is a mid-sized drum played with two wooden sticks. Like other Ewe drums, the drumhead is made of the skin of a deer or antelope. Its body is made out of wood and is sometimes decorated by elaborate carvings. It normally plays an eighth note pattern with some variation (e.g. a roll played instead of the first note of the phrase). The kidi does what is described by the Ewe as talking or conversing with lead drum. This is often called drum dialogue. The kidi often improvises a little bit at the appropriate times.

=== Kaganu ===
The kaganu is the smallest and highest pitched drum used by the Ewe, but its sound does incorporate some bass as well. It is around 20 inches tall. Like all Ewe drums, the kaganu has a drumhead made of antelope or deer skin. The body of the drum is made of wood and is often decorated with carvings. The kaganu is played with two long skinny wooden sticks, usually with the drummer sitting down. Like the gankokui and axatse, its pattern does not change for the duration of the piece. In Agahu, for example, the rhythm it plays are two notes on the upbeats. Because Agahu is played was in the 4/4 time, then the kaganu would play two notes on the "ands" of beats 1, 2, 3, and 4. The kaganu also gives energy and drive to the music.

== Tonal drumming ==
Like many West African drums, the master drum and sometimes the kidi have the ability to speak the language. Most African languages are tonal, so by producing different sounds at different pitches on the drum, the drummer can imitate the tones of the language. Some African drums can even imitate consonants by hitting the drum with a stick or hand at different angles and with different parts of the stick or hand. The Ewe also play a pair of two drums called atumpan (pronounced ah-toom-pahn), which are used all over Ghana as talking drums. The atumpan player stands up and plays the drum with two sticks shaped like an L.

In Anlo-Ewe cultural understanding, a drum is a super projection of the human voice. In this view, the role and power of the drum in play embodies the Sub-Saharan concept of combining natural forces of the universe in forming the supernaturals. In the composition of this conscious experience, human force is combined with other natural forces - skin of animal, hollowed solid tree-trunk, etc. - as a medium for arousing the attention and reaction of mankind. In a variety of tonal properties - pitch, timbre, intensity, and intricate rhythms - the drum and the drummer, in mutual cooperation, create patterns of consciousness that give a moment of inspiration to those they touch. Among the Anlo-Ewe, a legendary metaphor, ela kuku dea 'gbe wu la gbagbe means, "a dead animal cries louder than a live one," to explain the human experience that inspired the origins of the drum. A human being tendens to attract more attention when dead than when alive. So when the need came to communicate louder, a super voice surrogate was built out of a skin of a dead animal that could deliver the message louder and clearer—Ladzekpo (1995: web).

== Cross-rhythmic structure ==
The ethnomusicologist David Locke states: "Cross-rhythm pervades Ewe drumming." In fact, the overall rhythmic structure is generated through cross-rhythm. Cross-rhythm was first identified as the basis of sub-Saharan rhythm in the early writings of A.M. Jones, and was later explained in great detail in lectures by the Ewe master drummer and scholar C.K. Ladzekpo, and in the writings of Locke.

At the center of a core of rhythmic traditions within which the composer conveys his ideas is the technique of cross rhythm. The technique of cross rhythm is a simultaneous use of contrasting rhythmic patterns within the same scheme of accents or meter.

In Anlo-Ewe cultural understanding, the technique of cross rhythm is a highly developed systematic interplay of varying rhythmic motions simulating the dynamics of contrasting moments or emotional stress phenomena likely to occur in actual human existence.

As a preventive prescription for extreme uneasiness of mind or self-doubt about one's capacity to cope with impending or anticipated problems, these simulated stress phenomena or cross-rhythmic figures are embodied in the art of dance-drumming as mind-nurturing exercises to modify the expression of the inherent potential of the human thought in meeting the challenges of life. The premise is that by rightly instituting the mind in coping with these simulated emotional stress phenomena, intrepidity is achieved.

Intrepidness, or resolute fearlessness, in Anlo-Ewe view, is an extraordinary strength of mind. It raises the mind above the troubles, disorders, and emotions the anticipation or sight of great perils strives to excite. By this strength, ordinary people become heroes by maintaining themselves in a tranquil state of mind and preserving the free use of their reason under most surprising and terrible circumstances—Ladzekpo (1995: Web).

=== 3:2 (hemiola) ===
The most fundamental cross-rhythm in Ewe music, and Sub-Saharan African music traditions in general, is three-against-two (3:2), or six-against-four (6:4), also known as a vertical hemiola. The cycle of two or four beats are the main beat scheme, while the triple beat scheme is secondary. Ladzekpo states: "The term secondary beat scheme refers to a component beat scheme of a cross rhythm other than the main beat scheme. In a similar manner as a main beat, each secondary beat is distinguished by measuring off a distinct number of pulsations. A recurrent grouping of a number of these beats in a musical period forms a distinct secondary beat scheme."

We have to grasp the fact that if from childhood you are brought up to regard beating 3 against 2 as being just as normal as beating in synchrony, then you develop a two dimensional attitude to rhythm… This bi-podal conception is… part of the African's nature—Jones (1959: 102)

Novotney observes: "The 3:2 relationship (and [its] permutations) is the foundation of most typical polyrhythmic textures found in West African musics." 3:2 is the generative or theoretic form of sub-Saharan rhythmic principles. Agawu succinctly states: "[The] resultant [3:2] rhythm holds the key to understanding . . . there is no independence here, because 2 and 3 belong to a single Gestalt."

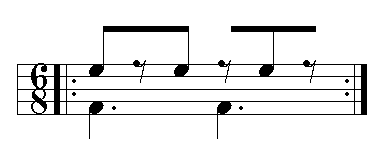
Three-over-two cross-rhythm.

=== 3:8 ===
The following bell pattern is used in the Ewe rhythm kadodo. The 24-pulse pattern crosses the barline, contradicting the meter with three sets of five strokes, across eight main beats (two measures of four main beats each). The three single strokes are muted.

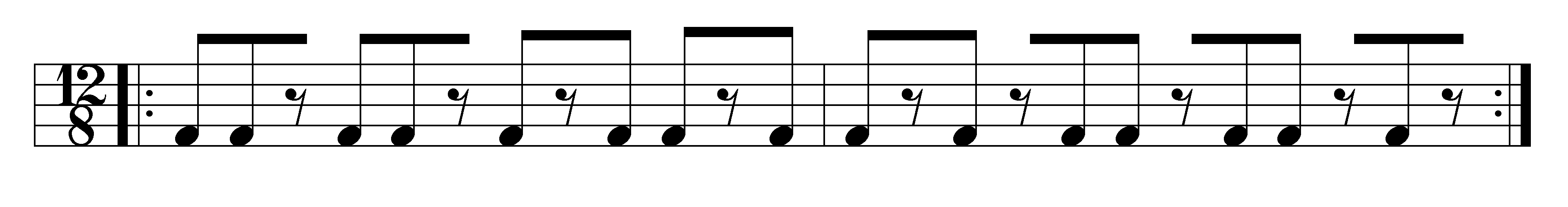
kadodo bell pattern

The kadodo bell pattern is an embellishment of three "slow" cross-beats spanning two measures, a type of macro "hemiola." The cross-rhythm is three-over-eight (3:8), or within the context of a single four-beat cycle (single measure), the ratio is 1.5:4. The three cross-beats are represented below as whole-notes for visual emphasis.

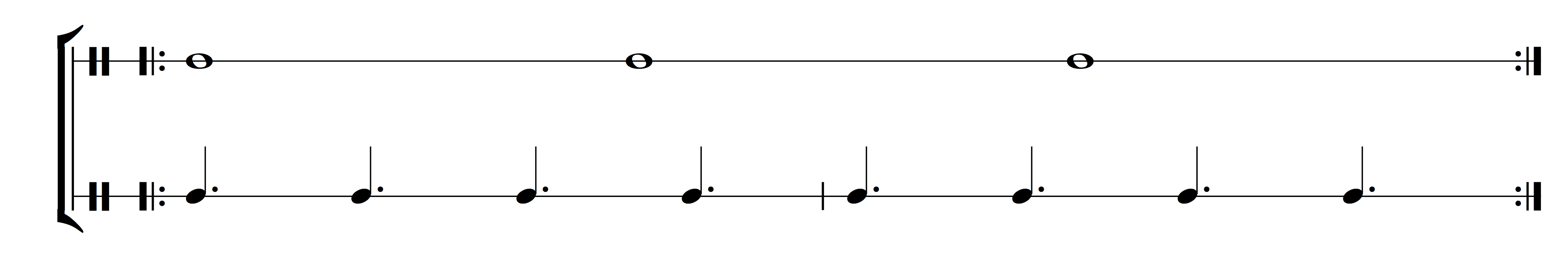
3:8 or 1.5:4

== See also ==
- Ewe music
- King Mensah Ewe musician
- Agbadza

== Other References ==
- Robert Ayitee, Kwashi Amevuvor, Ewe Master Drummers from Ghana, West Africa.
- Ladzekpo, CK. https://web.archive.org/web/20090415164952/http://bmrc.berkeley.edu/people/ladzekpo/Foundation.html Foundation Course in African-Dance Drumming. Drums and Drumming. 1995.
- Kinka: traditional songs from Avenorpedo
