= Individ =

Studio album by The Dodos
- Released: January 25, 2015
- Genre: Indie folk
- Length: 38:36
- Label: Polyvinyl

The Dodos chronology
Carrier (2013)	Individ (2015)	Certainty Waves (2018)

Professional ratings
Aggregate scores
Source	Rating
Metacritic	74/100
Review scores
Source	Rating
AllMusic	4/5 stars
The A.V. Club	B+
Consequence of Sound	B−
Exclaim!	7/10
musicOMH	3/5 stars
Pitchfork	7.2/10
PopMatters	8/10 stars

Individ is the sixth studio album by indie folk band The Dodos. It was released on Polyvinyl Records on January 27, 2015.

The album makes heavy use of the slide guitar of Meric Long, which was an element used in the band's embryonic days, but more sparingly on 2013's Carrier. It is marked from previous efforts likewise for its lack of involvement of high-profile producer Phil Ek, who worked on The Dodos' 2009 album Time to Die. Although released in early 2015, the band told Cheryl Waters of KEXP-FM during a studio performance and interview that they began recording Individ only a month after completing Carrier and before the latter had even been released. None of the songs on Individ were leftovers from the Carrier sessions and were all newly written in the studio.

== Track listing ==
1. "Precipitation" (6:10)
2. "The Tide" (3:25)
3. "Bubble" (3:12)
4. "Competition" (3:19)
5. "Darkness" (3:53)
6. "Goodbyes and Endings" (4:32)
7. "Retriever" (4:36)
8. "Bastard" (2:23)
9. "Pattern/Shadow" (7:06)
