= Eyelid (disambiguation) =

Eyelid is part of the eye.

- Eyelids (film), a Korean film
- "Eyelids", a song by The Dodos from Visiter 2008

== See also ==
- Eyelid Movies, album
