= Hemiolia =

Hemiolia can refer to:

- A type of galley developed in the 4th century BC
- A genus of the eukaryote clade Euglenida
- An alternative spelling for Hemiola, a musical pattern
