= Cross-beat =

Specific form of polyrhythm

In music, a cross-beat or cross-rhythm is a specific form of polyrhythm. The term cross rhythm was introduced in 1934 by the musicologist Arthur Morris Jones (1889–1980). It refers to a situation where the rhythmic conflict found in polyrhythms is the basis of an entire musical piece.

== Etymology ==
The term "cross rhythm" was introduced in 1934 by the musicologist Arthur Morris Jones (1889–1980), who, with Klaus Wachsmann, took-up extended residence in Zambia and Uganda, respectively, as missionaries, educators, musicologists, and museologists.

Cross-rhythm. A rhythm in which the regular pattern of accents of the prevailing meter is contradicted by a conflicting pattern and not merely a momentary displacement that leaves the prevailing meter fundamentally unchallenged.

— The New Harvard Dictionary of Music (1986: 216)

== African music ==
=== One main system ===
Niger-Congo linguistic group (yellow and yellow-green).

African cross-rhythm is most prevalent within the greater Niger-Congo linguistic group, which dominates the continent south of the Sahara Desert. (Kubik, p. 58) Cross-rhythm was first identified as the basis of sub-Saharan rhythm by A.M. Jones. Later, the concept was more fully explained in the lectures of Ewe master drummer and scholar C.K. Ladzekpo, and in the writings of David Locke. Jones observes that the shared rhythmic principles of Sub-Saharan African music traditions constitute one main system. Similarly, Ladzekpo affirms the profound homogeneity of sub-Saharan African rhythmic principles. In Sub-Saharan African music traditions (and many of the diaspora musics) cross-rhythm is the generating principle; the meter is in a permanent state of contradiction.

=== An embodiment of the people ===
At the center of a core of rhythmic traditions and composition is the technique of cross-rhythm. The technique of cross-rhythm is a simultaneous use of contrasting rhythmic patterns within the same scheme of accents or meter ... By the very nature of the desired resultant rhythm, the main beat scheme cannot be separated from the secondary beat scheme. It is the interplay of the two elements that produces the cross-rhythmic texture.

— Ladzekpo, a: "Myth"

From the philosophical perspective of the African musician, cross-beats can symbolize the challenging moments or emotional stress we all encounter. Playing cross-beats while fully grounded in the main beats, prepares one for maintaining a life-purpose while dealing with life’s challenges. Many sub-Saharan languages do not have a word for rhythm, or even music. From the African viewpoint, the rhythms represent the very fabric of life itself; they are an embodiment of the people, symbolizing interdependence in human relationships.

— Clave Matrix, p. 21

== Cross-rhythmic ratios ==
=== 3:2 ===
The cross-rhythmic ratio three-over-two (3:2) or vertical hemiola, is the most significant rhythmic cell found in sub-Saharan rhythms. The following measure is evenly divided by three beats and two beats. The two cycles do not share equal status though. The two bottom notes are the primary beats, the ground, the main temporal referent. The three notes above are the secondary beats. Typically, the dancer's feet mark the primary beats, while the secondary beats are accented musically.

Polyrhythm 3:2

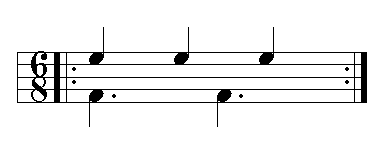
Additive

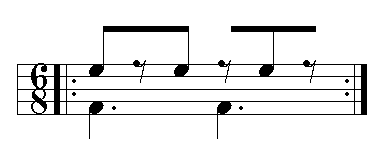
Divisive

Three-over-two cross-rhythm

Watch: Stepping to the main beats within 3:2 cross-rhythm. Afro-Cuban "Obatalá Dance" (Marta Ruiz) on YouTube

We have to grasp the fact that if from childhood you are brought up to regard beating 3 against 2 as being just as normal as beating in synchrony, then you develop a two dimensional attitude to rhythm... This bi-podal conception is... part of the African's nature

— Jones (1959: 102)

Novotney observes: "The 3:2 relationship (and [its] permutations) is the foundation of most typical polyrhythmic textures found in West African musics." 3:2 is the generative or theoretic form of sub-Saharan rhythmic principles. Agawu succinctly states: "[The] resultant [3:2] rhythm holds the key to understanding ... there is no independence here, because 2 and 3 belong to a single Gestalt."

African xylophones such as the balafon and gyil play cross-rhythms, which are often the basis of ostinato melodies. In the following example, a Ghanaian gyil sounds the three-against-two cross-rhythm. The left hand (lower notes) sounds the two main beats, while the right hand (upper notes) sounds the three cross-beats. (Clave Matrix p. 22)

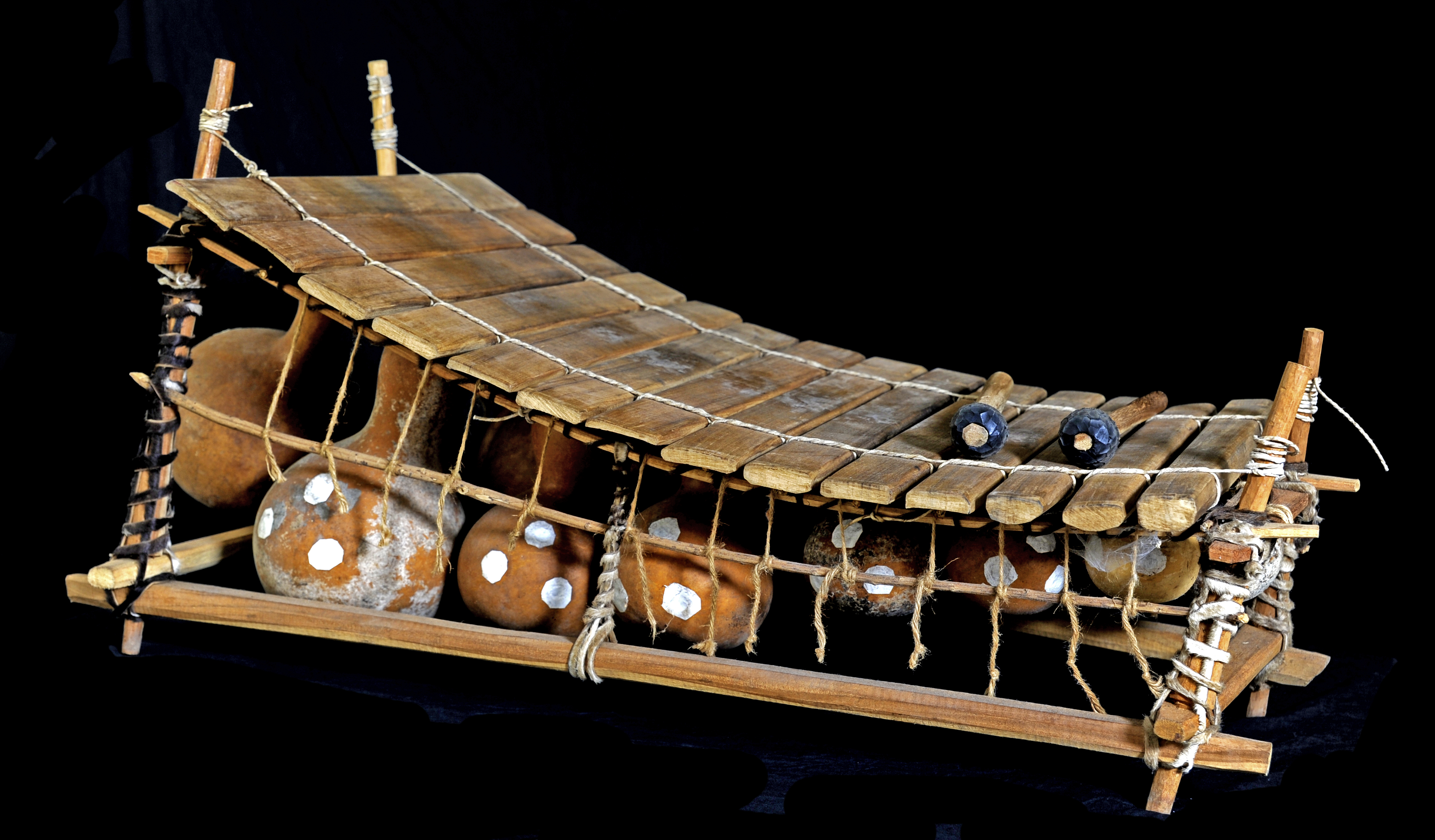
Ghanaian gyil

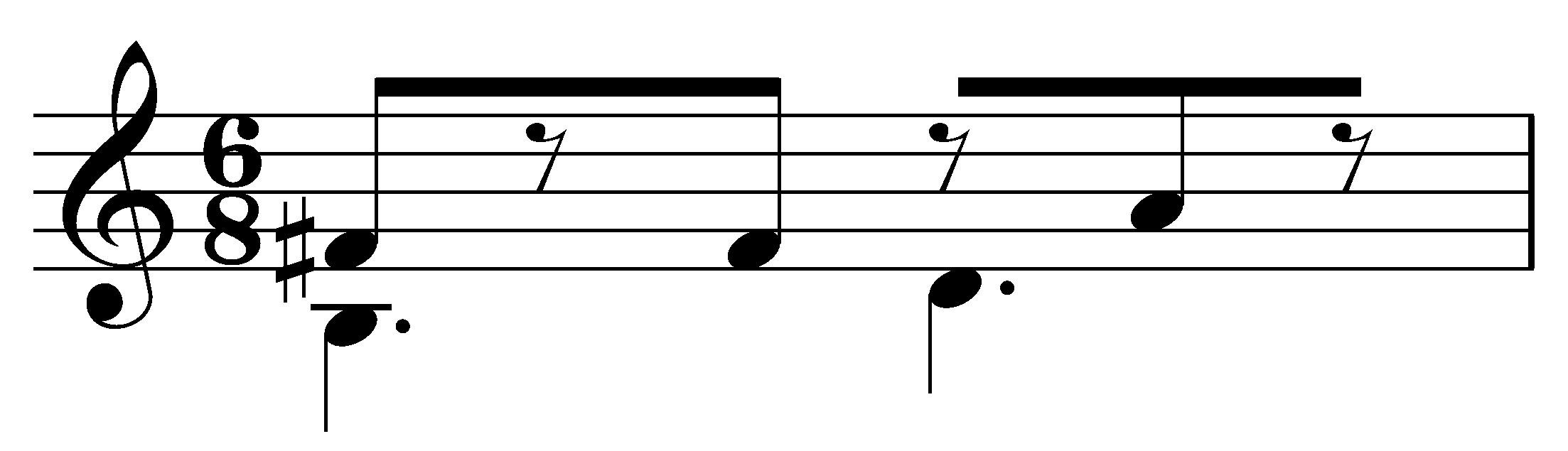
Ghanaian gyil sounds 3:2 cross-rhythm.

=== 6:4 ===
The primary cycle of four beats

Polyrhythm 6:4

A great deal of African music is built upon a cycle of four main beats. This basic musical period has a bipartite structure; it is made up of two cells, consisting of two beats each. Ladzekpo states: "The first most useful measure scheme consists of four main beats with each main beat measuring off three equal pulsations [12/8] as its distinctive feature ... The next most useful measure scheme consists of four main beats with each main beat flavored by measuring off four equal pulsations [4/4]." (b: "Main Beat Schemes") The four-beat cycle is a shorter period than what is normally heard in European music. This accounts for the stereotype of African music as "repetitive." (Kubik, p. 41) A cycle of only two main beats, as in the case of 3:2, does not constitute a complete primary cycle. (Kubik, Vol. 2, p. 63) Within the primary cycle there are two cells of 3:2, or, a single cycle of six-against-four (6:4). The six cross-beats are represented below as quarter-notes for visual emphasis.

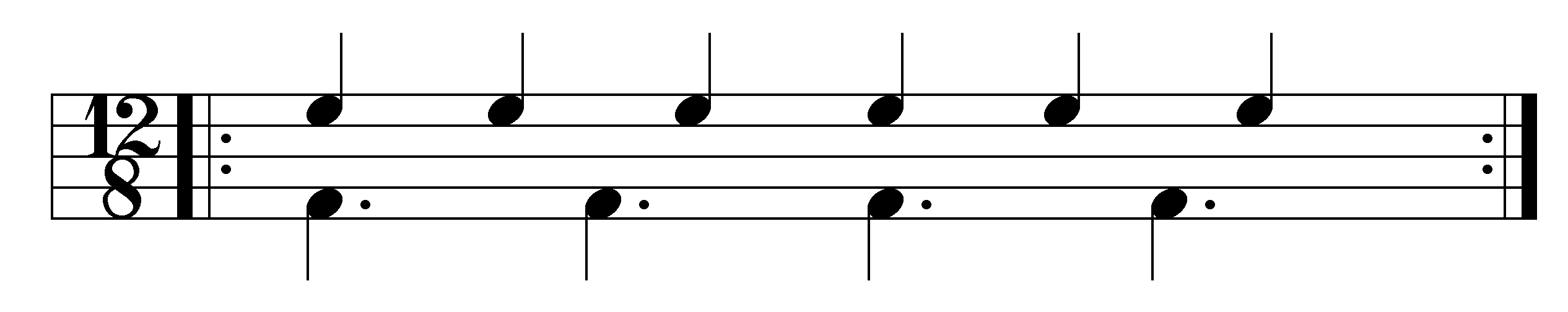
Six-against-four cross-rhythm (note that this is identical to the three-over-two cross-rhythm above, played twice).

Interacting the four recurrent triple structure main beat schemes (four beat scheme) simultaneously with the six recurrent two pulse beat schemes (six beat scheme) produces the first most useful cross rhythmic texture in the development of Anlo-Ewe dance-drumming.

— Ladzekpo (c: "Six Against Four")

The following notated example is from the kushaura part of the traditional mbira piece "Nhema Mussasa." The left hand plays the ostinato "bass line," built upon the four main beats, while the right hand plays the upper melody, consisting of six cross-beats. The composite melody is an embellishment of the 6:4 cross-rhythm. (Clave Matrix p. 35)

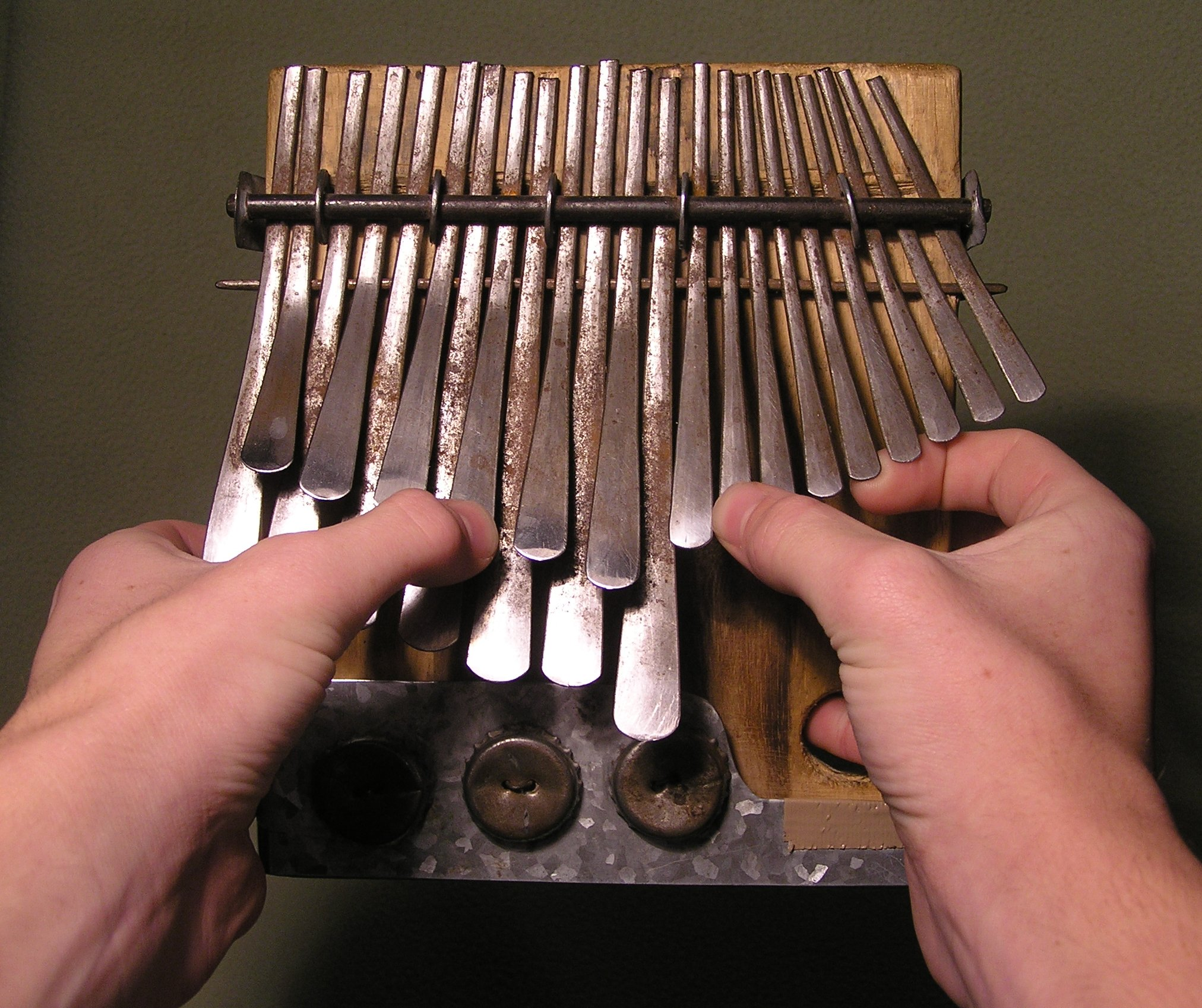
Holding an mbira dzavadzimu

=== 3:4 ===
Polyrhythm 3:4

If every other cross-beat is sounded, the three-against-four (3:4) cross-rhythm is generated. The "slow" cycle of three beats is more metrically destabilizing and dynamic than the six beats. The Afro-Cuban rhythm abakuá (Havana-style) is based on the 3:4 cross-rhythm. The three-beat cycle is represented as half-notes in the following example for visual emphasis.

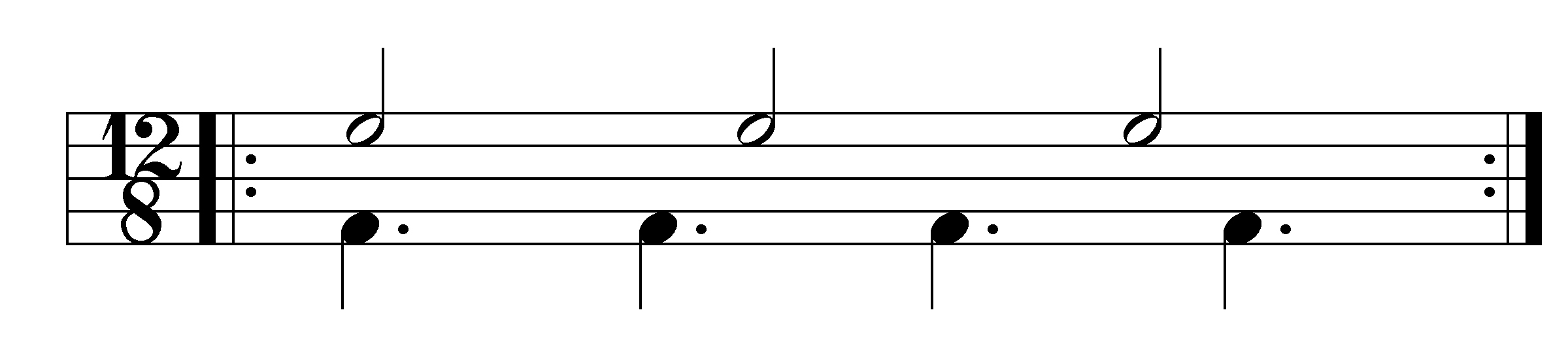
Three-against-four cross-rhythm.

In contrast to the four main beat scheme, the rhythmic motion of the three beat scheme is slower. A simultaneous interaction of these two beat schemes with contrasting rhythmic motions produces the next most useful cross rhythmic texture in the development of sub-Saharan dance-drumming. The composite texture of the three-against-four cross rhythm produces a motif covering a length of the musical period. The motif begins with the component beat schemes coinciding and continues with the beat schemes in alternate motions thus showing a progression from a "static" beginning to a "dynamic" continuation

— Ladzekpo ("Three Against Four")

The following pattern is an embellishment of the three-beat cycle, commonly heard in African music. It consists of three sets of three strokes each.

=== 1.5:4 (or 3:8) ===
Polyrhythm 4:1.5

Even more metrically destabilizing and dynamic than 3:4, is the one and a half beat-against-four (1.5:4) cross-rhythm. Another way to think of it is as three "very slow" cross-beats spanning two main beat cycles (of four beats each), or three beats over two periods (measures), a type of macro "hemiola." In terms of the beat scheme comprising the complete 24-pulse cross-rhythm, the ratio is 3:8. The three cross-beats are shown as whole notes below for visual emphasis.

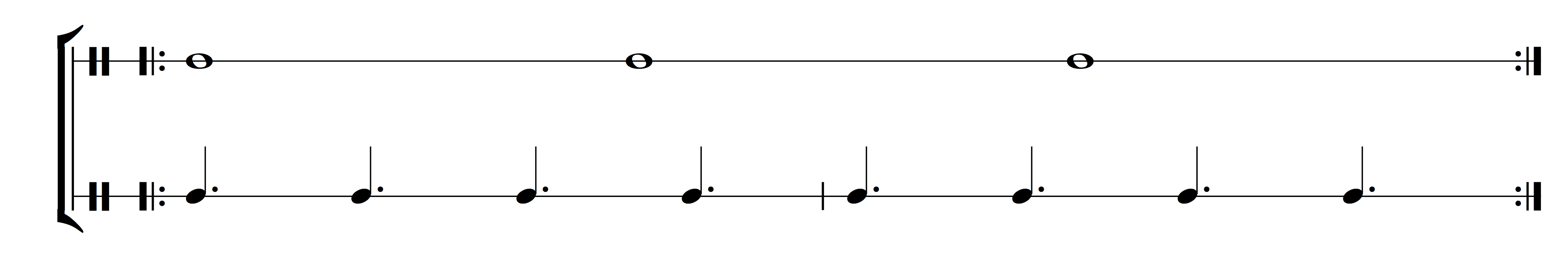
1.5:4 or 3:8.

The 1.5:4 cross-rhythm is the basis for the open tone pattern of the enú (large batá drum head) for the Afro-Cuban rhythm changó (Shango). (Note: "Changó," Ilu Aña and Regino Jiménez Album: Sacred Rhythms, Bembe CD 2027-2 (1994) OCLC 460783709, 858557089, 33976057, OCLC 30784345) It is the same pattern as the previous figure, but the strokes occur at half the rate.

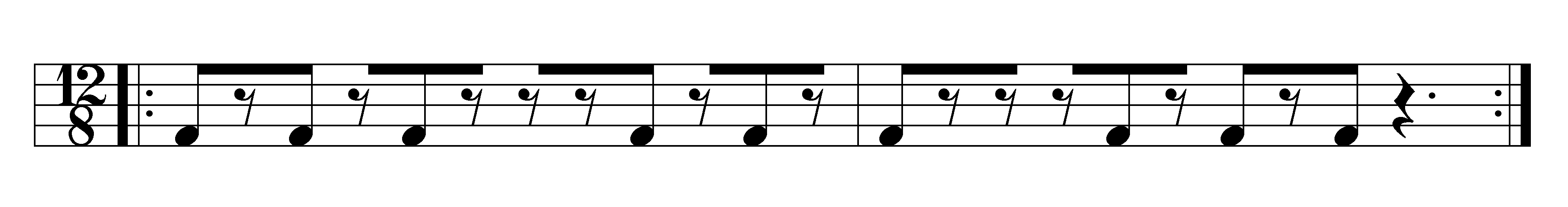
Drum pattern based on 1.5:4 cross-rhythm.

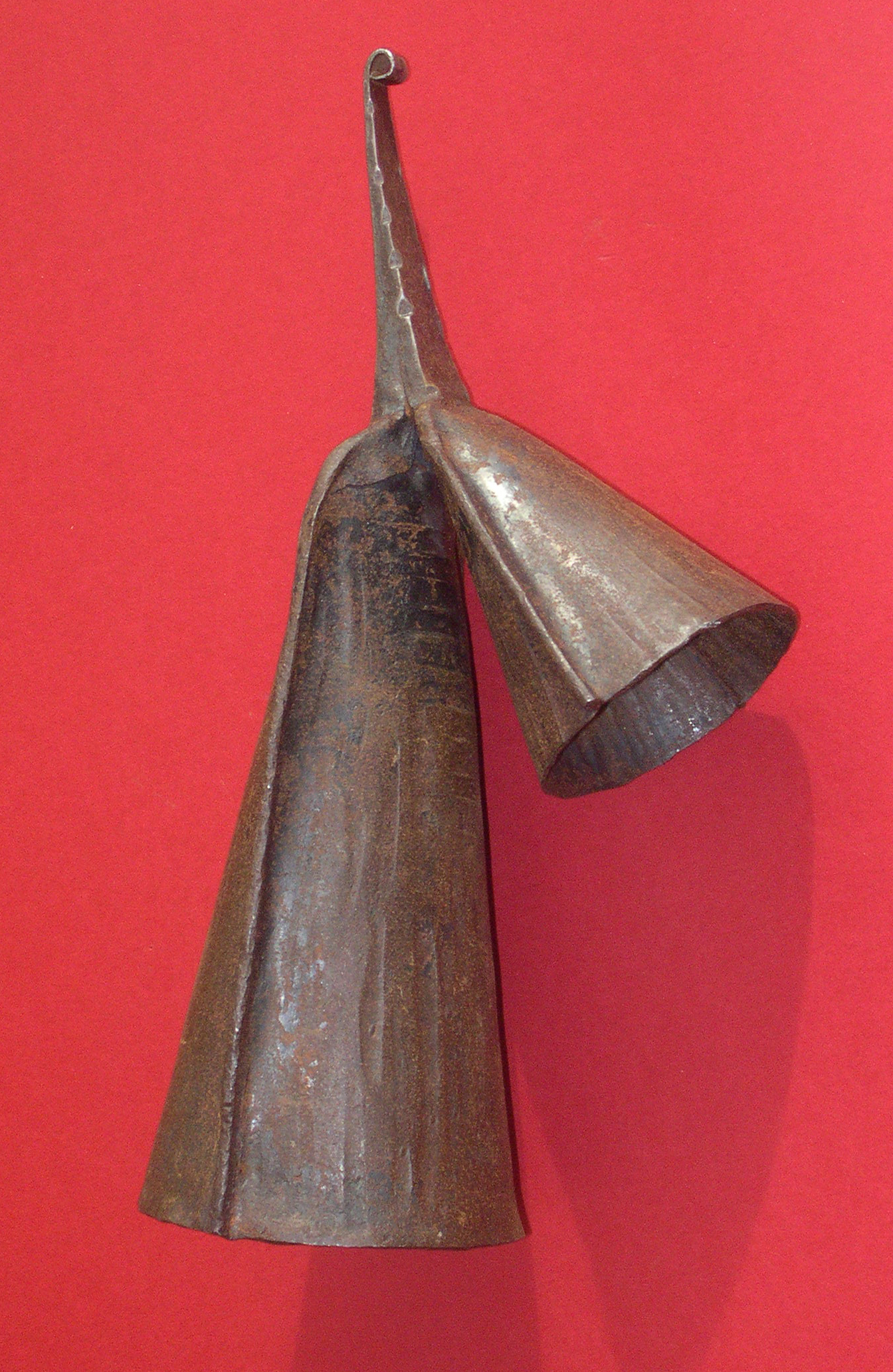
Ewe gankoqui bell

The following bell pattern is used in the Ewe rhythm kadodo. The pattern consists of three modules—two pairs of strokes, and a single stroke. The three single stroke are muted. The pattern is another embellishment of the 1.5:4 cross-rhythm.

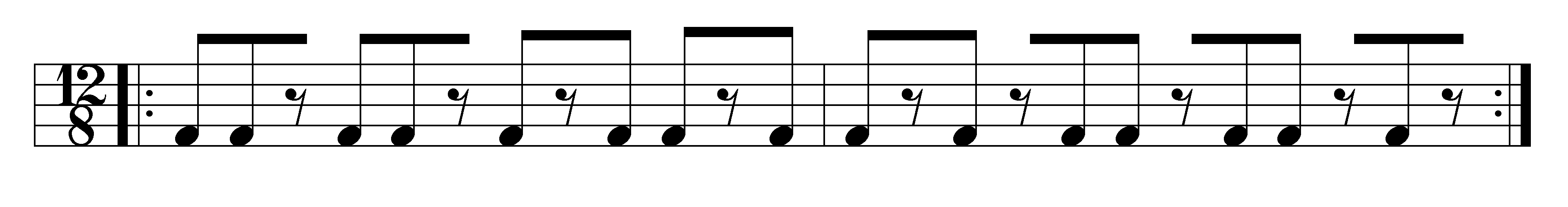
kadodo bell pattern

=== 4:3 ===
When duple pulses (4/4) are grouped in sets of three, the four-against-three (4:3) cross-rhythm is generated. The four cross-beats cycle every three main beats. In terms of cross-rhythm only, this is the same as having duple cross-beats in a triple beat scheme, such as 3/4 or 6/4. The pulses on the top line are grouped in threes for visual emphasis.

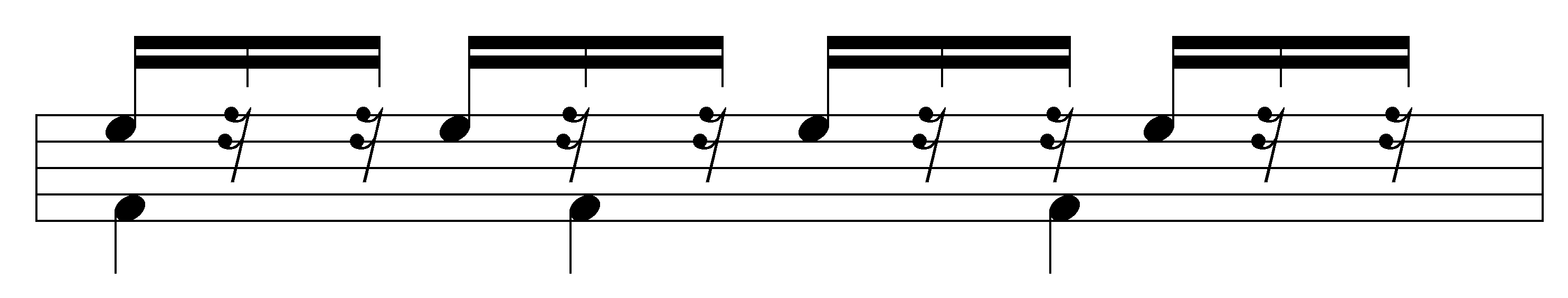
4:3 cross-rhythm in modular form.

However, this 4:3 is within a duple beat scheme, with duple (quadruple) subdivisions of the beats. Since the musical period is a cycle of four main beats, the 4:3 cross-rhythm significantly contradicts the period by cycling every three main beats. The complete cross-beat cycle is shown below in relation to the key pattern known in Afro-Cuban music as clave. (Rumba, p. xxxi) The subdivisions are grouped (beamed) in sets of four to reflect the proper metric structure. The complete cross-beat cycle is three claves in length. Within the context of the complete cross-rhythm, there is a macro 4:3—four 4:3 modules-against-three claves. Continuous duple-pulse cross-beats are often sounded by the quinto, the lead drum in the Cuban genres rumba and conga. (Rumba, pps. 69–86) (Note: "Cantar Maravilloso" ("Wonderful Song") (at 2:24), Los Muñequitos de Matanzas (originally known as Grupo Guaguancó Matancero) Album: Guaguancó Vol. 2, Grupo Guaguancó Matancero, Antilla MLP 595 (1958) Original release: Puchito SP 103 (LP)) (Note: "Los Beodos" ("The Drunk") (side A, 2nd track, at 2:11), Los Muñequitos de Matanzas (originally known as Grupo Guaguancó Matancero) Album: Guaguancó, Vol. 1, Grupo Guaguancó Matancero, Puchito MLP 565 (1956) OCLC 14715894; OCLC 431807544)

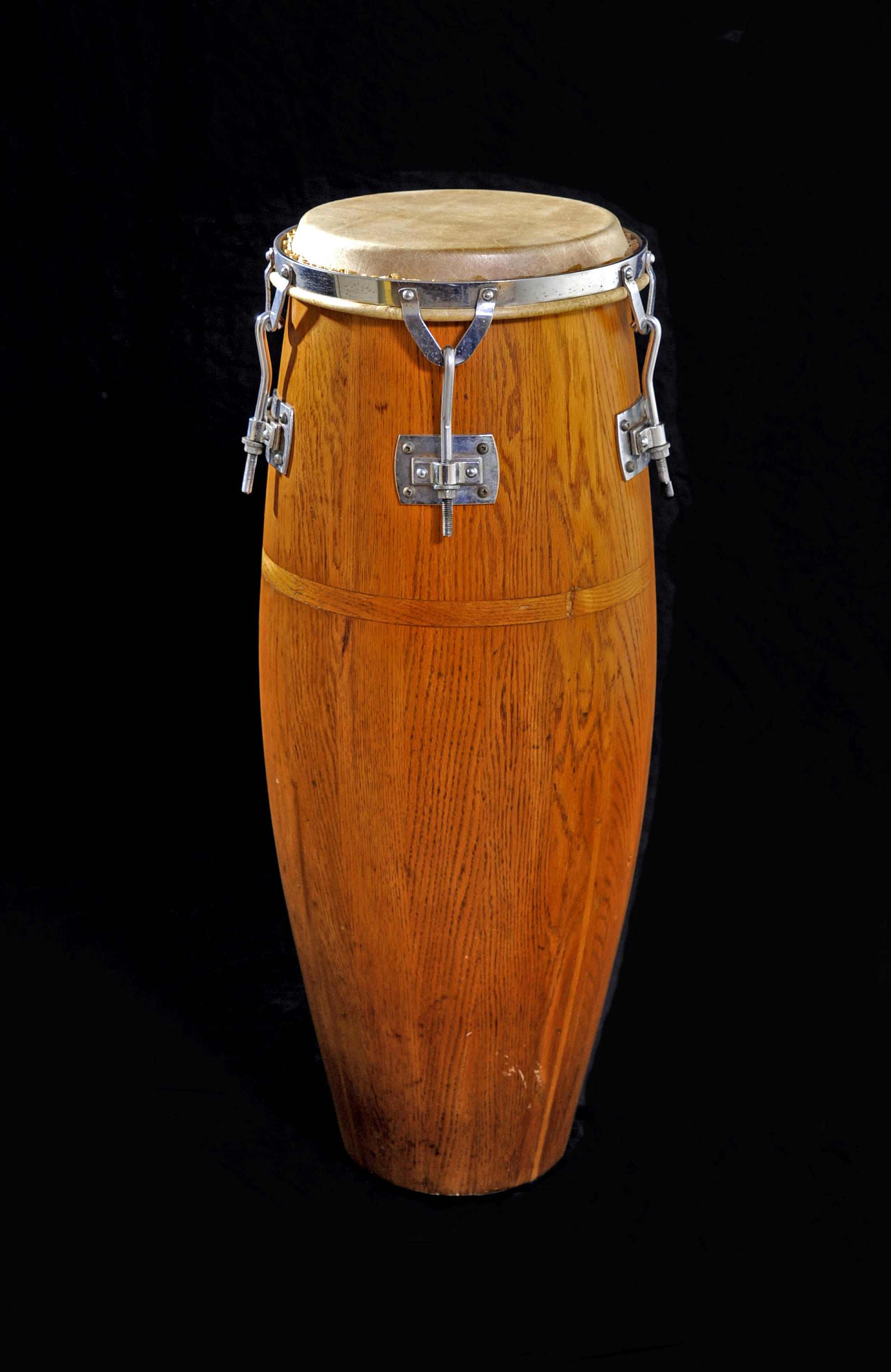
Quinto drum

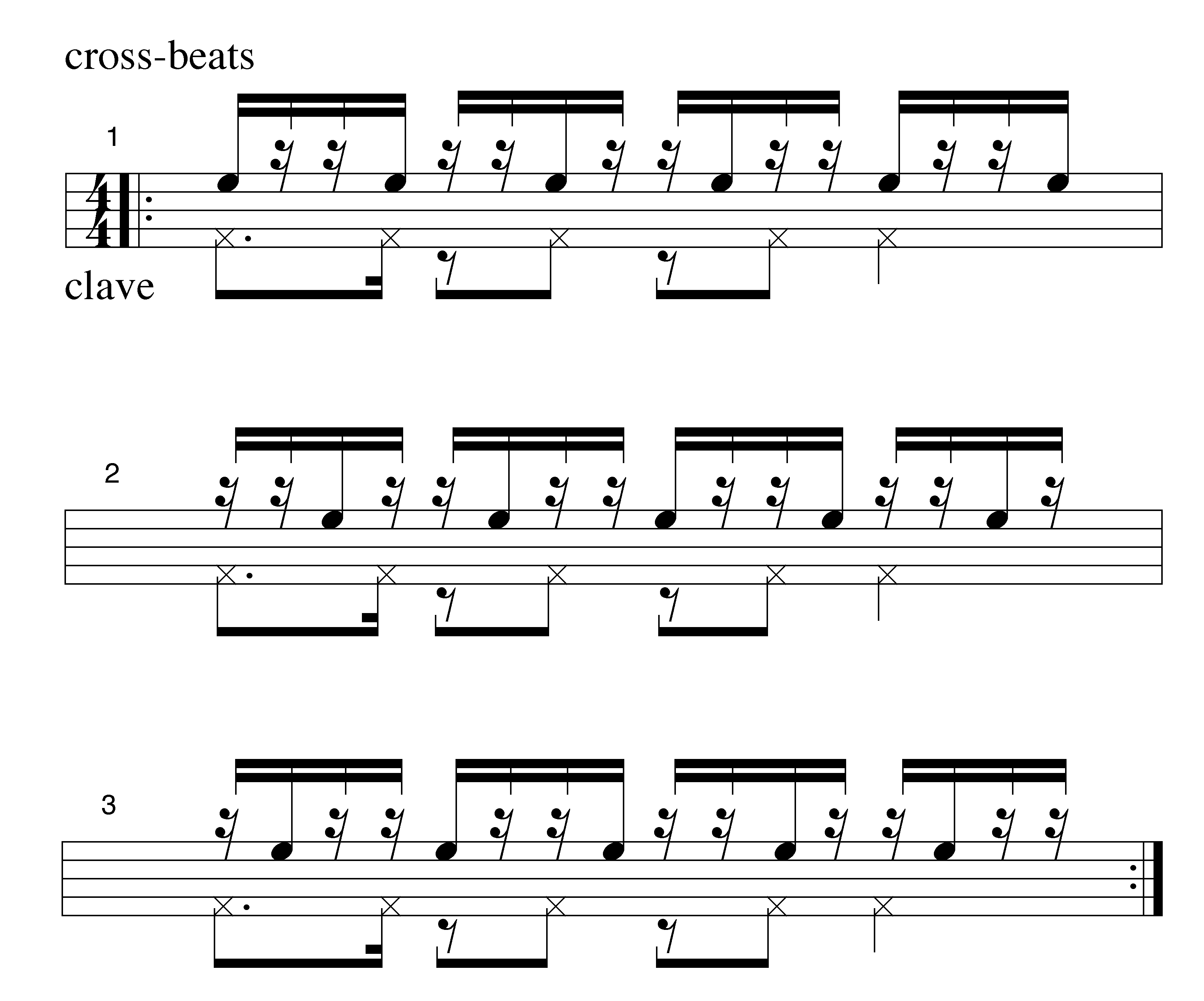
Complete cycle of 4:3 cross-rhythm shown in relation to clave.

While 3:2 pervades ternary music, quaternary music seldom uses tuplets; instead, a set of dotted notes may temporarily make 2:3 and 4:3 temporal structures.

— Locke ("Metric Matric")

== Duple-pulse correlative of 3:2 ==
In sub-Saharan rhythm the four main beats are typically divided into three or four pulses, creating a 12-pulse (12/8), or 16-pulse (4/4) cycle. (Ladzekpo, b: "Main Beat Scheme") Every triple-pulse pattern has its duple-pulse correlative; the two pulse structures are two sides of the same coin. Cross-beats are generated by grouping pulses contrary to their given structure, for example: groups of two or four in 12/8 or groups of three or six in 4/4. (Rumba, p. 180) The duple-pulse correlative of the three cross-beats of the hemiola, is a figure known in Afro-Cuban music as tresillo. Tresillo is a Spanish word meaning ‘triplet’—three equal notes within the same time span normally occupied by two notes. As used in Cuban popular music, tresillo refers to the most basic duple-pulse rhythmic cell. The pulse names of tresillo and the three cross-beats of the hemiola are identical: one, one-ah, two-and.

The composite pattern of tresillo and the main beats is commonly known as the habanera, congo, tango-congo, or tango. The habanera rhythm is the duple-pulse correlative of the vertical hemiola (above). The three cross-beats of the hemiola are generated by grouping triple pulses in twos: 6 pulses ÷ 2 = 3 cross-beats. Tresillo is generated by grouping duple pulses in threes: 8 pulses ÷ 3 = 2 cross-beats (consisting of three pulses each), with a remainder of a partial cross-beat (spanning two pulses). In other words, 8 ÷ 3 = 2, r2. Tresillo is a cross-rhythmic fragment. It contains the first three cross-beats of 4:3. (Rumba, p. xxx)

Tresillo over two Video

== Cross-rhythm, not polymeter ==
Early ethnomusicological analysis often perceived African music as polymetric. Pioneers such as A.M. Jones and Anthony King identified the prevailing rhythmic emphasis as metrical accents (main beats), instead of the contrametrical accents (cross-beats) they in fact are. Some of their music examples are polymetric, with multiple and conflicting main beat cycles, each requiring its own separate time signature. King shows two Yoruba dundun pressure drum ("talking drum") phrases in relation to the five-stroke standard pattern, or "clave," played on the kagano dundun (top line). The standard pattern is written in a polymetric 7/8 + 5/8 time signature. One dundun phrase is based on a grouping of three pulses written in 3/8, and the other, a grouping of four pulses written in 4/8. Complicating the transcription further, one polymetric measure is offset from the other two.

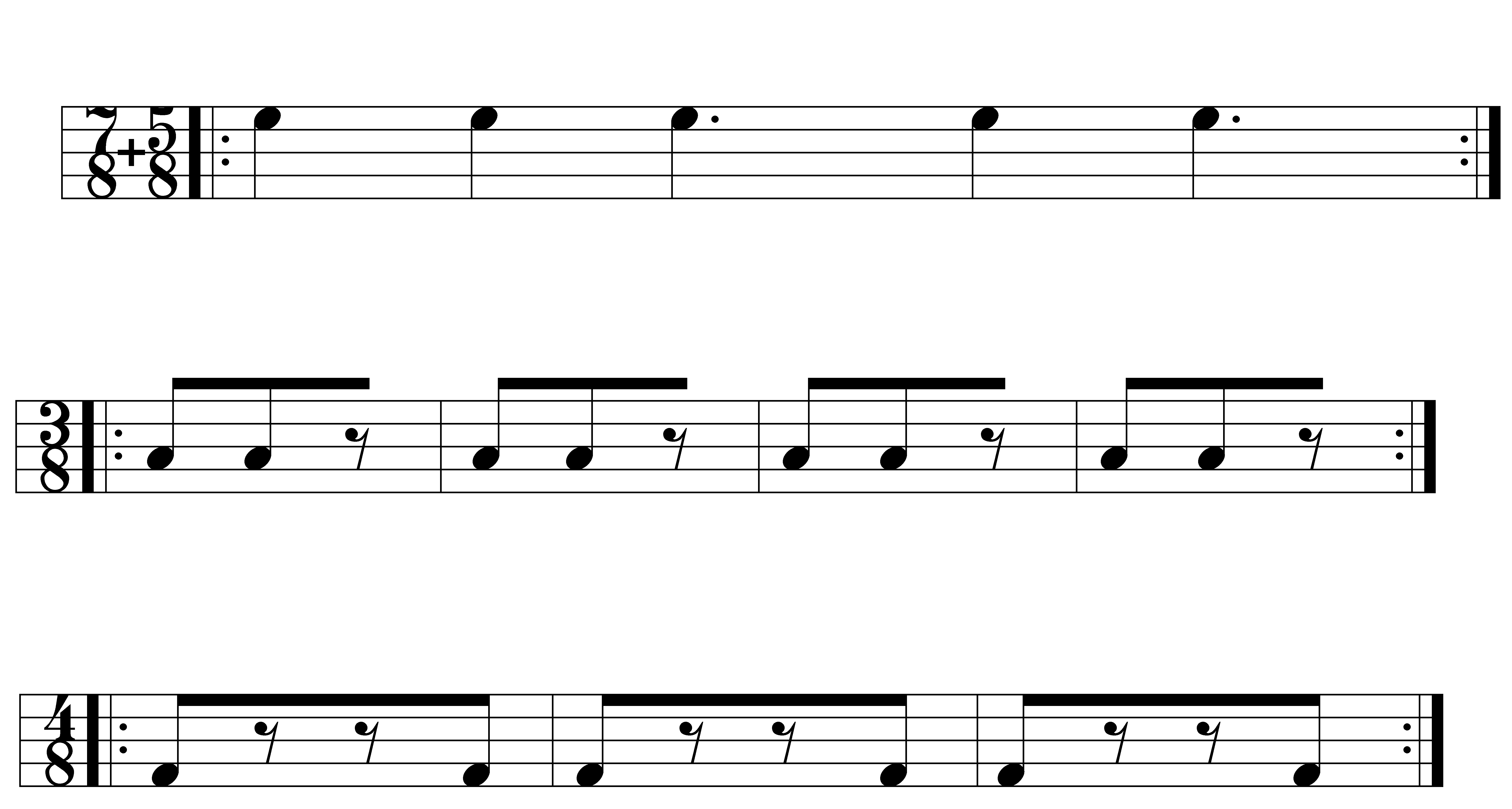
Dundun drum ensemble represented as polymeter.

African music is often characterized as polymetric, because, in contrast to most Western music, African music cannot be notated without assigning different meters to the different instruments of an ensemble

— Chernoff (1979: 45).

More recent writings represent African music as cross-rhythmic, within a single meter.

Of the many reasons why the notion of polymeter must be rejected, I will mention three. First, if polymeter were a genuine feature of African music, we would expect to find some indication of its pertinence in the discourses and pedagogical schemes of African musicians, carriers of the tradition. As far as I know, no such data is available...Second, because practically all the ensemble music in which polymeter is said to be operative in dance music, and given the grounding demanded by choreography, it is more likely that these musics unfold within polyrhythmic matrices in single meters rather than in ... "mixed" meters ... Third, decisions about how to represent drum ensemble music founder on the assumption, made most dramatically by Jones, that accents are metrical rather than phenomenal...phenomenal accents play a more important role in African music than metrical accents. Because meter and grouping are distinct, postulating a single meter in accordance with the dance allows phenomenal or contrametric accents to emerge against a steady background. Polymeter fails to convey the true accentual structure of African music insofar as it creates the essential tension between a firm and stable background and a fluid foreground

— Agawu (2003: 84, 85).

[The] term ‘polymetric’ is only applicable to a very special kind of phenomenon. If we take "metre" in its primary sense of metrum (the metre being the temporal reference unit), ‘polymetric’ would describe the simultaneous unfolding of several parts in a single work at different tempos so as not to be reducible to a single metrum. This happens in some modern music, such as some of Charles Ives' works, Elliott Carter’s Symphony, B.A. Zimmermann’s opera "Die Soldaten," and Pierre Boulez’s "Rituel." Being polymetric in the strict sense, these works can only be performed with several simultaneous conductors

— Arom (1991: 205).

When written within a single meter, we see that the dundun in the second line sounds the main beats, and the subdivision immediately preceding it. The first cell (half measure) of the top line is a hemiola. The two dunduns shown in the second and third lines sound an embellishment of the three-over-four (3:4) cross-rhythm—expressed as three pairs of strokes against four pairs of strokes. (Clave Matrix p. 216)

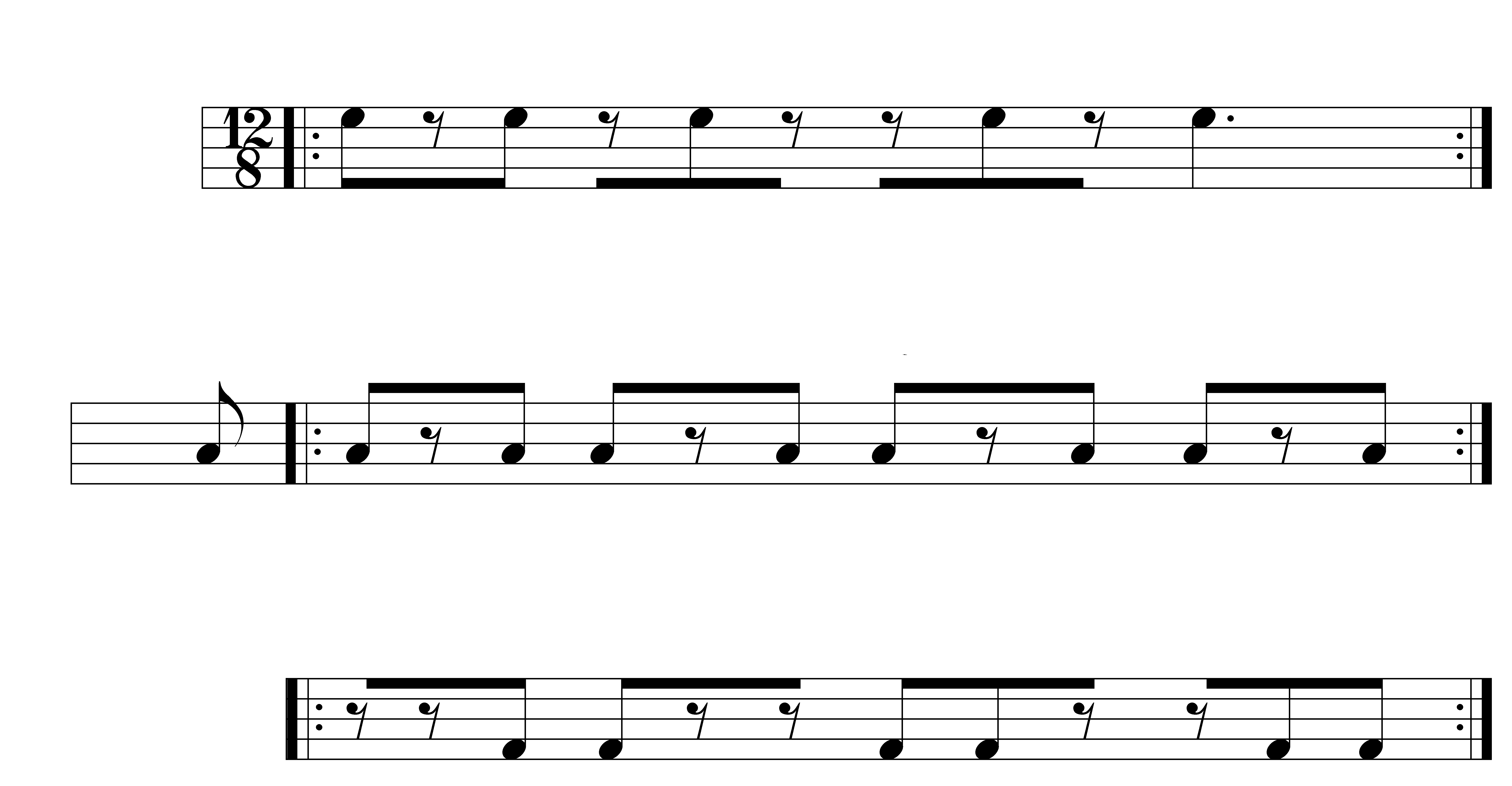
Dundun drum ensemble represented as cross-rhythm within a single meter.

== Adaptive instruments ==
Sub-Saharan instruments are constructed in a variety of ways to generate cross-rhythmic melodies. Some instruments organize the pitches in a uniquely divided alternate array – not in the straight linear bass to treble structure that is so common to many western instruments such as the piano, harp, and marimba.

Lamellophones including mbira, mbila, mbira huru, mbira njari, mbira nyunga, marimba, karimba, kalimba, likembe, and okeme. These instruments are found in several forms indigenous to different regions of Africa and most often have equal tonal ranges for right and left hands. The kalimba is a modern version of these instruments originated by the pioneer ethnomusicologist Hugh Tracey in the early 20th century which has over the years gained world-wide popularity.

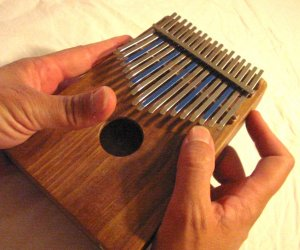
Hugh Tracey treble kalimba

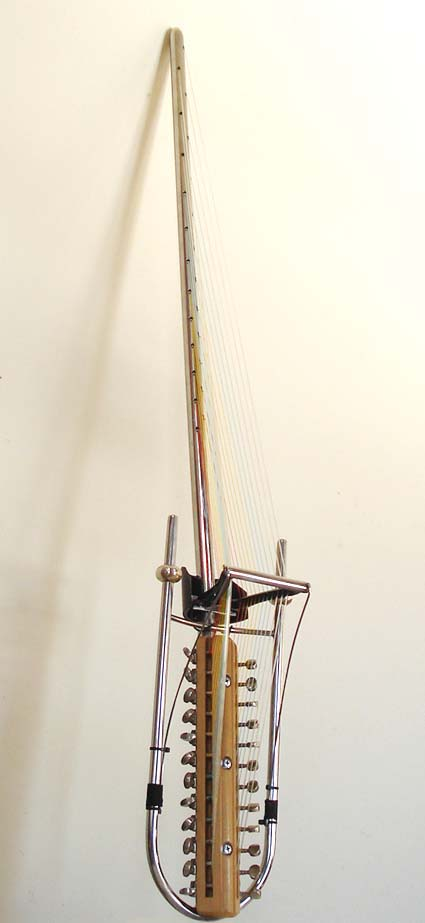
Signature Series Gravikord

Chordophones, such as the West African kora, and Doussn'gouni, part of the harp-lute family of instruments, also have this African separated double tonal array structure. Another instrument, the Marovany from Madagascar is a double sided box zither which also employs this divided tonal structure. The Gravikord is a new American instrument closely related to both the African kora and the kalimba. It was created to exploit this adaptive principle in a modern electro-acoustic instrument.

== Jazz ==
The New Harvard Dictionary of Music calls swing "an intangible rhythmic momentum in jazz," adding that "swing defies analysis; claims to its presence may inspire arguments." The only specific description offered is the statement that "triplet subdivisions contrast with duple subdivisions." The argument could be made that by nature of its simultaneous triple and duple subdivisions, swing is fundamentally a form of polyrhythm. However, the use of true systematic cross-rhythm in jazz did not occur until the second half of the twentieth century.

=== 3:2 (or 6:4) ===
In 1959 Mongo Santamaria recorded "Afro Blue," the first jazz standard built upon a typical African 3:2 cross-rhythm. (Note: "Afro Blue," Mongo Santamaria Album: Afro Roots, Fantasy 8032 (1959) OCLC 29751149, 3209055, 20288150) The song begins with the bass repeatedly playing 3 cross-beats per each measure of 6/8 (3:2), or 6 cross-beats per 12/8 measure (6:4). The following example shows the original ostinato "Afro Blue" bass line. The slashed noteheads are not bass notes, but are shown to indicate the main beats, where you would normally tap your foot to "keep time."

=== 3:4 ===
On the original "Afro Blue," drummer Willie Bobo played an abakuá bell pattern on a snare drum, using brushes. This cross-rhythmic figure divides the twelve-pulse cycle into three sets of four pulses. Since the main beats (four sets of three pulses) are present whether sounded or not, this bell pattern can be considered an embellishment of the three-against-four (3:4) cross-rhythm. Bobo used this same pattern and instrumentation on the Herbie Hancock jazz-descarga "Succotash." (Note: "Succotash," Herbie Hancock Album: Inventions and Dimensions Blue Note CD 84147-2 (1963) OCLC 20227090, 874388051 Recorded at the Van Gelder Studio, Englewood Cliffs, New Jersey, August 30, 1963 Herbie Hancock (piano), Paul Chambers (bass), Willie Bobo (drums, timbales), Osvaldo "Chihuahua" Martinez (conga, bongo))

=== 2:3 ===
In 1963 John Coltrane recorded "Afro Blue" with the jazz drummer Elvin Jones. (Note: "Afro Blue", YouTube, John Coltrane Quartet Album: Afro Blue Impressions Pablo-Live (G)PL2620-101 (1977) OCLC 173207839 Live, Auditorium Maximum, Free University of Berlin, November 2, 1963 John Coltrane (soprano & tenor sax), McCoy Tyner (piano), Jimmy Garrison (bass), Elvin Jones (drums) Archived February 17, 2007, at the Wayback Machine) Jones inverted the metric hierarchy of Santamaria's composition, performing it instead as duple cross-beats over a 3/4 "jazz waltz" (2:3). This 2:3 in a swung 3/4 is perhaps the most common example of overt cross-rhythm in jazz. (Note: "Jazz Drumming in 3/4" (part 2), by Conor Guilfoyle, YouTube Guilfoyle demonstrates 2:3 cross-rhythm in 3/4 swing.)

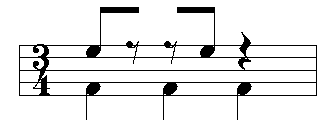
Two-over-three (2:3).

=== Duple-pulse correlative of 3:2 ===
The Wayne Shorter composition "Footprints" may have been the first overt expression of the 6:4 cross-rhythm (two cycles of 3:2) used by a straight ahead jazz group. (Note: "Footprints," Miles Davis Quintet Album: Miles Smiles, Columbia CS 9401; CD (1967) OCLC 872563570, 41265755, 872667474 Recorded 1966 October 24–25, 1966, Columbia 30th Street Studio, New York City Miles Davis (trumpet), Wayne Shorter (tenor sax), Herbie Hancock (piano), Ron Carter (bass), Tony Williams (drums)) On the version recorded on Miles Smiles by Miles Davis, the bass switches to 4/4 at 2:20. The 4/4 figure is known as tresillo in Latin music and is the duple-pulse correlative of the cross-beats in triple-pulse. Throughout the piece, the four main beats are maintained. In the example below, the main beats are indicated by slashed noteheads. They are shown here for reference and do not indicate bass notes.

In recent decades, jazz has incorporated many different types of complex cross-rhythms, as well as other types of polyrhythms.

== See also ==
- Hemiola
- Syncopation
