= Symphonic cycle =

A symphonic song cycle can either refer to a symphony composed of separate movements played consecutively or to a set of symphonic works linked by theme, common composer, or common conductor. A symphonic cycle should not be confused with the closely related song cycle.

== Symphonic cycle as a whole symphonic work ==
A symphony is essentially cyclic in nature, typically containing four interconnected movements as part of a larger work. At first the movements of a symphony were meant to be distributed among other works – arias, overtures, concertos – in extended evening social events at which music served a background or occasionally center role. The movements were meant to be connected and identified as part of the symphonic cycle through recall and quotation of earlier movements, and the finale movement meant to be seen as a destination and recap. It was not until Beethoven that a symphonic cycle came to be seen as a work needing isolated, consecutive play of the constituent movements.

== Symphonic cycle as a set of works ==
A symphonic cycle may also refer to a set of symphonies linked through a common composer or conductor. For example, the symphonic repertoire of Ludwig van Beethoven, consisting of his nine numbered symphonies, may be wholly referred to as the Beethoven symphonic cycle. Another conception of the symphonic cycle is that of a set of composer's works as performed and recorded on audio/visual media by a common conductor. This practice came into existence with the establishment of audio record companies in the 1920s.

A symphonic cycle of particular note is that of Leonard Bernstein's first attempt at providing recordings for the complete symphonic works of Gustav Mahler. The Bernstein–Mahler cycle became an advertising mechanism by which Bernstein championed the revival and critical acceptance of Mahler's music during the 1960s and '70s. Symphonic cycles of various composers are now recorded and sold in this sort of fashion featuring complete sets rendered by a common conductor or performing group.
