= Cycle (music) =

In music, a cycle can be several things. Acoustically, it is one complete vibration, the base unit of Hertz being one cycle per second. Theoretically, an interval cycle is a collection of pitch classes created by a sequence of identical intervals. Cycles are also individual pieces of larger works, like the movements in a suite, symphony sonata, or string quartet. This can range from settings of the Mass or a song cycle to an opera cycle. Another cycle is the complete performance of an individual composer's work in one genre.

Harmonic cycles—repeated sequences of a harmonic progression—are at the root of many musical genres, such as the twelve-bar blues. In compositions of this genre, the chord progression may be repeated indefinitely, with melodic and lyrical variation forming the musical interest. The form theme and variations is essentially of this type, but generally on a larger scale.

Composition using a tone row is another example of a cycle of pitch material, although it may be more difficult to hear because the variations are more diverse.

== Rhythmic cycles ==
=== Indian classical music ===
In Indian classical music, a specific rhythmic structure known as a tala is repeated through the length of the raga, and used as a basis for improvisation of the drum parts.

=== Music of Indonesia ===
In the gamelan music of Indonesia, there are nested gong cycles which determine the rhythmic framework of the piece. This sort of cycling is called colotomy. In the same way as specific harmonic cycles determine the genre of many Western pieces (like the blues), gamelan pieces are classified according to their colotomic structures. Some other styles of music, such as gagaku or pi phat, have been analyzed colotomically.

=== Sub-Saharan African music traditions ===
Rhythm in Sub-Saharan Africa is typically generated by multiple cross-rhythmic cycles, in relation to a primary cycle of four main beats. This basic musical period has a bipartite structure; it comprises two rhythmically opposed cells of two beats each. The four-beat cycle is a shorter period than in European music. This explains the stereotype of African music as "repetitive". The cycles have a beginning and an end, with the two joining. The lead instrument, or soloist, may temporarily contradict the primary cycle with cross beats and larger phrases, but awareness of the cycle is ever-present. In many sub-Saharan and Disapora musics, a key pattern, typically played on a bell, establishes the basic cycle or period.

== Mixed cycles ==
Different types of musical cycles can overlap. One example is isorhythm, the medieval practice of using melodic and rhythmic cycles in one or two voices. There is a certain sequence of pitch material (known as the color) and a separate sequence of rhythmic values (known as the talea), which has a different length. If the lengths of the two cycles are relatively prime, a complex melody will emerge. Most compositions using this technique end when the two cycles coincide.

A similar process is used in serial music, although the number of different overlapping cycles can be quite large, and encode a wide variety of musical parameters, such as dynamics, articulation, timbre, register, and so forth.

== Opera cycles ==
An opera cycle is a set of individual thematically linked operas, sharing characters, settings, or plot elements, designed to be performed as a unified, larger work, typically spanning several nights.

- Richard Wagner's Ring Cycle consists of four individual operas.
- Giacomo Puccini's Il tabarro, Suor Angelica, and Gianni Schicchi form a set of three one-act operas, intended to be performed together and collectively titled Il trittico.
- Germaine Tailleferre's Du style galant au style méchant is made up of four chamber operas which parody a different operatic form or style
- Robert Ashley's Perfect Lives, Atalanta, and Now Eleanor's Idea form a trilogy.
- R. Murray Schafer's Patria is composed of twelve separate works, which he classifies as "music theater".
- Karlheinz Stockhausen's Licht consists of seven individual operas named after the days of the week.

== See also ==
- Aus den sieben Tagen
- Circle of fifths
- Cyclic form
- Für kommende Zeiten
- Klang
- Symphonic cycle
- Zyklus
