= Carrier (album) =

Studio album by The Dodos
- Released: August 27, 2013
- Genre: Indie rock
- Length: 41:03
- Label: Polyvinyl

The Dodos chronology
No Color (2011)	Carrier (2013)	Individ (2015)

Singles from Carrier
- 1. "Confidence" Released: May 21, 2013

Professional ratings
Aggregate scores
Source	Rating
Metacritic	77/100
Review scores
Source	Rating
Sputnikmusic	4.5/5 stars
Filter Magazine	89%
MusicOMH	4/5 stars
Consequence of Sound	4/5 stars
Pitchfork	6.8/10

Carrier is the fifth studio album by indie folk band The Dodos. It was released in August 2013 under Polyvinyl Record Co.

== Track listing ==
No.	Title	Length
1.	"Transformer"	4:48
2.	"Substance"	3:36
3.	"Confidence"	4:49
4.	"Stranger"	4:00
5.	"Relief"	3:39
6.	"Holidays"	1:27
7.	"Family"	3:26
8.	"The Current"	3:57
9.	"Destroyer"	3:28
10.	"Death"	3:19
11.	"The Ocean"	4:34
