= No Color =

Studio album by The Dodos
- Released: March 15, 2011
- Recorded: 2010
- Studio: Scenic Burrows, Portland: Tiny Telephone, San Francisco; Type Foundry, Portland
- Genre: Indie folk, alternative
- Length: 41:55
- Label: Frenchkiss
- Producer: John Askew

The Dodos chronology
Time To Die (2009)	No Color (2011)	Carrier (2013)

Professional ratings
Aggregate scores
Source	Rating
Metacritic	79/100
Review scores
Source	Rating
AllMusic	3.5/5 stars
The A.V. Club	(A−)
NME	(7/10)
Pitchfork Media	(7.6/10)
Slant Magazine	4/5 stars

No Color is the fourth album by indie folk band The Dodos.

== Track listing ==
No.	Title	Length
1.	"Black Night"	4:22
2.	"Going Under"	6:04
3.	"Good"	6:10
4.	"Sleep"	3:12
5.	"Don't Try and Hide It"	3:46
6.	"When Will You Go"	4:36
7.	"Hunting Season"	4:46
8.	"Companions"	4:45
9.	"Don't Stop"	4:22
10.	"All Night" (bonus track)	3:26

== Personnel ==
- Meric Long – vocals, guitar, piano
- Logan Kroeber – drums, percussion

Additional personnel

- Neko Case – backing vocals
- Keaton Snyder – vibraphone, percussion
- Minna Choi – strings arrangements
- Erin Wang, Ivo Bokulic, Philip Brezina, Steph Bibbo – strings performing
- Jay Pellicci – strings recording
