= Du style galant au style méchant =

Opera cycle by Germaine Tailleferre

Du style galant au style méchant is an opera cycle written for radio by composer Germaine Tailleferre and librettist Denise Centore. The cycle consisted of five short one act French language chamber operas, each one written to parody a different operatic form or style. The four surviving operas are La fille d'opéra (a parody of Jean-Philippe Rameau), Le bel ambitieux (a parody of Gioachino Rossini), La pauvre Eugénie (a parody of Gustave Charpentier), and Monsieur Petit Pois achète un château (a parody of Jacques Offenbach). The cycle had its world premiere on December 28, 1955 in a performance by the Radiodiffusion-Télévision Française.

In November 2014 portions of the cycle were staged by director Marie-Eve Signeyrole at the Opéra de Limoges in Originaux & Pastiches; a pastiche created using music from all four radio operas along with music from Rameau's Platée, Rossini's The Barber of Seville, Charpentier's Louise, and Offenbach's The Tales of Hoffmann. The cast included Magali Arnault-Stanczak, Kimy McLaren, Jean-Michel Richer, and Dominique Côté.
