= Time to Die (The Dodos album) =

Studio album by The Dodos
- Released: September 15, 2009
- Recorded: 2009
- Genre: Indie folk, alternative
- Length: 45:52
- Label: Frenchkiss
- Producer: Phil Ek

The Dodos chronology
Visiter (2008)	Time to Die (2009)	No Color (2011)

Professional ratings
Review scores
Source	Rating
AllMusic	3/5 stars
Drowned in Sound	6/10
NME	2.5/5 stars
Pitchfork Media	7.1/10

Time to Die is an album by indie folk trio The Dodos. It was produced by Phil Ek. The album leaked to the internet on July 8, 2009.

== Track listing ==
1. "Small Deaths" – 5:19
2. "Longform" – 4:39
3. "Fables" – 4:18
4. "The Strums" – 4:47
5. "This Is a Business" – 4:39
6. "Two Medicines" – 5:27
7. "Troll Nacht" – 6:23
8. "Acorn Factory" – 4:04
9. "Time to Die" – 6:16

Bonus Tracks: iTunes

1. "Company" – 5:05

== Personnel ==
- Meric Long – vocals, guitar
- Logan Kroeber – drums, percussion

Additional personnel

- Keaton Snyder – vibraphone
- Anna Hillburg – trumpet on 4
