= Bernstein–Mahler cycle =

The Bernstein–Mahler cycle usually refers to two separate audio recordings of the symphonies of composer Gustav Mahler, as performed by conductor Leonard Bernstein in the 1960s and 1980s respectively.

== First cycle ==
Bernstein's first Mahler cycle was the first (of now many) complete Mahler cycles with symphonies 1-9 recorded between 1960 and 1967 on the CBS (now Sony) label. Although they were not the first recordings of the individual symphonies, Bernstein's advocacy was an important part of the Mahler boom of the 1960s (especially in the US) and helped increase the popularity of the less commonly played symphonies like the third, sixth, and seventh. The cycle used performances by the New York Philharmonic—the same orchestra that Mahler led during a brief tenure between 1909 and his death in 1911—as well as a performance of the 8th symphony by the London Symphony Orchestra. Bernstein subsequently re-recorded Symphony No. 2 for CBS with the London Symphony Orchestra in 1973; sometimes this recording has been included in CD editions of the cycle. Bernstein refused to conduct the complete tenth, rendered posthumously from Mahler's sketches by the musicologist Deryck Cooke, although he did record the opening adagio with the New York Philharmonic in 1975.

== Second cycle ==
Bernstein's second Mahler cycle recorded for Deutsche Grammophon took advantage of the newly developed digital recording technologies of the 1980s. The new cycle also involved recordings by orchestras closely linked to Mahler's compositional and conductorial output, including the New York Philharmonic, the Vienna Philharmonic, and the Amsterdam Concertgebouw. Bernstein utilized his preferred latter-day technique of recording several live performances with patchup sessions to correct minor mistakes, believing it to be more satisfactory than a full studio recording. The 8th symphony was still to be recorded at the time of Bernstein's death, and a 1975 radio tape of a Salzburg Festival performance was used to complete the cycle. The performances of the fifth and first symphonies are often seen by critics as an improvement over the first cycle, as well as the recording of the fourth, despite sharp criticism of Bernstein's use of a boy soprano in the fourth movement. Although there are many similarities between the two cycles, Bernstein's later conducting style is often slower and makes more use of rubato than his approach in the 1960s.

=== Other recordings ===
In addition to the two audio cycles, Bernstein recorded a filmed cycle for Unitel in the 1970s with the Vienna Philharmonic and the London Symphony Orchestra (in Symphony 2 - in conjunction with the audio recording by CBS mentioned above). The film of the 8th symphony (recorded in Vienna) is a different performance to the Salzburg performance released in the second audio cycle.

Bernstein made two recordings of Das Lied von der Erde: in Vienna (1966) for Decca and in Israel (1972) for CBS. He also made various recordings of Mahler's song cycles including Kindertotenlieder and Lieder aus "Des Knaben Wunderhorn" (The Youth's Magic Horn).

Since Bernstein's death, several other Mahler recordings have emerged from broadcast sources and have been released commercially, including a Second Symphony with the Orchestre de Radio France from 1958, and a Ninth Symphony with the Berlin Philharmonic from 1979. As well also came out, on a CBS record, the finale of the Second Symphony with the Israel Philharmonic Orchestra, in a part of a record named "Hatikvah on Mt. Scopus", from 1967.
