= Hemiola =

Musical ratio of 3:2

In music, hemiola (also hemiolia) is the ratio 3:2. The equivalent Latin term is sesquialtera. In rhythm, hemiola refers to three beats of equal value in the time normally occupied by two beats. In pitch, hemiola refers to the interval of a perfect fifth.

== Etymology ==
The word hemiola comes from the Greek adjective ἡμιόλιος, hemiolios, meaning "containing one and a half," "half as much again," "in the ratio of one and a half to one (3:2), as in musical sounds." The words "hemiola" and "sesquialtera" both signify the ratio 3:2, and in music were first used to describe relations of pitch. Dividing the string of a monochord in this ratio produces the interval of a perfect fifth. Beginning in the 15th century, both words were also used to describe rhythmic relationships, specifically the substitution (usually through the use of coloration—red notes in place of black ones, or black in place of "white", hollow noteheads) of three imperfect notes (divided into two parts) for two perfect ones (divided into three parts) in tempus perfectum or in prolatio maior.

== Rhythm ==
In rhythm, hemiola refers to three beats of equal value in the time normally occupied by two beats.

=== Vertical hemiola: sesquialtera ===
The Oxford Dictionary of Music illustrates hemiola with a superimposition of three notes in the time of two and vice versa.

One textbook states that, although the word "hemiola" is commonly used for both simultaneous and successive durational values, describing a simultaneous combination of three against two is less accurate than for successive values and the "preferred term for a vertical two against three … is sesquialtera." The New Harvard Dictionary of Music states that in some contexts, a sesquialtera is equivalent to a hemiola. Grove's Dictionary, on the other hand, has maintained from the first edition of 1880 down to the most recent edition of 2001 that the Greek and Latin terms are equivalent and interchangeable, both in the realms of pitch and rhythm, although David Hiley, E. Thomas Stanford, and Paul R. Laird hold that, though similar in effect, hemiola properly applies to a momentary occurrence of three duple values in place of two triple ones, whereas sesquialtera represents a proportional metric change between successive sections.

In compound time (6/8 or 6/4), where a regular pattern of two beats to a measure is established at the start of a phrase, this changes to a pattern of three beats at the end of the phrase.

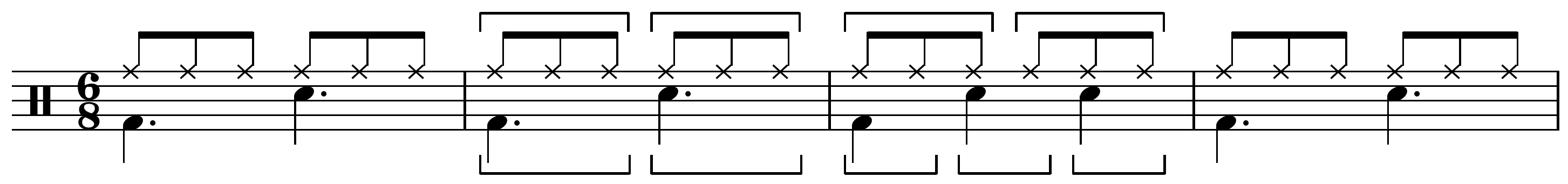
Archaic hemiola

==== Sub-Saharan African music ====
A repeating vertical hemiola is known as polyrhythm, or more specifically, cross-rhythm. The most basic rhythmic cell of sub-Saharan Africa is the 3:2 cross-rhythm. Novotney observes: "The 3:2 relationship (and [its] permutations) is the foundation of most typical polyrhythmic textures found in West African musics." Agawu states: "[The] resultant [3:2] rhythm holds the key to understanding ... there is no independence here, because 2 and 3 belong to a single Gestalt."

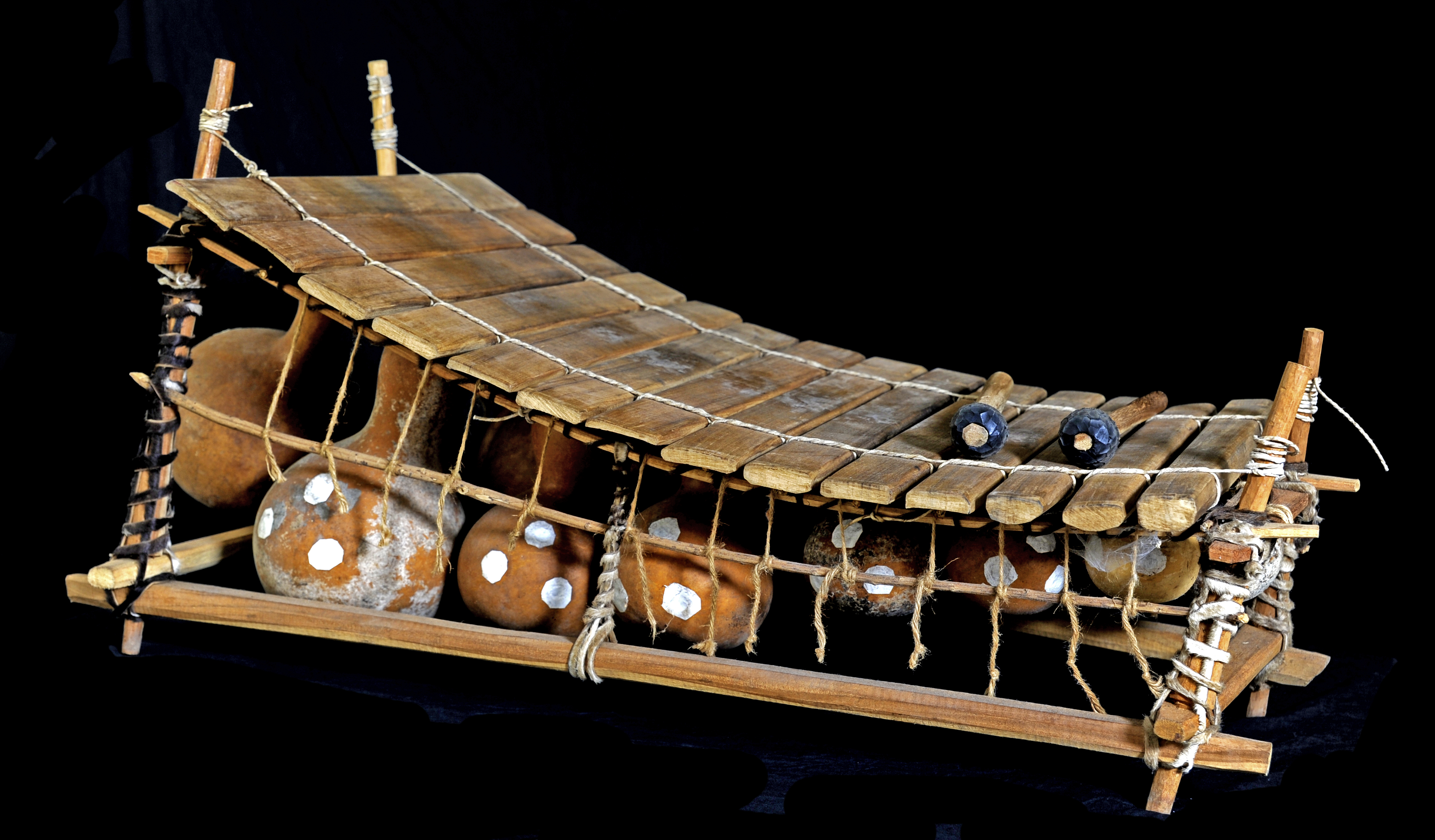
Ghanaian gyil

In the following example, a Ghanaian gyil plays a hemiola as the basis of an ostinato melody. The left hand (lower notes) sounds the two main beats, while the right hand (upper notes) sounds the three cross-beats.

==== European music ====
Hemiola is found in many Renaissance pieces in triple rhythm. One composer who exploited this characteristic was the 16th-century French composer Claude Le Jeune, a leading exponent of musique mesurée à l'antique. One of his best-known chansons is "Revoici venir du printemps", where the alternation of compound-duple and simple-triple metres with a common counting unit for the beat subdivisions can be clearly heard:

Claude LeJeune, Revoici venir du printemps

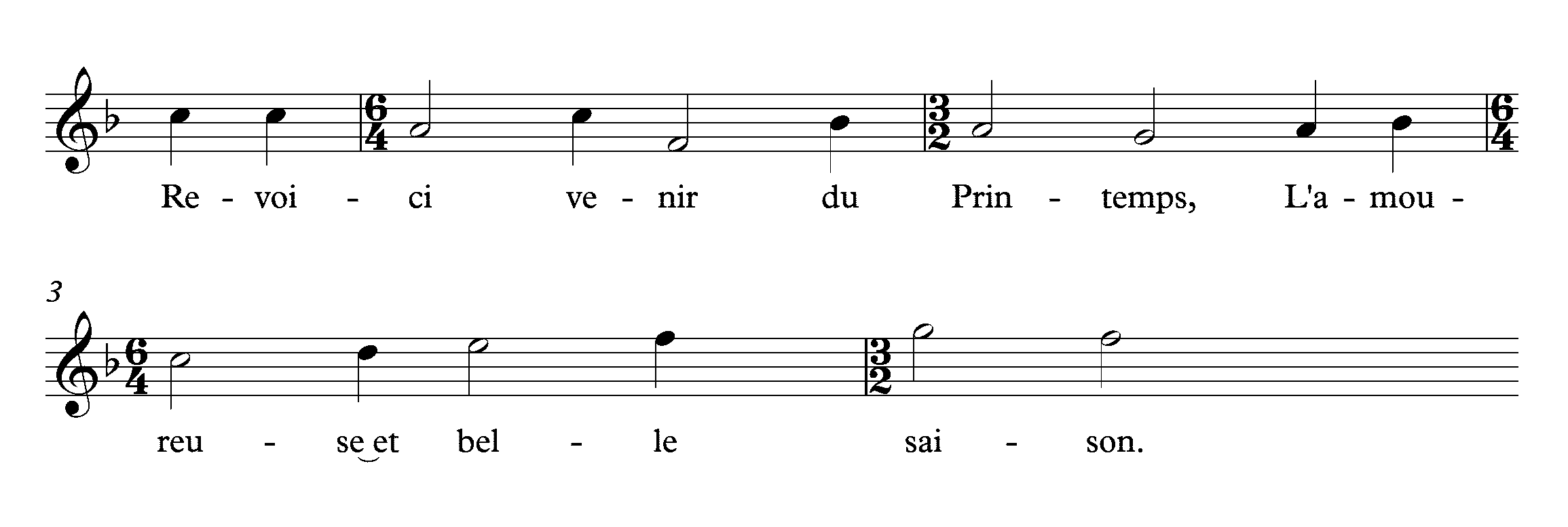
Claude LeJeune, "Revoici venir du printemps", bars 1–4 of the upper vocal line. Listen on YouTube

The song "Can she excuse my wrongs?" by the late 16th century lutenist and composer John Dowland is “a particularly complex – and therefore a particularly delightful – example” of the use of hemiolas. These can be found in the fifth bar of an anonymous arrangement for keyboard of Dowland's song found in the Fitzwilliam Virginal Book (Number 188):

Can she excuse - Dowland

Can she excuse - Dowland

The hemiola was commonly used in baroque music, particularly in dances, such as the courante and minuet. The minuet from J. S. Bach's keyboard Partita No. 5 in G major articulates groups of 2 times 3 quavers that are really in 6/8 time, despite the 3/4 metre stated in the initial time-signature. The latter time is restored only at the cadences (bars 4 and 11–12):

Bach: Minuet from Partita 5 in G bars 1–12

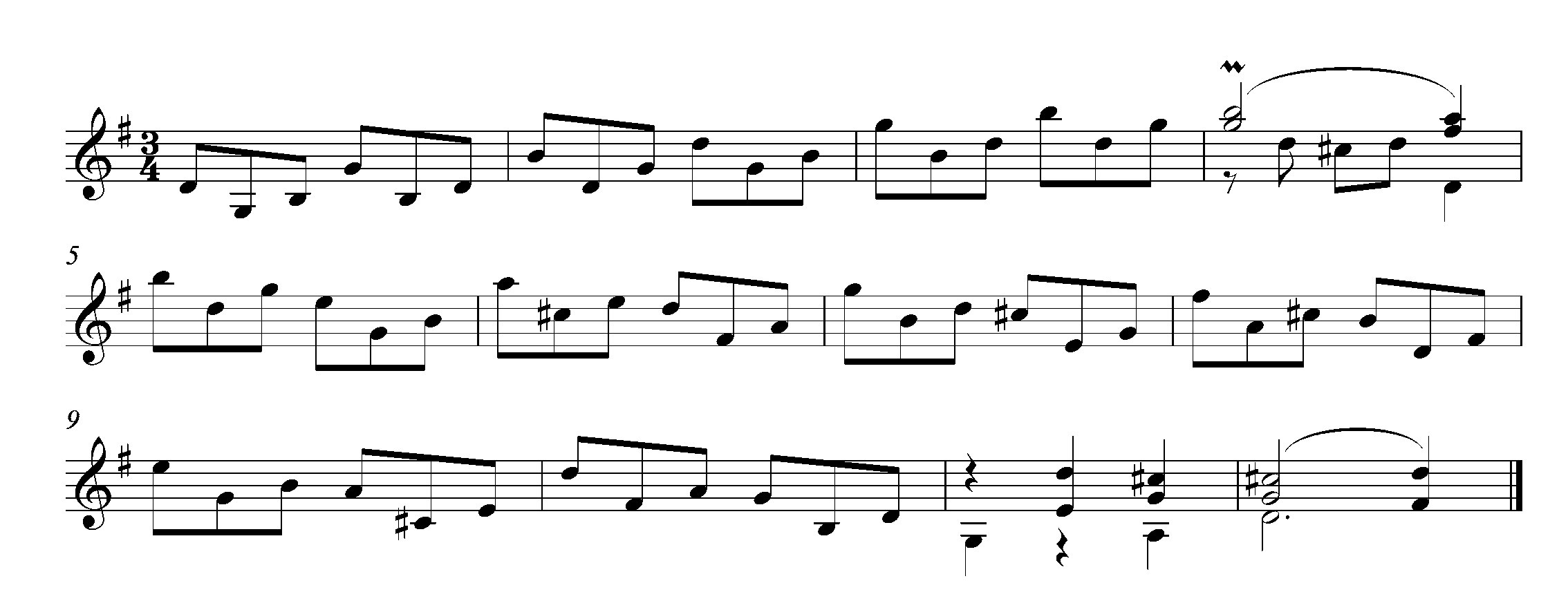
Bach: Minuet from Partita 5 in G bars 1–12

Later in the same piece, Bach creates a conflict between the two metres (6/8 against 3/4):

Bach Minuet from Partita 5 in G bars 37–52

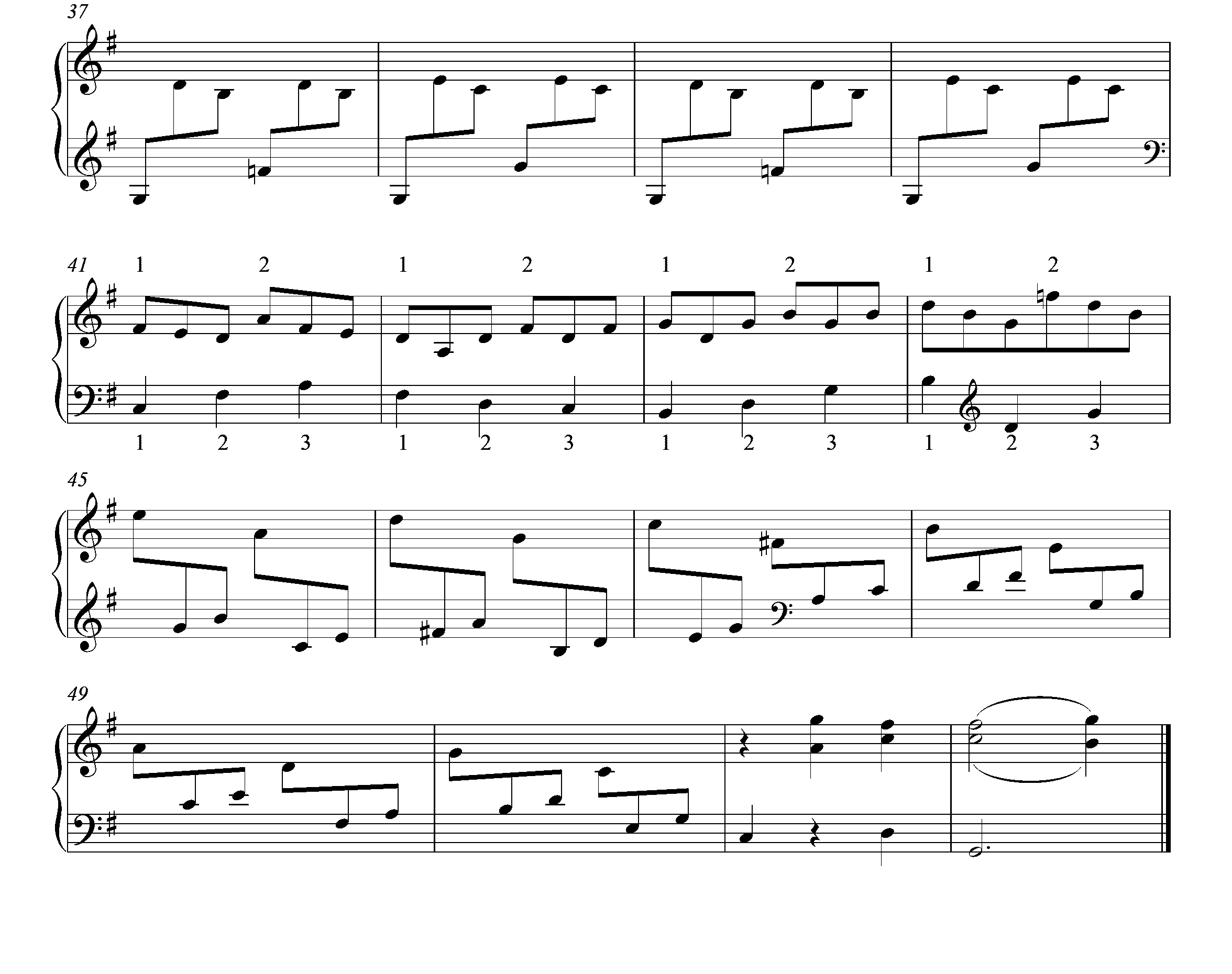
Bach: Minuet from Partita 5 in G, bars 37–52

Other composers who have used the device extensively include Corelli, Handel, Weber and Beethoven. A spectacular example from Beethoven comes in the scherzo from his String Quartet No. 6. As Philip Radcliffe puts it, "The constant cross-rhythms shifting between 3/4 and 6/8, more common at certain earlier and later periods, were far from usual in 1800, and here they are made to sound especially eccentric owing to frequent sforzandi on the last quaver of the bar... it looks ahead to later works and must have sounded very disconcerting to contemporary audiences."

Beethoven Scherzo from Op 18 No 6

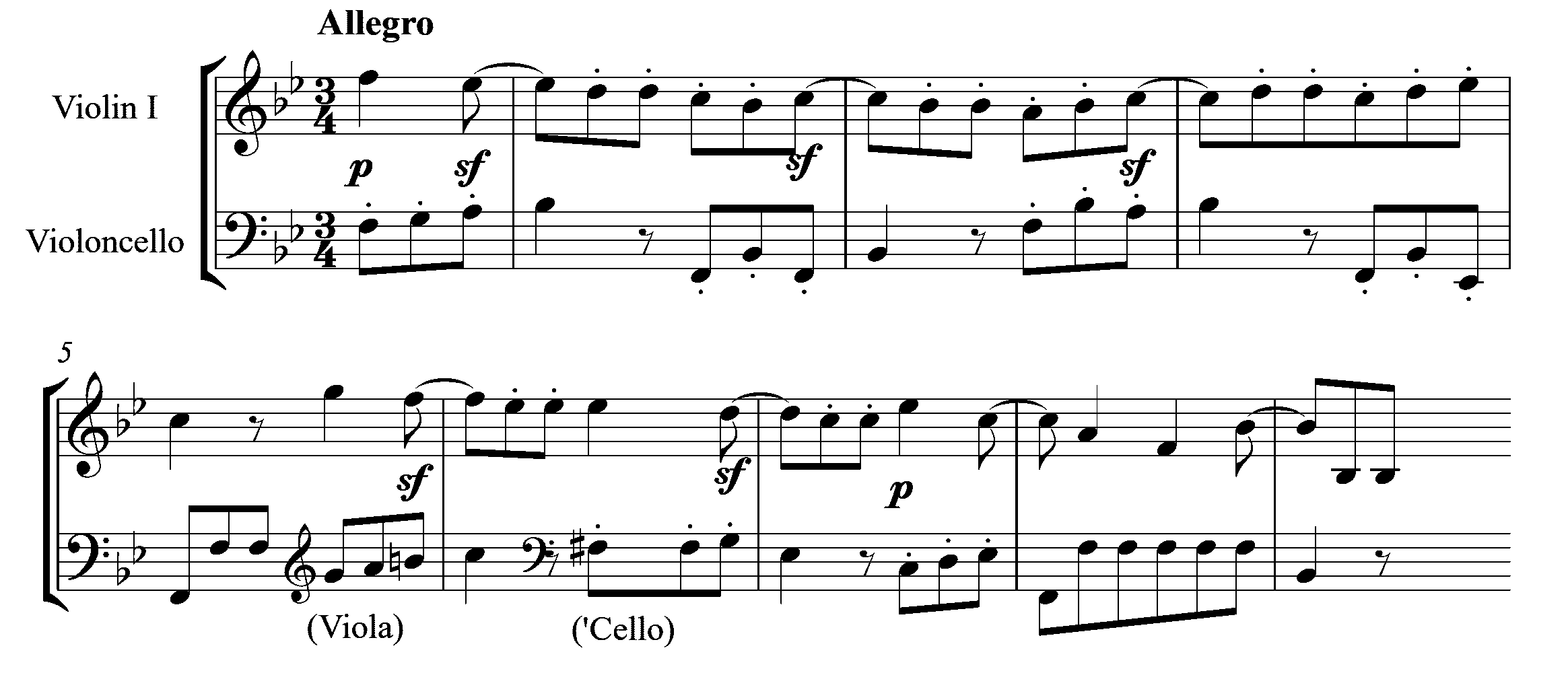
Beethoven Scherzo from Op. 18, No. 6, violin and cello only Listen on YouTube

Later in the nineteenth century, Tchaikovsky frequently used hemiolas in his waltzes, as did Richard Strauss in the waltzes from Der Rosenkavalier, and the third movement of Robert Schumann's Piano Concerto is noted for the ambiguity of its rhythm. John Daverio says that the movement's "fanciful hemiolas... serve to legitimize the dance-like material as a vehicle for symphonic elaboration."

Schumann Piano Concerto Finale bars 120–127

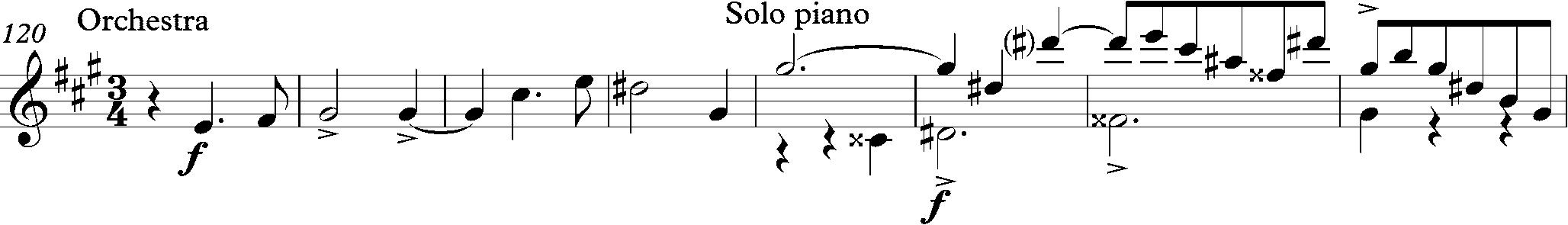
Schumann Piano Concerto Finale bars 120–127

Johannes Brahms was particularly famous for exploiting the hemiola's potential for large-scale thematic development. Writing about the rhythm and meter of Brahms's Symphony No. 3, Frisch says "Perhaps in no other first movement by Brahms does the development of these elements play so critical a role. The first movement of the third is cast in 6/4 meter that is also open, through internal recasting as 3/2 (a so-called hemiola). Metrical ambiguity arises in the very first appearance of the motto [opening theme]."

Brahms Symphony No. 3, opening bars

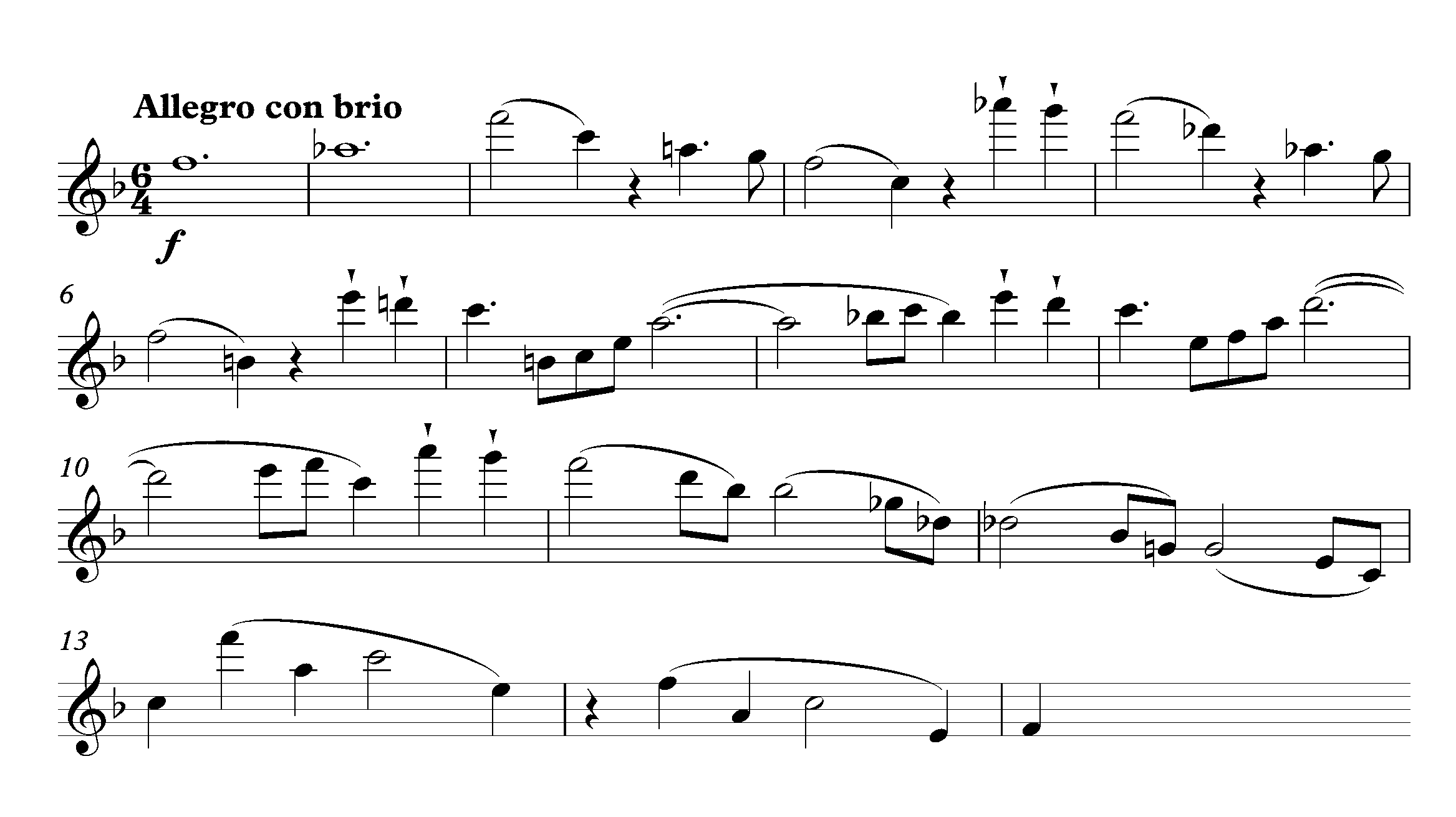
Brahms, Symphony No. 3, opening bars

At the beginning of the second movement, Assez vif – très rythmé, of his String Quartet (1903), Ravel "uses the pizzicato as a vehicle for rhythmic interplay between 6/8 and 3/4."

Ravel Quartet, second movement

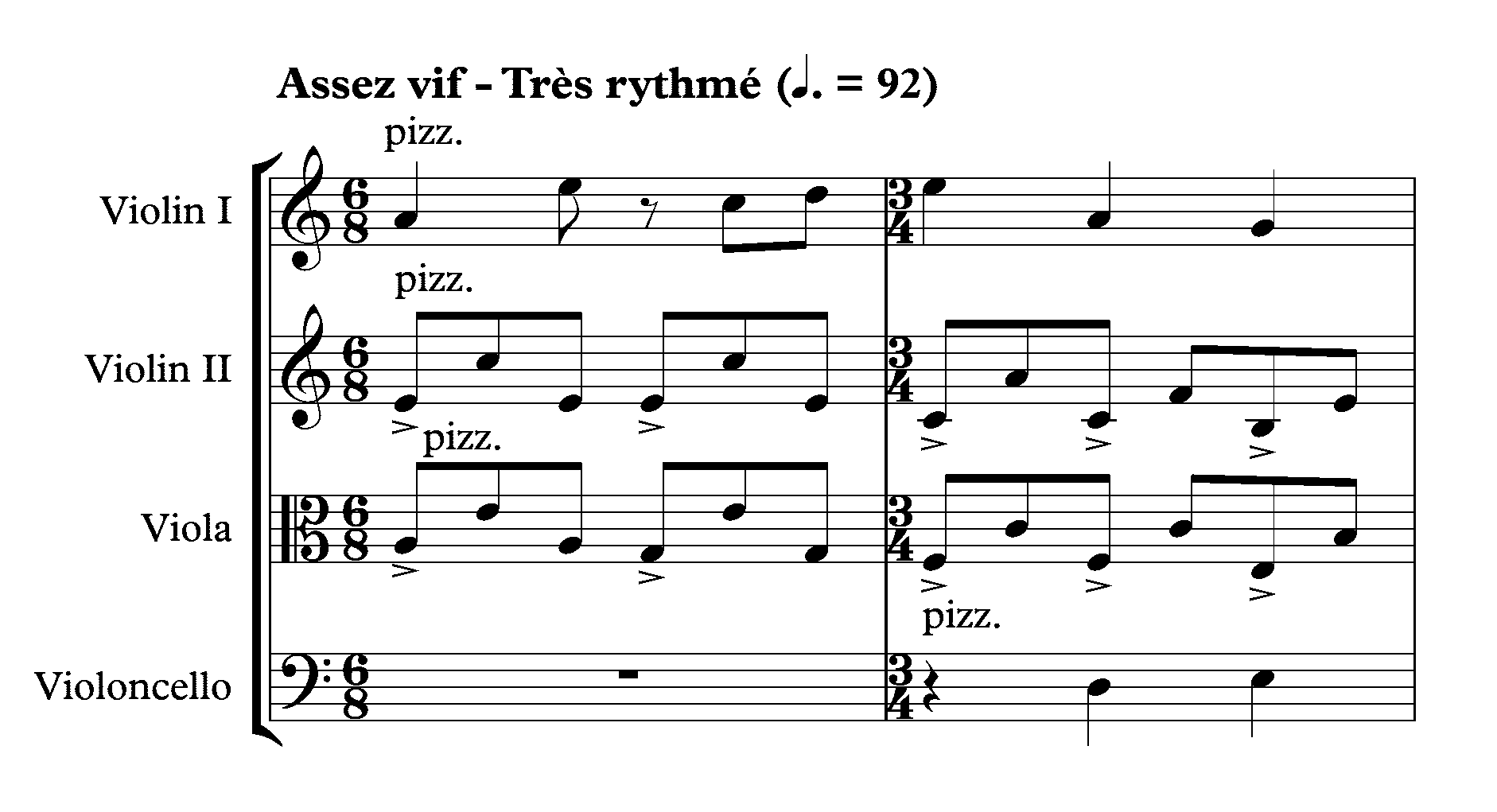
Second movement of Ravel Quartet

=== Horizontal hemiola ===
Peter Manuel, in the context of an analysis of the flamenco soleá song form, refers to the following figure as a horizontal hemiola or "sesquialtera" (which mistranslates as: "six that alters"). It is "a cliché of various Spanish and Latin American musics ... well established in Spain since the sixteenth century", a twelve-beat scheme with internal accents, consisting of a 6/8 bar followed by one in 3/4, for a 3 + 3 + 2 + 2 + 2 pattern.

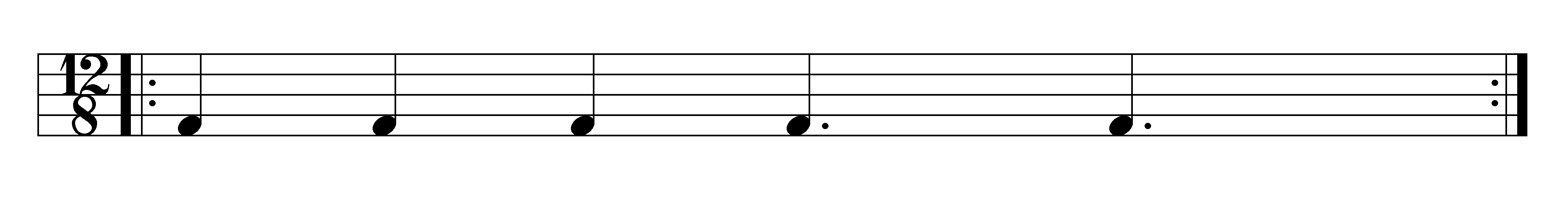
Horizontal hemiola

This figure is a common African bell pattern, used by the Hausa people of Nigeria, in Haitian Vodou drumming, Cuban palo, and many other drumming systems. The horizontal hemiola suggests metric modulation (6/8 changing to 3/4). This interpretational switch has been exploited, for example, by Leonard Bernstein, in the song "America" from West Side Story, as can be heard in the prominent motif (suggesting a duple beat scheme, followed by a triple beat scheme):

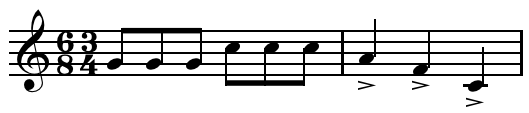
Horizontal hemiola in Bernstein's, "America" from West Side Story

== Pitch ==
=== The perfect fifth ===
Hemiola can be used to describe the ratio of the lengths of two strings as three-to-two (3:2), that together sound a perfect fifth. The early Pythagoreans, such as Hippasus and Philolaus, used this term in a music-theoretic context to mean a perfect fifth.

Just perfect fifth on C

The justly tuned pitch ratio of a perfect fifth means that the upper note makes three vibrations in the same amount of time that the lower note makes two. In the cent system of pitch measurement, the 3:2 ratio corresponds to approximately 702 cents, or 2% of a semitone wider than seven semitones. The just perfect fifth can be heard when a violin is tuned: if adjacent strings are adjusted to the exact ratio of 3:2, the result is a smooth and consonant sound, and the violin sounds in tune. Just perfect fifths are the basis of Pythagorean tuning, and are employed together with other just intervals in just intonation. The 3:2 just perfect fifth arises in the justly tuned C major scale between C and G.

=== Other intervals ===
Later Greek authors such as Aristoxenus and Ptolemy use the word to describe smaller intervals as well, such as the hemiolic chromatic pyknon, which is one-and-a-half times the size of the semitone comprising the enharmonic pyknon.

== See also ==
- Cross-beat
- Syncopation
