= Visiter =

Studio album by The Dodos
- Released: March 18, 2008
- Recorded: 2008
- Genre: Indie; alternative; folk
- Length: 59:00
- Label: Frenchkiss
- Producer: John Askew

The Dodos chronology
Beware of the Maniacs (2006)	Visiter (2008)	Time To Die (2009)

Professional ratings
Aggregate scores
Source	Rating
Metacritic	83/100
Review scores
Source	Rating
AllMusic	4/5 stars
Entertainment Weekly	B+
Drowned in Sound	8/10
The Guardian	4/5 stars
musicOMH	4/5 stars
NME	8/10
Pitchfork	8.5/10
Q	4/5 stars
Uncut	4/5 stars
Under the Radar	9/10

Visiter is the second album released by The Dodos. A special edition is being put together to include a DVD of live footage from the last show of their most recent tour.

In an April 2008 interview in the L.A. Record, band member Meric Long revealed the origin of the name of Visiter. "The reason it's misspelled is because it's from a drawing this kid gave us. We played a show for a bunch of kids in South Central L.A.—Dorsey High. A friend's sister [Barbara Lempel] is a special-ed teacher there, so we went down there to her class and we played for the kids and it was super fun. Then it came to the kids asking us questions and then one of the kids came up to us and he gave us a drawing with that written on it. The drawing is the cover actually of the album, and just—I dunno we liked it. Actually we used all of the drawings that the kids made in the artwork on the album. It was definitely a fun, interesting venture for us. We'd never played for kids before—we didn't know what to expect but they were clapping and dancing."

== Track listing ==
All tracks written by The Dodos.

No.	Title	Length
1.	"Walking"	2:09
2.	"Red and Purple"	4:40
3.	"Eyelids"	0:59
4.	"Fools"	4:43
5.	"Joe's Waltz"	7:22
6.	"Winter"	3:44
7.	"It's That Time Again"	1:29
8.	"Paint the Rust"	6:15
9.	"Park Song"	2:49
10.	"Jodi"	6:14
11.	"Ashley"	4:04
12.	"The Season"	6:15
13.	"Undeclared"	1:53
14.	"God?"	6:51

== Personnel ==
- Meric Long – vocals, guitar, banjo, keyboards
- Logan Kroeber – drums, percussion

== Guests ==
- Laura Gibson - vocals on 1,5,11
- Cory Gray - trumpet on 6,14 and horn on 7

== Credits ==
Recorded and mixed at Type Foundry Studios. All tracks mastered by Roger Seibel at SAE in Phoenix, AZ. Additional Vocals on various tracks by Laura Gibson
