= V. Kofi Agawu =

Ghanaian-born American musicologist and theorist (born 1956)

Professor Kofi Agawu
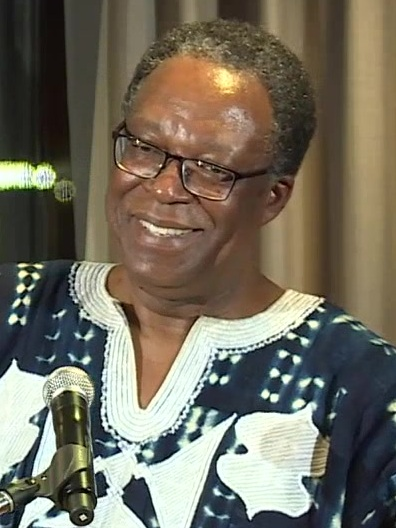
- Agawu in 2017
- Born: September 28, 1956 (age 70); Ghana
- Occupation: Professor of Music
- Title: Distinguished Professor
- Awards: Guggenheim Fellowship, the Dent Medal, the Frank Llewellyn Harrison Medal, the Howard T. Behrman Award from Princeton University, and honorary degrees from Stellenbosch University (2017) and Bard College (2019)

Academic work
- Discipline: Musicologist and music theorist
- Institutions: Graduate Center, CUNY
- Main interests: Music analysis, musical semiotics, African music, postcolonial theory
- Notable works: The African Imagination in Music (2016), Music as Discourse: Semiotic Adventures in Romantic Music (2009), Representing African Music: Postcolonial Notes, Queries, Positions (2003), African Rhythm: A Northern Ewe Perspective (1995), Playing with Signs: A Semiotic Interpretation of Classic Music (1991)

Victor Kofi Agawu (born 28 September 1956) is a Ghanaian musicologist and music theorist. He often publishes as V. Kofi Agawu and specializes in musical semiotics and ethnomusicology. He is a distinguished professor at the Graduate Center, CUNY.

== Education ==
Victor Kofi Agawu was born on 28 September 1956 in Hohoe, the Volta Region of Ghana. Agawu attended Presbyterian Boys' Secondary School at Legon (PRESEC) where he obtained his GCE Ordinary Level Certificate and went on to do this Advanced Level at Achimota School. He earned a bachelor's degree in music from the University of Reading in the United Kingdom in 1977, a master's degree in musical analysis from King's College London in 1978, and a Ph.D. in historical musicology from Stanford University in 1982. He is also certified by the Royal Academy of Music in the teaching of singing and by the Royal College of Music in musicianship and theory.

== Career ==
Agawu has taught at Princeton University, Yale University, Cornell University, King's College London, Duke University, Haverford College, and the University of Oxford. In 2006, he was appointed professor of music and African and African-American studies in Harvard University's Faculty of Arts and Sciences. He returned to Princeton several years later and then taught at the Graduate Center, CUNY as a visiting professor, returning there in January 2019 as a Professor of Music and rising to Distinguished Professor status in July 2019. His awards include the Dent Medal in 1992, awarded by the Royal Musical Association and International Musicological Society for "outstanding contribution to musicology." Agawu has written more than 75 peer-reviewed journal articles and given over 100 keynote addresses and invited lectures.

In 2009, he was awarded the IRC Harrison Medal of the Society for Musicology in Ireland.

== Publications ==
Agawu's first and most widely cited book is Playing with Signs: A Semiotic Interpretation of Classic Music (1991), which won the emerging scholar award from the Society for Music Theory. His next monograph was African Rhythm, A Northern Ewe Perspective (1995), which deals with the relationship and interference of the Ewe language and their music in everyday lives revealing a greater horizon for African rhythmic expression. More recent books include The African Imagination in Music (2016), Music as Discourse: Semiotic Adventures in Romantic Music (2009), and Representing African Music: Postcolonial Notes, Queries, Positions (2003).
