= Clave (rhythm) =

Rhythmic pattern in Cuban music

The clave (/ˈklɑːveɪ, kleɪv/; Spanish: [ˈklaβe]) is a rhythmic pattern used as a tool for temporal organization in Brazilian, Cuban music and Dominican music. In Spanish, clave literally means key, clef, code, or keystone. It is present in a variety of genres such as Abakuá music, rumba, conga, son, mambo, salsa, songo, timba, Afro-Cuban jazz, Palo music, Salve and Atabales and Congos. The five-stroke clave pattern represents the structural core of many Cuban rhythms. The study of rhythmic methodology, especially in the context of Afro-Cuban music, and how it influences the mood of a piece is known as clave theory.

The clave pattern originated in sub-Saharan African music traditions, where it serves essentially the same function as it does in Cuba. In ethnomusicology, clave is also known as a key pattern, guide pattern, phrasing referent, timeline, or asymmetrical timeline. The clave pattern is also found in the African diaspora music of Haitian Vodou drumming, Afro-Brazilian music, African-American music, Louisiana Voodoo drumming, and Afro-Uruguayan music (candombe). The clave pattern (or hambone, as it is known in the United States) is used in North American popular music as a rhythmic motif or simply a form of rhythmic decoration.

The historical roots of the clave are linked to transnational musical exchanges within the African diaspora. For instance, influences of the African “bomba” rhythm are reflected in the clave. In addition to this, the emphasis and role of the drum within the rhythmic patterns speaks further to these diasporic roots.

The clave is the foundation of reggae, reggaeton, and dancehall. In this sense, it is the “heartbeat” that underlies the essence of these genres. The rhythms and vibrations are universalized in that they demonstrate a shared cultural experience and knowledge of these roots. Ultimately, this embodies the diasporic transnational exchange.

In considering the clave as this basis of cultural understanding, relation, and exchange, this speaks to the transnational influence and interconnectedness of various communities. This musical fusion is essentially what constitutes the flow and foundational “heartbeat” of a variety of genres.

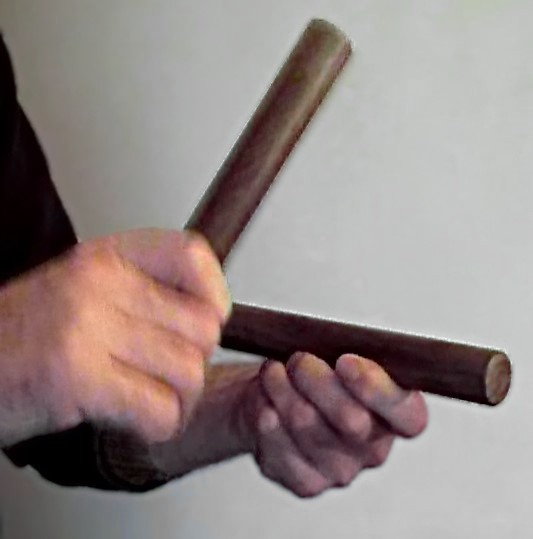
Playing a pair of claves

== Etymology ==
Clave is a Spanish word meaning 'code,' 'key,' as in key to a mystery or puzzle, or 'keystone,' the wedge-shaped stone in the center of an arch that ties the other stones together. The rhythm also gave the name to the claves Afro-Cuban musical instrument which consists of a pair of hardwood sticks.

== The key to Afro-Cuban rhythm ==
The son clave rhythm

Son clave and triple

Rumba clave and triple

Both patterns shown in simple meter (duple-pulse) and compound meter (triple-pulse) structures

The clave pattern holds the rhythm together in Afro-Cuban music. The two main clave patterns used in Afro-Cuban music are known in North America as son clave and the rumba clave. (Note: "There are just two claves—son clave and rumba clave.") Both are used as bell patterns across much of Africa. Son and rumba clave can be played in either a triple-pulse (12/8 or 6/8) or duple-pulse (4/4, 2/4 or 2/2) structure. (Note: "In reality, as Peñalosa explains in great detail in The Clave Matrix, there’s really only son and rumba clave, each of which can be played with a pure triple pulse structure feel, a pure duple pulse structure feel or somewhere in‐between. Needless to say, the terms son and rumba came much later.") The contemporary Cuban practice is to write the duple-pulse clave in a single measure of 4/4. It is also written in a single measure in ethnomusicological writings about African music.

Although they subdivide the beats differently, the 12/8 and 4/4 versions of each clave share the same pulse names. The correlation between the triple-pulse and duple-pulse forms of clave, as well as other patterns, is an important dynamic of sub-Saharan-based rhythm. Every triple-pulse pattern has its duple-pulse correlative.

Son clave has strokes on 1, 1a, 2&, 3&, 4.

4/4:

1 e & a 2 e & a 3 e & a 4 e & a ||
X . . X . . X . . . X . X . . . ||

12/8:

1 & a 2 & a 3 & a 4 & a ||
X . X . X . . X . X . . ||

Rumba clave has strokes on 1, 1a, 2a, 3&, 4.

4/4:

1 e & a 2 e & a 3 e & a 4 e & a ||
X . . X . . . X . . X . X . . . ||

12/8:

1 & a 2 & a 3 & a 4 & a ||
X . X . . X . X . X . . ||

Both clave patterns are used in rumba. What we now call son clave (also known as Havana clave) used to be the key pattern played in Havana-style yambú and guaguancó. Some Havana-based rumba groups still use son clave for yambú. (Note: Recorded examples of "son clave" used in yambú: “Ave Maria", Conjunto Folkloricó Nacional de Cuba, (1965: phonorecord). “Mama abuela”, Songs and Dances, Conjunto Clave y Guaguancó (1990: CD). “Maria Belen”, El callejon de los rumberos, Yoruba Andabo (1993: CD). “Chevere”, Déjala en la puntica, Conjunto Clave y Guaguancó (1996: CD). “Las lomas de Belén”, Buenavista en guaguagncó, Ecué Tumba (2001: CD).) The musical genre known as son probably adopted the clave pattern from rumba when it migrated from eastern Cuba to Havana at the beginning of the 20th century.

During the nineteenth century, African music and European music sensibilities were blended in original Cuban hybrids. Cuban popular music became the conduit through which sub-Saharan rhythmic elements were first codified within the context of European ('Western') music theory. The first written music rhythmically based on clave was the Cuban danzón, which premiered in 1879. The contemporary concept of clave with its accompanying terminology reached its full development in Cuban popular music during the 1940s. Its application has since spread to folkloric music as well. In a sense, the Cubans standardized their myriad rhythms, both folkloric and popular, by relating nearly all of them to the clave pattern. The veiled code of African rhythm was brought to light due to the clave’s omnipresence. Consequently, the term clave has come to mean both the five-stroke pattern and the total matrix it exemplifies. In other words, the rhythmic matrix is the clave matrix. Clave is the key that unlocks the enigma; it de-codes the rhythmic puzzle. It is commonly understood that the actual clave pattern does not need to be played for the music to be 'in clave'—Peñalosa (2009).

One of the most difficult applications of the clave is in the realm of composition and arrangement of Cuban and Cuban-based dance music. Regardless of the instrumentation, the music for all of the instruments of the ensemble must be written with a very keen and conscious rhythmic relationship to the clave . . . Any 'breaks' and/or 'stops' in the arrangements must also be 'in clave'. If these procedures are not properly taken into consideration, then the music is 'out of clave' which, if not done intentionally, is considered an error. When the rhythm and music are 'in clave', a great natural 'swing' is produced, regardless of the tempo. All musicians who write and/or interpret Cuban-based music must be 'clave conscious', not just the percussionists—Santos (1986).

== Clave theory ==
There are three main branches of what could be called clave theory.

=== Cuban popular music ===
First is the set of concepts and related terminology, which were created and developed in Cuban popular music from the mid-19th to the mid-20th centuries. In Popular Cuban Music, Emilio Grenet defines in general terms how the duple-pulse clave pattern guides all members of the music ensemble. An important Cuban contribution to this branch of music theory is the concept of the clave as a musical period, which has two rhythmically opposing halves. The first half is antecedent and moving, and the second half is consequent and grounded.

=== Ethnomusicological studies of African rhythm ===
The second branch comes from the ethnomusicological studies of sub-Saharan African rhythm. In 1959, Arthur Morris Jones published his landmark work Studies in African Music, in which he identified the triple-pulse clave as the guide pattern for many pieces of music from ethnic groups across Africa. An important contribution of ethnomusicology to clave theory is the understanding that the clave matrix is generated by cross-rhythm.

=== The 3–2/2–3 clave concept and terminology ===
The third branch comes from the United States. An important North American contribution to clave theory is the worldwide propagation of the 3–2/2–3 concept and terminology, which arose from the fusion of Cuban rhythms with jazz in New York City.

Only in the last couple of decades have the three branches of clave theory begun to reconcile their shared and conflicting concepts. Thanks to the popularity of Cuban-based music and the vast amount of educational material available on the subject, many musicians today have a basic understanding of clave. Contemporary books that deal with clave, share a certain fundamental understanding of what clave means.

Chris Washburne considers the term to refer to the rules that govern the rhythms played with the claves. Bertram Lehman regards the clave as a concept with wide-ranging theoretical syntactic implications for African music in general, and for David Peñalosa, the clave matrix is a comprehensive system for organizing music—Toussaint (2013).

=== Mathematical analysis ===
In addition to these three branches of theory, clave has in recent years been thoroughly analyzed mathematically. The structure of clave can be understood in terms of cross-rhythmic ratios, above all, three-against-two (3:2). Godfried Toussaint, a Research Professor of Computer Science, has published a book and several papers on the mathematical analysis of clave and related African bell patterns. Toussaint uses geometry and the Euclidean algorithm as a means of exploring the significance of clave.

== Types ==
=== Son clave ===
The most common clave pattern used in Cuban popular music is called the son clave, named after the Cuban musical genre of the same name. Clave is the basic period, composed of two rhythmically opposed cells, one antecedent and the other consequent. (Note: "The time of the bell rhythm and its division into beats establish meter, a concept that implies a musical period.") (Note: "We find that all its melodic design is constructed on a rhythmic pattern of two measures, as though both were only one, the first is antecedent, strong, and the second is consequent, weak.") Clave was initially written in two measures of 2/4 in Cuban music. When written this way, each cell or clave half is represented within a single measure.

==== Three-side / two-side ====
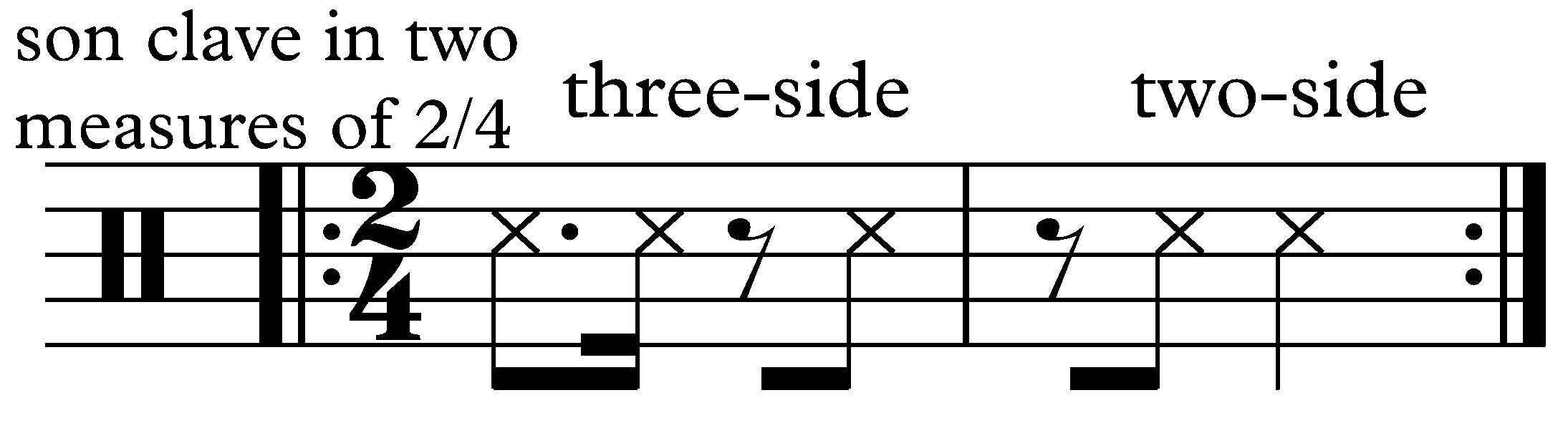

The antecedent half has three strokes and is called the three-side of the clave. The consequent half (second measure above) of clave has two strokes and is called the two-side. (Note: [The] clave pattern has two opposing rhythm cells: the first cell consists of three strokes, or the rhythm cell, which is called tresillo (Spanish tres = three). This rhythmically syncopated part of the clave is called the three-side or the strong part of the clave. The second cell has two strokes and is called the two-side of the weak part of the clave. . . The different accent types in the melodic line typically encounter with the clave strokes, which have some special name. Some of the clave strokes are accented both in more traditional tambores batá -music and in more modern salsa styles. Because of the popularity of these strokes, some special terms have been used to identify them. The second stroke of the strong part of the clave is called bombo. It is the most often accented clave stroke in my research material. Accenting it identifies the three-side of the clave. The second common clave stroke accented among these improvisations is the third stroke of the strong part of the clave. This stroke is called ponche. In Cuban popular genres, this stroke is often accented in unison breaks that transition between the song sections. The third typical way to accent the clave strokes is to play a rhythm cell, which includes both bombo and ponche accents. This rhythm cell is called [the] conga pattern)

Going only slightly into the rhythmic structure of our music we find that all its melodic design is constructed on a rhythmic pattern of two measures, as though both were only one, the first is antecedent, strong, and the second is consequent, weak—Grenet (1939).

[With] clave... the two measures are not at odds, but rather, they are balanced opposites like positive and negative, expansive and contractive or the poles of a magnet. As the pattern is repeated, an alternation from one polarity to the other takes place creating the pulse and rhythmic drive. Were the pattern to be suddenly reversed, the rhythm would be destroyed as in a reversing of one magnet within a series... the patterns are held in place according to both the internal relationships between the drums and their relationship with clave... Should the drums fall out of clave (and in contemporary practice they sometimes do) the internal momentum of the rhythm will be dissipated and perhaps even broken—Amira and Cornelius (1992).

==== Tresillo ====
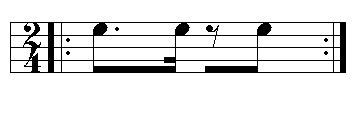
Tresillo

In Cuban popular music, the first three strokes of son clave are also known collectively as tresillo, a Spanish word meaning triplet i.e. three almost equal beats in the same time as two main beats. However, in the vernacular of Cuban popular music, the term refers to the figure shown here.

=== Rumba clave ===
Rumba clave in duple-pulse and triple-pulse structures and triple

The other main clave pattern is the rumba clave. Rumba clave is the key pattern used in Cuban rumba. The use of the triple-pulse form of the rumba clave in Cuba can be traced back to the iron bell (ekón) part in abakuá music. The form of rumba known as columbia is culturally and musically connected with abakuá which is an Afro Cuban cabildo that descends from the Kalabari of Cameroon. Columbia also uses this pattern. Sometimes 12/8 rumba clave is clapped in the accompaniment of Cuban batá drums. The 4/4 form of rumba clave is used in yambú, guaguancó and popular music.

There is some debate as to how the 4/4 rumba clave should be notated for guaguancó and yambú. In actual practice, the third stroke on the three-side and the first stroke on the two-side often fall in rhythmic positions that do not fit neatly into music notation. Triple-pulse strokes can be substituted for duple-pulse strokes. Also, the clave strokes are sometimes displaced in such a way that they don't fall within either a triple-pulse or duple-pulse "grid". Therefore, many variations are possible.

The first regular use of the rumba clave in Cuban popular music began with the mozambique, created by Pello el Afrikan in the early 1960s. When used in popular music (such as songo, timba or Latin jazz) rumba clave can be perceived in either a 3–2 or 2–3 sequence.

=== Standard bell pattern ===
4/4 standard pattern and 12/8 standard pattern) and triple-pulse (12/8) form

The seven-stroke standard bell pattern contains the strokes of both clave patterns. Some North American musicians call this pattern clave. Other North American musicians refer to the triple-pulse form as the 6/8 bell because they write the pattern in two measures of 6/8.

Like clave, the standard pattern is expressed in both triple and duple-pulse. The standard pattern has strokes on: 1, 1a, 2& 2a, 3&, 4, 4a.

12/8:

1 & a 2 & a 3 & a 4 & a ||
X . X . X X . X . X . X ||

4/4:

1 e & a 2 e & a 3 e & a 4 e & a ||
X . . X . . X X . . X . X . . X ||

The ethnomusicologist A.M. Jones observes that what we call son clave, rumba clave, and the standard pattern are the most commonly used key patterns (also called bell patterns, timeline patterns and guide patterns) in Sub-Saharan African music traditions and he considers all three to be basically the same pattern. Clearly, they are all expressions of the same rhythmic principles. The three key patterns are found within a large geographic belt extending from Mali in northwest Africa to Mozambique in southeast Africa.

== "6/8 clave" as used by North American musicians ==
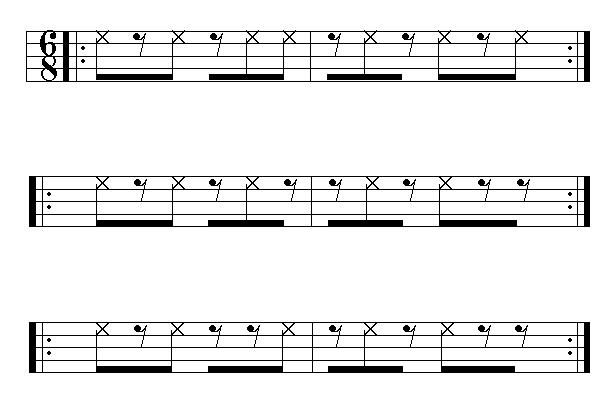
6/8 standard pattern; 6/8 son clave; 6/8 rumba clave

In Afro-Cuban folkloric genres the triple-pulse (12/8 or 6/8) rumba clave is the archetypal form of the guide pattern. Even when the drums are playing in duple-pulse (4/4), as in guaguancó, the clave is often played with displaced strokes that are closer to triple-pulse than duple-pulse. John Santos states: "The proper feel of this [rumba clave] rhythm, is closer to triple [pulse].”

Conversely, in salsa and Latin jazz, especially as played in North America, 4/4 is the basic framework and 6/8 is considered something of a novelty and in some cases, an enigma. The cross-rhythmic structure (multiple beat schemes) is frequently misunderstood to be metrically ambiguous. North American musicians often refer to Afro-Cuban 6/8 rhythm as a feel, a term usually reserved for those aspects of musical nuance not practically suited for analysis. As used by North American musicians, "6/8 clave" can refer to one of three types of triple-pulse key patterns.

=== Triple-pulse standard pattern ===
When one hears triple-pulse rhythms in Latin jazz the percussion is most often replicating the Afro-Cuban rhythm bembé. The standard bell is the key pattern used in bembé and so with compositions based on triple-pulse rhythms, it is the seven-stroke bell, rather than the five-stroke clave that is the most familiar to jazz musicians. Consequently, some North American musicians refer to the triple-pulse standard pattern as "6/8 clave".

=== Triple-pulse rumba clave ===
Some refer to the triple-pulse form of rumba clave as "6/8 clave". When rumba clave is written in 6/8 the four underlying main beats are counted: 1, 2, 1, 2.

1 & a 2 & a |1 & a 2 & a ||
X . X . . X |. X . X . . ||

Claves... are not usually played in Afro-Cuban 6/8 feels... [and] the clave [pattern] is not traditionally played in 6/8 though it may be helpful to do so to relate the clave to the 6/8 bell pattern—Thress (1994).

The main exceptions are: the form of rumba known as Columbia, and some performances of abakuá by rumba groups, where the 6/8 rumba clave pattern is played on claves.

=== Triple-pulse son clave ===
Triple-pulse son clave is the least common form of clave used in Cuban music. It is, however, found across an enormously vast area of sub-Saharan Africa. The first published example (1920) of this pattern identified it as a hand-clap part accompanying a song from Mozambique.

== Cross-rhythm and the correct metric structure ==
Because 6/8 clave-based music is generated from cross-rhythm, it is possible to count or feel the 6/8 clave in several different ways. The ethnomusicologist Arthur Morris Jones correctly identified the importance of this key pattern, but he mistook its accents as indicators of meter rather than the counter-metric phenomena they are. Similarly, while Anthony King identified the triple-pulse "son clave" as the ‘standard pattern’ in its simplest and most basic form, he did not correctly identify its metric structure. King represented the pattern in a polymetric 7+5/8 time signature.

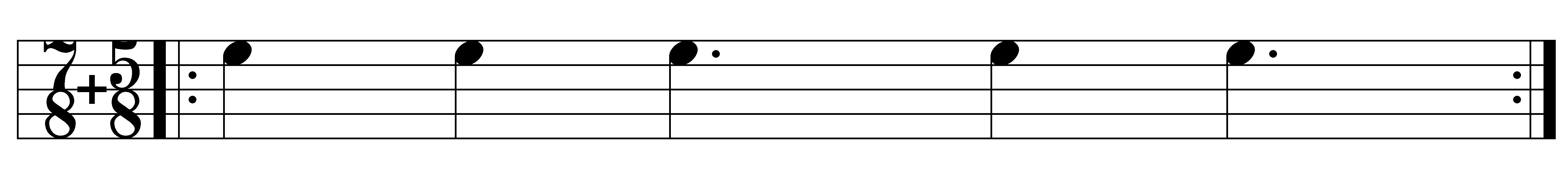
Anthony King's polymetric representation of triple-pulse "son clave"

It wasn't until African musicologists like C.K. Ladzekpo entered into the discussion in the 1970s and 80s that the metric structure of sub-Saharan rhythm was unambiguously defined. The writings of Victor Kofi Agawu and David Locke must also be mentioned in this regard.

In the diagram below 6/8 (son) clave is shown on top and a beat cycle is shown below it. Any or all of these structures may be the emphasis at a given point in a piece of music using the "6/8 clave".

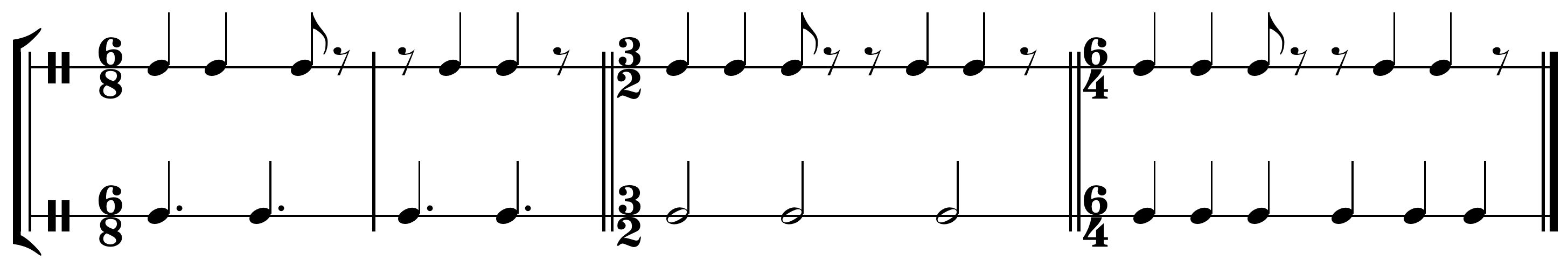
Different ways to count the 6/8 clave, the first of which is correct

The example on the left (6/8) represents the correct count and ground of the "6/8 clave". The four dotted quarter-notes across the two bottom measures are the main beats. All clave patterns are built upon four main beats. The bottom measures on the other two examples (3/2 and 6/4) show cross-beats. Observing the dancer's steps almost always reveals the main beats of the music. Because the main beats are usually emphasized in the steps and not the music, it is often difficult for an "outsider" to feel the proper metric structure without seeing the dance component. Kubik states: "To understand the emotional structure of any music in Africa, one has to look at the dancers as well and see how they relate to the instrumental background" (2010: 78).

For cultural insiders, identifying the... ‘dance feet’ occurs instinctively and spontaneously. Those not familiar with the choreographic supplement, however, sometimes have trouble locating the main beats and expressing them in movement. Hearing African music on recordings alone without prior grounding in its dance-based rhythms may not convey the choreographic supplement. Not surprisingly, many misinterpretations of African rhythm and meter stem from a failure to observe the dance.

— Agawu, (2003)

== 3–2/2–3 clave concept and terminology ==
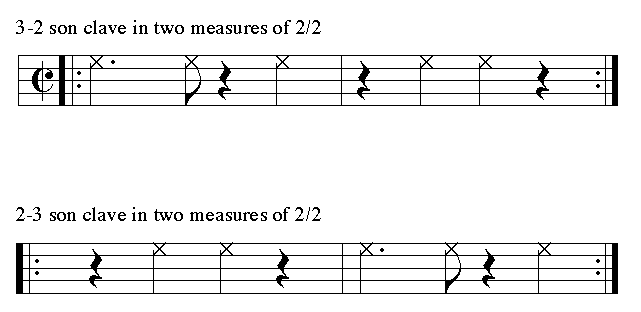
3–2 clave and 2–3 clave written in cut-time

In Cuban popular music, a chord progression can begin on either side of the clave. When the progression begins on the three-side, the song or song section is said to be in 3–2 clave. When the chord progression begins on the two-side, it is in 2–3 claves. In North America, salsa and Latin jazz charts commonly represent clave in two measures of cut-time (2/2); this is most likely the influence of jazz conventions. When clave is written in two measures (right), changing from one clave sequence to the other is a matter of reversing the order of the measures.

=== Chord progression begins on the three-side (3–2) ===
A guajeo is a typical Cuban ostinato melody, most often consisting of arpeggiated chords in syncopated patterns. Guajeos are a seamless blend of European harmonic and African rhythmic structures. Most guajeos have a binary structure that expresses clave.

==== Clave motif ====
Kevin Moore states: "There are two common ways that the three-side is expressed in Cuban popular music. The first to come into regular use, which David Peñalosa calls 'clave motif,' is based on the decorated version of the three-side of the clave rhythm." The following guajeo example is based on a clave motif. The three-side (first measure) consists of the tresillo variant known as cinquillo.

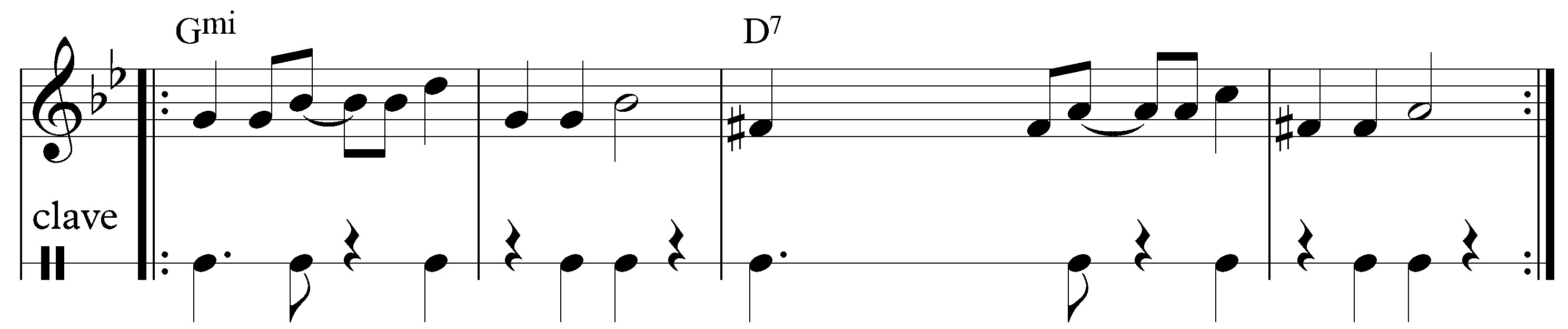
3–2 piano guajeo: clave motif, written in cut-time

Since this chord progression begins on the three-side, the song or song section is said to be in 3–2 clave.

==== Offbeat/onbeat motif ====
Moore: "By the 1940s [there was] a trend toward the use of what Peñalosa calls the 'offbeat/onbeat motif.' Today, the offbeat/onbeat motif method is much more common." With this type of guajeo motif, the three-side of clave is expressed with all offbeats. The following I–IV–V–IV progression is in a 3–2 clave sequence. It begins with an offbeat pick-up on the pulse immediately before beat 1. With some guajeos, offbeats at the end of the two-side, or beats at the end of the three-side serve as pick-ups leading into the next measure (when clave is written in two measures).

3–2 guajeo: offbeat/onbeat motif, written in cut-time

=== Chord progression begins on the two-side (2–3) ===
==== Clave motif ====
A chord progression can begin on either side of the clave. One can, therefore, be on either the three-side or the two-side because the harmonic progression, rather than the rhythmic progression, is the primary referent. The following guajeo is based on the clave motif in a 2–3 sequence. The cinquillo rhythm is now in the second measure.

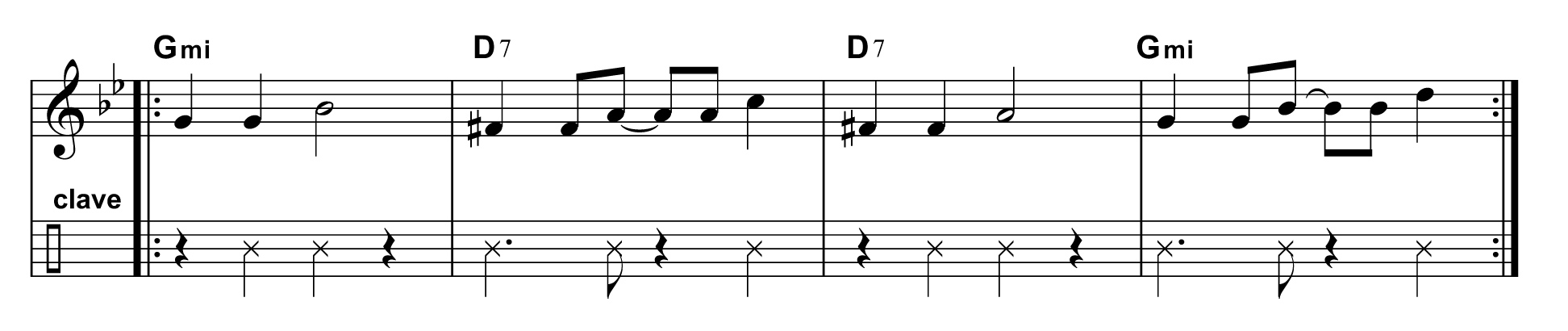
2–3 piano guajeo: clave motif, written in cut-time

==== Onbeat/offbeat motif ====
This guajeo is in 2–3 clave because it begins on the downbeat, emphasizing the onbeat quality of the two-side. The figure has the same harmonic sequence as the earlier offbeat/onbeat example, but rhythmically, the attack-point sequence of the two measures is reversed. Most salsa is in 2–3 clave and most salsa piano guajeos are based on the 2–3 onbeat/offbeat motif.

2–3 guajeo: onbeat/offbeat motif, written in cut-time

=== Going from one side of clave to the other within the same song ===
The 3–2/2–3 concept and terminology was developed in New York City during the 1940s by Cuban-born Mario Bauza while he was the music director of Machito and his Afro-Cubans. Bauzá was a master at moving the song from one side of the clave to the other.

The following melodic excerpt is taken from the opening verses of "Que vengan los rumberos" by Machito and his Afro-Cubans. Notice that the melody goes from one side of clave to the other and then back again. A measure of 2/4 moves the chord progression from the two-side (2–3) to the three-side (3–2). Later, another measure of 2/4 moves the start of the chord progression back to two-side (2–3).

According to David Peñalosa:

The first 4 1/2 claves of the verses are in 2–3. Following the measure of 2/4 (half clave) the song flips to the three-side. It continues in 3–2 on the V^{7} chord for 4 1/2 claves. The second measure of 2/4 flips the song back to the two-side and the I chord.

In songs like "Que vengan los rumberos", the phrases continually alternate between a 3–2 framework and a 2–3 framework. It takes a certain amount of flexibility to repeatedly reorder your orientation in this way. The most challenging moments are the truncations and other transitional phrases where you "pivot" to move your point of reference from one side of clave to the other.

Working in conjunction with the chord and clave changes, vocalist Frank "Machito" Grillo creates an arc of tension/release spanning more than a dozen measures. Initially, Machito sings the melody straight (first line), but soon expresses the lyrics in the freer and more syncopated inspiración of a folkloric rumba (second line). By the time the song changes to 3–2 on the V^{7} chord, Machito has developed a considerable amount of rhythmic tension by contradicting the underlying meter. That tension is then resolved when he sings on three consecutive main beats (quarter-notes), followed by tresillo. In the measure immediately following tresillo the song returns to 2–3 and the I chord (fifth line).

Tito Puente learned the concept from Bauzá. Tito Puente's "Philadelphia Mambo" is an example of a song that moves from one side of clave to the other. The technique eventually became a staple of composing and arranging in salsa and Latin jazz. According to Kevin Moore:

Clave direction is relative while clave alignment is absolute. If you walk from New York to Miami, you're walking south; if you walk from Miami to New York, you're walking north. But if you put your left shoe on your right foot, (i.e., if your shoes are cruzado), it's going to be a very awkward walk in either direction. Your shoes remain "aligned" (or misaligned) with your feet regardless of the direction your feet are taking you, and regardless of how poorly they fit.

Cuban folkloric musicians do not use the 3–2/2–3 system. Many Cuban performers of popular music do not use it either. The great Cuban conga player and bandleader Mongo Santamaría said, "Don’t tell me about 3–2 or 2–3! In Cuba, we just play. We feel it, we don’t talk about such things." In another book, Santamaría said, "In Cuba, we don’t think about [clave]. We know that we’re in a clave. Because we know that we have to be in clave to be a musician." According to Cuban pianist Sonny Bravo, Charlie Palmieri would insist that "There’s no such thing as 3–2 or 2–3, there’s only one clave!" The contemporary Cuban bassist, composer and arranger Alain Pérez flatly states: "In Cuba, we do not use that 2–3, 3–2 formula... 2–3, 3–2 [is] not used in Cuba. That is how people learn Cuban music outside Cuba."

== In non-Cuban music ==
=== Controversy over use and origins ===
The musical usage and historical origins of the clave are debated. This section presents examples from non-Cuban music, which some musicians hold to be representative of the clave. The most common claims, those of Brazilian and subsets of American popular music, are described below.

=== In Africa ===
==== A widely used bell pattern ====
Clave is a Spanish word and its musical usage as a pattern played on claves was developed in the western part of Cuba, particularly the cities of Matanzas and Havana. Some writings have claimed that the clave patterns originated in Cuba. One frequently repeated theory is that the triple-pulse African bell patterns morphed into duple-pulse forms as a result of the influence of European musical sensibilities. "The duple meter feel [of 4/4 rumba clave] may have been the result of the influence of marching bands and other Spanish styles..."— Washburne (1995).

However, the duple-pulse forms have existed in sub-Saharan Africa for centuries. The patterns the Cubans call clave are two of the most common bell parts used in Sub-Saharan African music traditions. Natalie Curtis, A.M. Jones, Anthony King and John Collins document the triple-pulse forms of what we call “son clave” and “rumba clave” in West, Central, and East Africa. Francis Kofi and C.K. Ladzekpo document several Ghanaian rhythms that use the triple or duple-pulse forms of "son clave". Percussion scholar royal hartigan identifies the duple-pulse form of "rumba clave" as a timeline pattern used by the Yoruba and Ibo of Nigeria, West Africa. He states that this pattern is also found in the high-pitched boat-shaped iron bell known as atoke played in the Akpese music of the Eve people of Ghana. There are many recordings of traditional African music where one can hear the five-stroke "clave" used as a bell pattern. (Note: Recorded examples of “son clave” in traditional music from Ghana and Benin: "Waka" (one) Addy, Mustapha Tettey, The Royal Drums of Ghana (1991: CD). "Kpanlogo" and "Fumefume" Traditional Dance Rhythms of Ghana v.1, Kofi, Francis (1997: pp. 30, 42/CD). "Nago/Yoruba", Benin, Rhythms, and Songs for the Vodun (1990: CD).)

==== Popular dance music ====
Cuban music has been popular in sub-Saharan Africa since the mid-twentieth century. To the Africans, clave-based Cuban popular music sounded both familiar and exotic. Congolese bands started doing Cuban covers and singing the lyrics phonetically. Soon, they were creating their original Cuban-like compositions, with lyrics sung in French or Lingala, a lingua franca of the western Congo region. The Congolese called this new music rumba, although it was based on the son. The Africans adapted guajeos to electric guitars and gave them their regional flavor. The guitar-based music gradually spread out from the Congo, increasingly taking on local sensibilities. This process eventually resulted in the establishment of several different distinct regional genres, such as soukous.

===== Soukous =====
The following soukous bass line is an embellishment of clave.

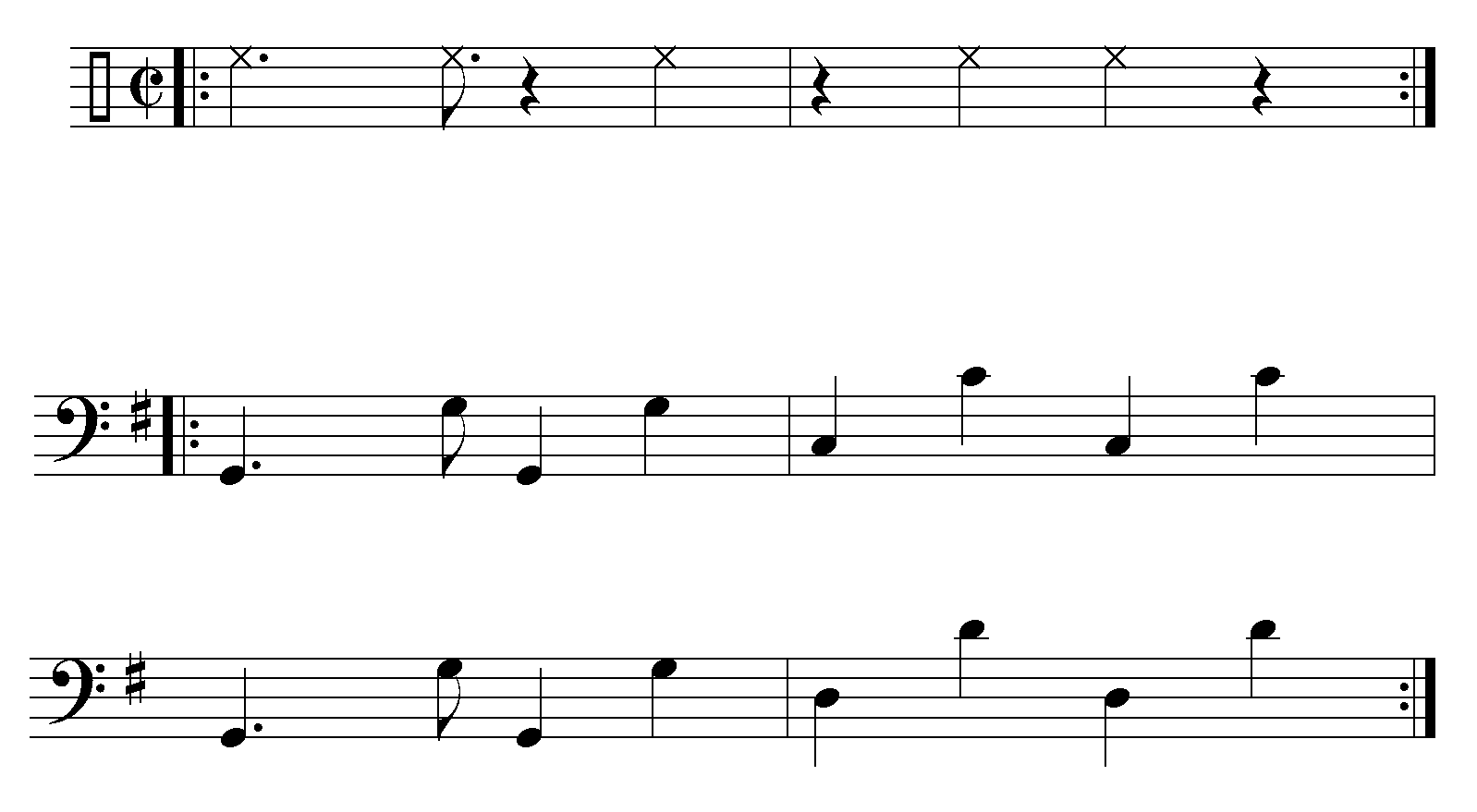
Top: clave; bottom: soukous bass line

Banning Eyre distills down the Congolese guitar style to this skeletal figure, where clave is sounded by the bass notes (notated with downward stems).

===== Highlife =====
Highlife was the most popular genre in Ghana and Nigeria during the 1960s. This arpeggiated highlife guitar part is essentially a guajeo. The rhythmic pattern is known in Cuba as baqueteo. The pattern of attack-points is nearly identical to the 3–2 clave motif guajeo shown earlier in this article. The bell pattern known in Cuba as clave, is indigenous to Ghana and Nigeria, and is used in highlife.

Top: clave. Bottom: highlife guitar part..

===== Afrobeat =====
The following afrobeat guitar part is a variant of the 2–3 onbeat/offbeat motif. Even the melodic contour is guajeo-based. 2–3 claves are shown above the guitar for reference only. The clave pattern is not ordinarily played in afrobeat.

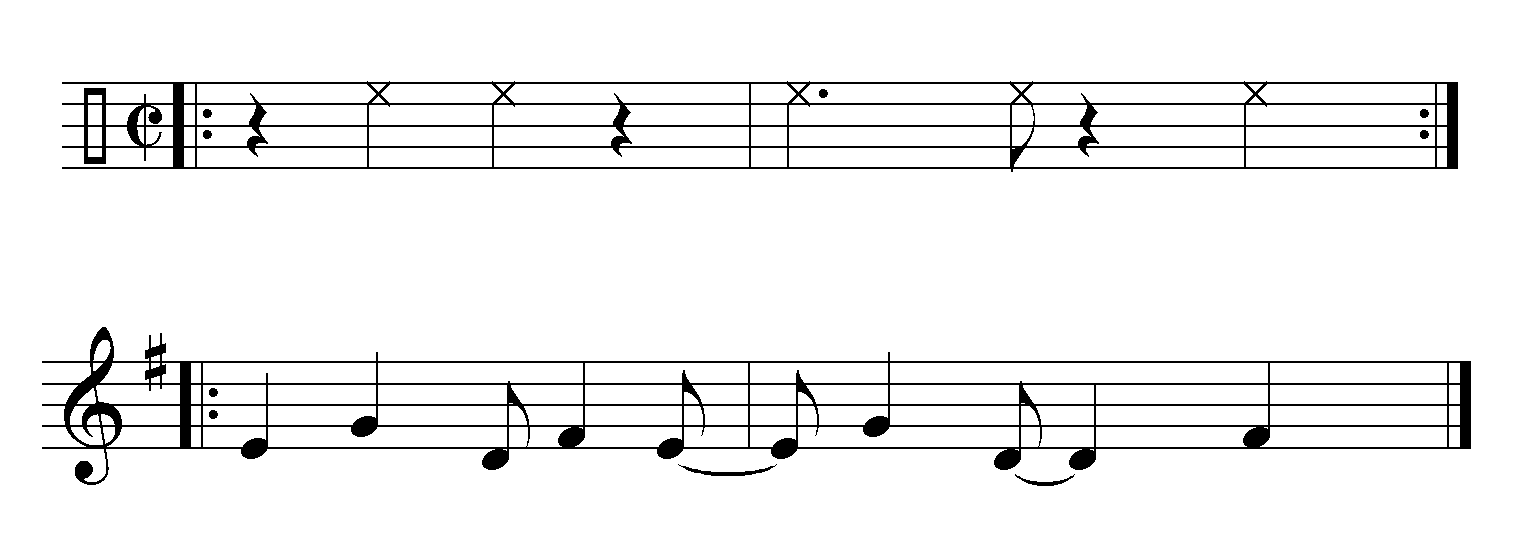
Top: 2–3 clave. Bottom: afrobeat guitar part.

=== Guide-patterns in Cuban versus non-Cuban music ===
There is some debate as to whether clave, as it appears in Cuban music, functions in the same way as its sister rhythms in other forms of music (Brazilian, North American and African). Certain forms of Cuban music demand a strict relationship between the clave and other musical parts, even across genres. This same structural relationship between the guide-pattern and the rest of the ensemble is found in many sub-Saharan rhythms, as well as rhythms from Haiti and Brazil, but the 3–2/2–3 concept and terminology are limited to certain types of Cuban-based popular music. In American pop music, the clave pattern tends to be used as an element of rhythmic color rather than a guide-pattern and as such is superimposed over many types of rhythms.

=== In Brazilian music ===
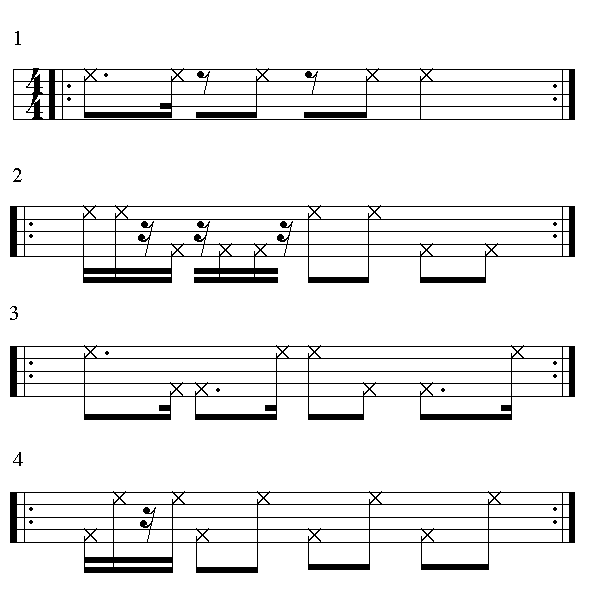
Afro-Brazilian bell patterns, 2, 3, 4

Both Cuba and Brazil imported Yoruba, Fon and Congolese slaves. Therefore, it is not surprising that we find the bell pattern the Cubans call clave in the Afro-Brazilian music of Macumba and Maculelê (dance). (Note: Recorded examples of “son clave” used in Brazilian Candomblé and Macumba rhythms: “Afro-Brasileiros” Batucada Fantastica v.4, Perrone, Luciano (1972: CD). “Avaninha / Vassi d'ogun” Musique du monde: Brésil Les Eaux d'Oxala, (1982: CD). “Opanije” The Yoruba / Dahomean Collection, (1998: CD). “Popolougumde” Pontos de Macumba (1999: CD). Recorded example of “son clave” used in Brazilian maculule: “Maculule” Brazil Capoeira Pereira, Nazare (2003: CD).) "Son clave" and "rumba clave" are also used as a tamborim part in some batucada arrangements. The structure of Afro-Brazilian bell patterns can be understood in terms of the clave concept (see below). Although a few contemporary Brazilian musicians have adopted the 3–2/2–3 terminology, it is traditionally not a part of the Brazilian rhythmic concept.

Bell pattern 1 is used in maculelê (dance) and some Candomblé and Macumba rhythms. Pattern 1 is known in Cuba as son clave. Bell 2 is used in afoxê and can be thought of as pattern 1 embellished with four additional strokes. Bell 3 is used in batucada. Pattern 4 is the maracatu bell and can be thought of as pattern 1 embellished with four additional strokes.

Example in a Pixinguinha choro music

==== Bossa nova pattern ====
Bossa nova stick pattern

The so-called "bossa nova clave" (or "Brazilian clave") has a similar rhythm to that of the son clave, but the second note on the two-side is delayed by one pulse (subdivision). The rhythm is typically played as a snare rim pattern in bossa nova music. The pattern is shown below in 2/4, as it is written in Brazil. In North American charts it is more likely to be written in cut-time.

According to drummer Bobby Sanabria the Brazilian composer Antonio Carlos Jobim, who developed the pattern, considers it to be merely a rhythmic motif and not a clave (guide pattern). Jobim later regretted that Latino musicians misunderstood the role of this bossa nova pattern.

==== Other Brazilian examples ====
The examples below are transcriptions of several patterns resembling the Cuban clave that is found in various styles of Brazilian music, on the ago-gô and surdo instruments.

Legend: Time signature: 2/4; L=low bell, H=high bell, O = open surdo hit, X = muffled surdo hit, and | divides the measure:

- Style: Samba 3:2; LL.L.H.H|L.L.L.H. (More common 3:2: .L.L.H.H|L.L.L.H.)
- Style: Maracatu 3:2; LH.HL.H.|L.H.LH.H
- Style: Samba 3:2; L|.L.L..L.|..L..L.L|
- Instrument: 3rd Surdo 2:3; X...O.O.|X...OO.O
- Variation of samba style: Partido Alto 2:3; L.H..L.L|.H..L.L.
- Style: Maracatu 2:3; L.H.L.H.|LH.HL.H.
- Style: Samba-Reggae or Bossanova 3:2; O..O..O.|..O..O..
- Style: Ijexa 3:2; LL.L.LL.|L.L.L.L. (HH.L.LL.|H.H.L.L.)

For 3rd example above, the clave pattern is based on a common accompaniment pattern played by the guitarist. B=bass note played by guitarist's thumb, C=chord played by fingers.

&|1 & 2 & 3 & 4 &|1 & 2 & 3 & 4 &||
C|B C . C B . C .|B . C . B C . C||

The singer enters on the wrong side of the clave and the ago-gô player adjusts accordingly. This recording cuts off the first bar so that it sounds like the bell comes in on the third beat of the second bar. This is suggestive of a pre-determined rhythmic relationship between the vocal part and the percussion and supports the idea of a clave-like structure in Brazilian music.

=== In Jamaican and French Caribbean music ===
The son clave rhythm is present in Jamaican mento music, and can be heard on 1950s-era recordings such as "Don’t Fence Her In", "Green Guava" or "Limbo" by Lord Tickler, "Mango Time" by Count Lasher, "Linstead Market/Day O" by The Wigglers, "Bargie" by The Tower Islanders, "Nebuchanezer" by Laurel Aitken and others. The Jamaican population is part of the same origin (Congo) as many Cubans, which perhaps explains the shared rhythm. It is also heard frequently in Martinique's biguine and Dominica's Jing ping. Just as likely however is the possibility that claves and the clave rhythm spread to Jamaica, Trinidad and the other small islands of the Caribbean through the popularity of Cuban son recordings from the 1920s onward.

=== Experimental clave music ===
==== Art music ====
External audio
- "Rumba Clave" (Roberto Vizcaiño)
- "Cross" (Eugene Novotney)

The clave rhythm and clave concept have been used in some modern art music ("classical") compositions. "Rumba Clave" by Cuban percussion virtuoso Roberto Vizcaiño has been performed in recital halls around the world. Another clave-based composition that has "gone global" is the snare drum suite "Cross" by Eugene D. Novotney.

==== Odd meter "clave" ====
External audio
- "Songo with Clave in 9" (Conor Guilfoyle)

Technically speaking, the term odd meter clave is an oxymoron. Clave consists of two even halves, in a divisive structure of four main beats. However, in recent years jazz musicians from Cuba and outside of Cuba have been experimenting with creating new "claves" and related patterns in various odd meters. Clave which is traditionally used in a divisive rhythm structure, has inspired many new creative inventions in an additive rhythm context.

. . . I developed the concept of adjusting claves to other time signatures, with varying degrees of success. What became obvious to me quite quickly was that the closer I stuck to the general rules of clave the more natural the pattern sounded. Clave has a natural flow with a certain tension and resolves points. I found if I kept these points in the new meters they could still flow seamlessly, allowing me to play longer phrases. It also gave me many reference points and reduced my reliance on "one"—Guilfoyle (2006: 10).

"Clave" in 5/2 after Guilfoyle

"Clave" in 7/4 after Guilfoyle

===== Recommended listening for odd-meter "clave" =====
Here are some examples of recordings that use odd meter clave concepts.

- Dafnis Prieto About the Monks (Zoho).
- Sebastian Schunke Symbiosis (Pimienta Records).
- Paoli Mejias Mi Tambor (JMCD).
- John Benitez Descarga in New York (Khaeon).
- Deep Rumba A Calm in the Fire of Dances (American Clave).
- Nachito Herrera Bembe en mi casa (FS Music).
- Bobby Sanabria Quarteto Aché (Zoho).
- Julio Barretto Iyabo (3d).
- Michel Camilo Triangulo (Telarc).
- Samuel Torres Skin Tones (www.samueltorres.com).
- Horacio "el Negro" Hernandez Italuba (Universal Latino).
- Tony Lujan Tribute (Bella Records).
- Edward Simon La bikina (Mythology).
- Jorge Sylvester In the Ear of the Beholder (Jazz Magnet).
- Uli Geissendoerfer "The Extension" (CMO)
- Manuel Valera In Motion (Criss Cross Jazz).

== See also ==
- Bo Diddley beat
- Sub-Saharan African music traditions

== Sources ==
- Mauleón, Rebeca (1993). Salsa Guidebook for Piano and Ensemble. Petaluma, California: Sher Music. ISBN 0-9614701-9-4.
- Moore, Kevin (2012). Understanding Clave and Clave Changes: Singing, Clapping and Dancing Exercises. Santa Cruz: Moore Music. ISBN 978-1-4664-6230-4.
- Novotney, Eugene N. (1998) "Thesis: The 3:2 Relationship as the Foundation of Timelines in West African Musics" (registration required) (), UnlockingClave.com. Urbana, IL: University of Illinois.
- Ortiz, Fernando (1950). La Africana De La Musica Folklorica De Cuba. Ediciones Universales, en español. Hardcover illustrated edition. ISBN 84-89750-18-1.
- Palmer, Robert (1979). A Tale of Two Cities: Memphis Rock and New Orleans Roll. Brooklyn. ISBN 978-0914678120
- Peñalosa, David (2009). The Clave Matrix; Afro-Cuban Rhythm: Its Principles and African Origins. Redway, CA: Bembe Inc. ISBN 1-886502-80-3.
- Peñalosa, David (2010). Rumba Quinto. Redway, CA: Bembe Books. ISBN 1-4537-1313-1.
- Stewart, Alexander (2000). "'Funky Drummer': New Orleans, James Brown and the Rhythmic Transformation of American Popular Music". Popular Music, v. 19, n. 3. Oct. 2000), p. 293-318. JSTOR 853638.
