= Rhythm in Sub-Saharan Africa =

Periodicity in music developed by sub-Saharan African peoples

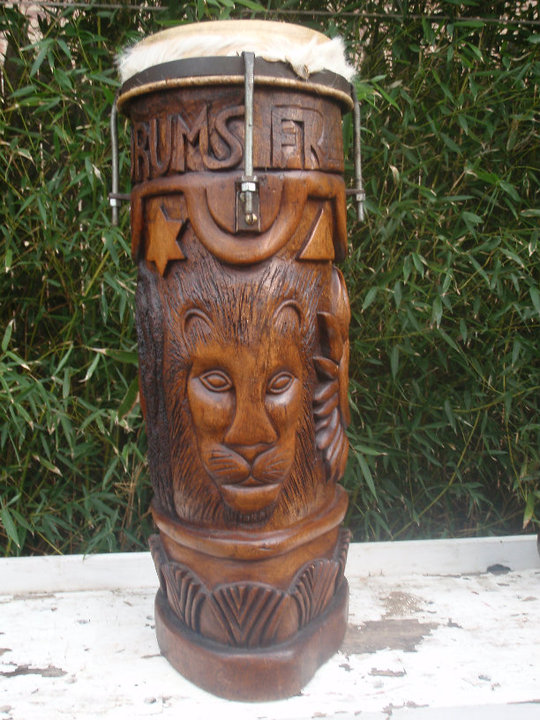
African drum made by Gerald Achee

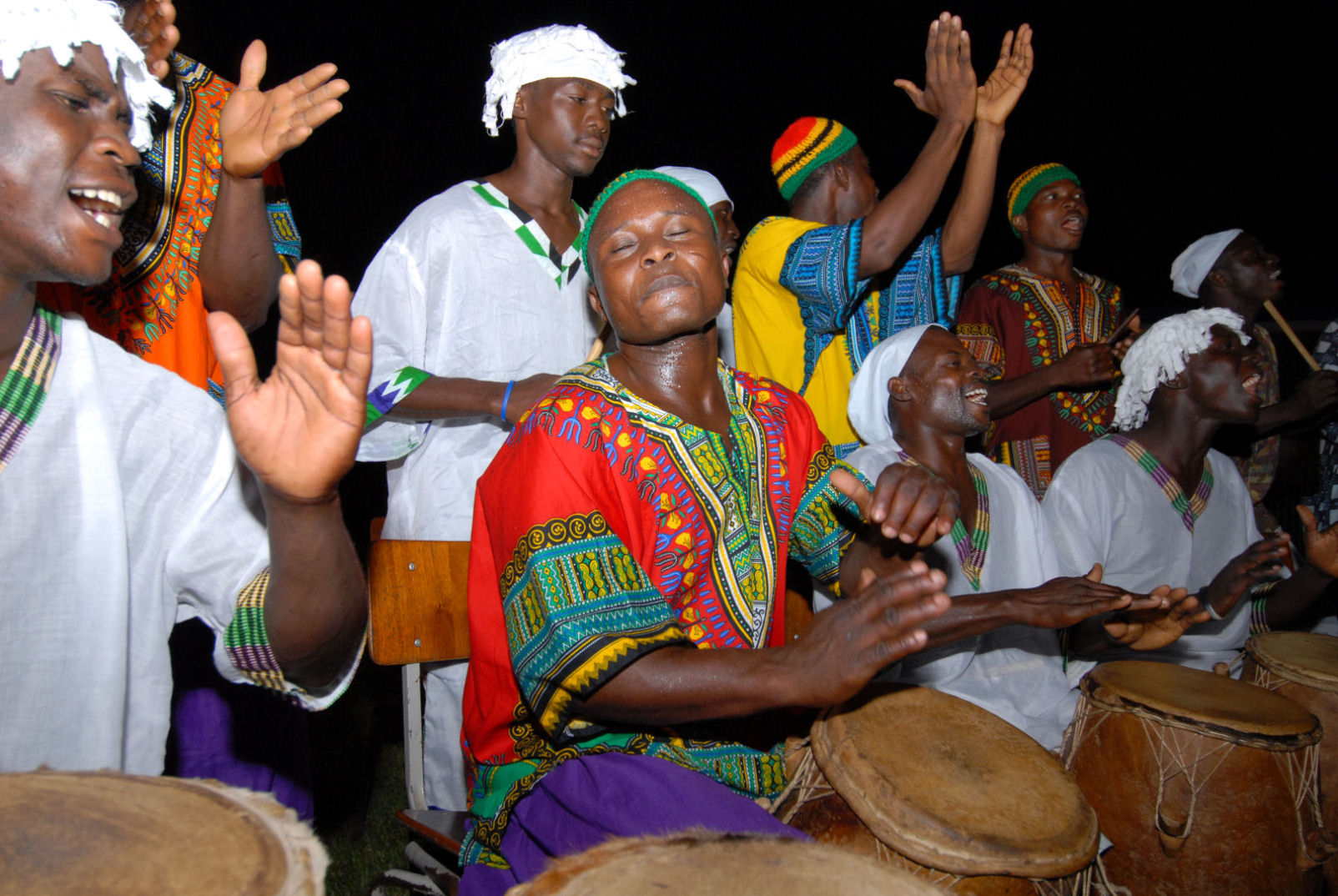
Drummers in Accra, Ghana

Sub-Saharan African music is characterised by a "strong rhythmic interest" that exhibits common characteristics in all regions of this vast territory, so that Arthur Morris Jones (1889–1980) has described the many local approaches as constituting one main system. C. K. Ladzekpo also affirms the profound homogeneity of approach. West African rhythmic techniques carried over the Atlantic were fundamental ingredients in various musical styles of the Americas: samba, forró, maracatu and coco in Brazil, Afro-Cuban music and Afro-American musical genres such as blues, jazz, rhythm & blues, funk, soul, reggae, hip hop, and rock and roll were thereby of immense importance in 20th century popular music. The drum is renowned throughout Africa.

== Rhythm in Sub-Saharan African culture ==
Map of African Linguistic Groups

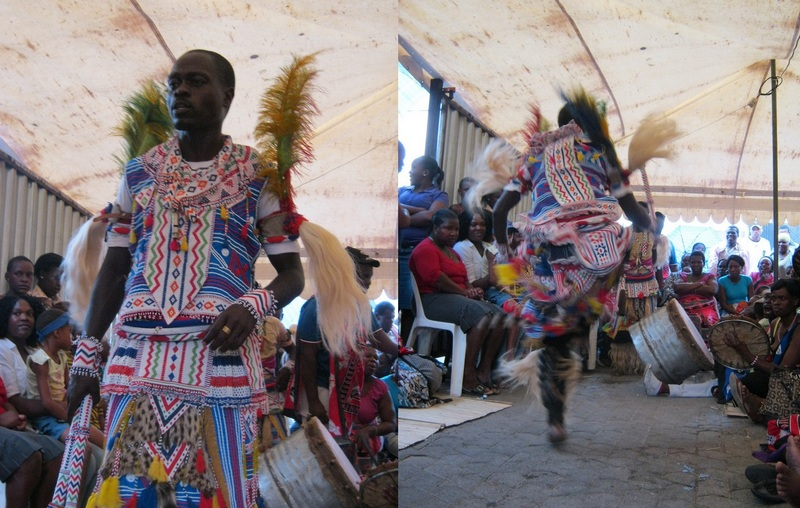
Traditional healer (sangoma) of South Africa dancing to the rhythm of the drum in celebration of his ancestors

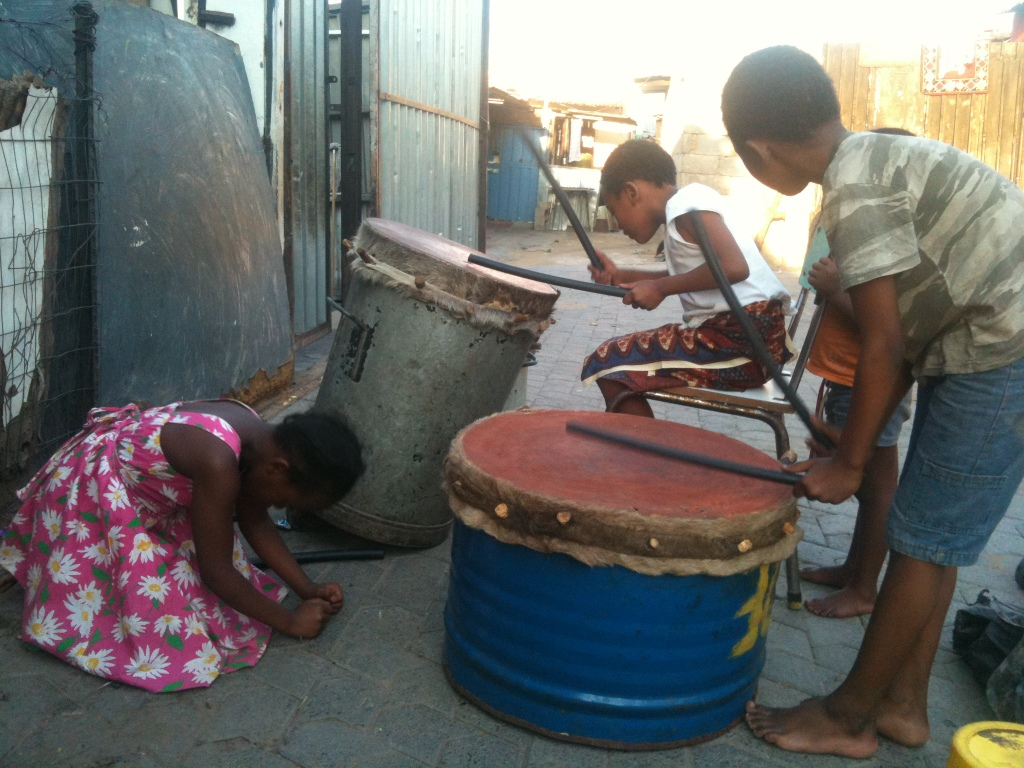
Kids in Alexandra township, South Africa, playing around on their father's drums

Cross-beats can symbolize challenging moments or emotional stress: playing them while fully grounded in the main beats prepares one for maintaining life-purpose while dealing with life's challenges. The sounding of three beats against two is experienced in everyday life and helps develop "a two-dimensional attitude to rhythm". Throughout Western and Central Africa child's play includes games that develop a feeling for multiple rhythms.

Among the characteristics of the Sub-Saharan African approach to rhythm are syncopation and cross-beats which may be understood as sustained and systematic polyrhythms, an ostinato of two or more distinct rhythmic figures, patterns or phrases at once. The simultaneous use of contrasting rhythmic patterns within the same scheme of accents or meter lies at the core of African rhythmic tradition. All such "asymmetrical" patterns are historically and geographically interrelated.

As a result of the migrations of Niger-Congo peoples (e.g., Bantu expansion), polyrhythmic culture (e.g., dance, music), which is generally associated with being a common trait among modern cultures of Africa, spread throughout Africa. Due to the Trans-Atlantic slave trade, music of the African diaspora, many of whom descend from Niger-Congo peoples, has had considerable influence upon modern Western forms of popular culture (e.g., dance, African-American music).

== Instruments ==
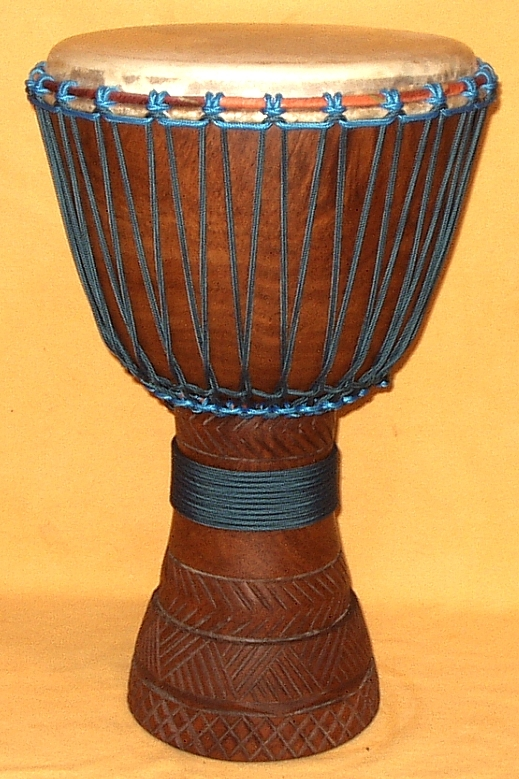
A djembe drum

African music relies heavily on fast-paced, upbeat rhythmic drum playing found all over the continent, though some styles, such as the Township music of South Africa do not make much use of the drum and nomadic groups such as the Maasai do not traditionally use drums. Elsewhere the drum is the sign of life: its beat is the heartbeat of the community.

Drums are classed as membranophones and consist of a skin or "drumhead" stretched over the open end of a frame or "shell". Well known African drums include the djembe and the talking drum.

Many aspects of African drumming, most notably time-keeping, stem from instruments such as shakers made of woven baskets or gourds or the double bell, made of iron and creating two different tones. Each region of Africa has developed a different style of double bell but the basic technology of bell-making is the same all over the continent, as is often the bell's role as time keeper. The South American agogo is probably a descendant from these African bells. Other idiophones include the Udu and the slit drum or log drum.

Tuned instruments such as the mbira and the marimba often have a short attack and decay that facilitates their rhythmic role.

== Cross-rhythm ==
African rhythmic structure is entirely divisive in nature but may divide time into different fractions at the same time, typically by the use of hemiola or three-over-two (3:2), which Novotney has called the foundation of all West African polyrhythmic textures. It is the interplay of several elements, inseparable and equally essential, that produces the "varying rhythmic densities or motions" of cross-rhythmic texture. 3 and 2 belong to a single Gestalt.

Cross-rhythm is the basis for much of the music of the Niger–Congo peoples, speakers of the largest language family in Africa. For example, it "pervades southern Ewe music". Cross-beat or Cross-rhythm is also a feature in traditional Sudanese music featuring complex, layered, and interlocking patterns often based on a 3:2 ratio like the Tumtum (or tum tum) rhythm common in the North and West of the country.

== Key patterns ==
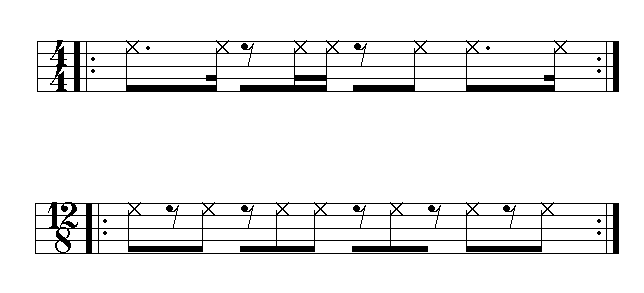
The standard bell pattern in simple and compound time.,, and for comparison.

Key patterns, also known as bell patterns, timeline patterns, guide patterns and phrasing referents express a rhythm's organizing principle, defining rhythmic structure and epitomizing the complete rhythmic matrix. They represent a condensed expression of all the movements open to musicians and dancers. Key patterns are typically clapped or played on idiophones such as bells, or else on a high-pitched drumhead. Musics organized around key patterns convey a two-celled (binary) structure, a complex level of African cross-rhythm.

=== The standard pattern ===
3.2 construction of standard compound-meter bell-pattern. The four notes at the bottom are the primary beats. The upper parts show; a) two cells of 3:2, beginning on beats 1 and 3; b) the same, beginning on beats 2 and 4; c) one cell of a) and one of b) giving d) the standard bell pattern notation

The most commonly used key pattern in sub-Saharan Africa is the seven-stroke figure known in ethnomusicology as the standard pattern. The standard pattern, composed of two cross-rhythmic fragments, is found both in simple (4/4 or 2/2) and compound (12/8 or 6/8) metrical structures.

Until the 1980s, this key pattern, common in Yoruba music, Ewe music and many other musics, was widely interpreted as composed of additive groupings. However the standard pattern represents not a series of durational values, but a series of attack points that divide the fundamental beat with a cross-rhythmnic structure.

=== Tresillo ===
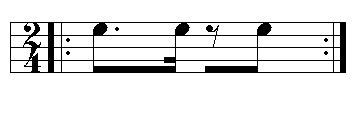
Tresillo.

The most basic duple-pulse figure found in Sub-Saharan African music is a figure the Cubans call tresillo, a Spanish word meaning 'triplet'. The basic figure is also found within a wide geographic belt stretching from Morocco in North Africa to Indonesia in South Asia. This pattern may have migrated east from North Africa to Asia with the spread of Islam: use of the pattern in Moroccan music can be traced back to Trans-Saharan exchanges during the Green Sahara.This influence increased due to slaves brought north across the Sahara Desert from present-day Mali. In African music, this is a cross-rhythmic fragment generated through cross-rhythm: 8 pulses ÷ 3 = 2 cross-beats (consisting of three pulses each) with a remainder of a partial cross-beat (spanning two pulses). In divisive form, the strokes of tresillo contradict the beats while in additive form, the strokes of tresillo are the beats. From a metrical perspective, the two ways of perceiving tresillo constitute two different rhythms. On the other hand, from the perspective of the pattern of attack-points, tresillo is a shared element of traditional folk music from the northwest tip of Africa to southeast tip of Asia.

== Sources ==
- Agawu, Kofi (2003). Representing African music : postcolonial notes, queries, positions. New York, N.Y.; London: Routledge. ISBN 0-415-94390-6.
- Novotney, Eugene D. (1998). The Three Against Two Relationship as the Foundation of Timelines in West African Musics. Urbana, IL: University of Illinois.
- Peñalosa, David (2009). Greenwood, Peter (ed.). The Clave Matrix: Afro-Cuban Rhythm : Its Principles and African Origins. Bembe Books. ISBN 978-1-886502-80-2.
- Ladzekpo, C. K. (1995). "The Myth of Cross-Rhythm", Foundation Course in African Dance-Drumming (webpage, accessed 24 April 2010).
