= Ewe music =

Music of the Ewe people of Ghana, Togo and Benin

Ewe music is the music of the Ewe people of Togo, Ghana, and Benin, West Africa. Instrumentation is primarily percussive and rhythmically the music features great metrical complexity. Its highest form is in dance music including a drum orchestra, but there are also work (e.g. the fishing songs of the Anlo migrants), play, and other songs. Ewe music is featured in A. M. Jones's Studies in African Music.

== Characteristics ==
Jones describes two "rules" (p. 24 and p. 17, capitalization his):

1. The Unit of Time Rule or the Rule of Twos and Threes: "African [Ewe] phrases are built up of the numbers 2 or 3, or their multiples: or of a combination of 2 and 3 or of the multiples of this combination. Thus a phrase of 10 will be (2 + 3) + (2 + 3) or (2 + 2 + 2) + 4.
2. The Rule of Repeats: "The repeats within an African [Ewe] song are an integral part of it." If a song is formally "A + A + B + B + B" one cannot leave out, say, one of the B sections.

He also lists the following "Features of African [Ewe] Music" (p. 49):

1. "Songs appear to be in free rhythm but most of them have a fixed time-background.
2. The rule of 2 and 3 in the metrical build of songs.
3. Nearly all rhythms which are used in combination are made from simple aggregates of a basic time-unit. A quaver is always a quaver.
4. The claps or other time-background impart no accent what-ever to the song.
5. African [Ewe] melodies are additive: their time-background is divisive.
6. The principle of cross-rhythms.
7. The rests within and at the end of a song before repeats are an integral part of it.
8. Repeats are an integral part of the song: they result in many variations of the call and response form (see summary).
9. The call and response type of song is usual in Africa [sic].
10. African [Ewe] melodies are diatonic: the major exception being the sequence dominant-sharpened subdominant-dominant.
11. Short triplets are occasionally used.
12. The teleological trend: many African [Ewe] songs lean towards the ends of the lines: it is at the ends where they are likely to coincide with their time-background.
13. Absence of the fermata."

== Cross-rhythmic structure ==
The ethnomusicologist David Locke states: "Cross-rhythm pervades Ewe drumming." In fact, the overall rhythmic structure is generated through cross-rhythm. Cross-rhythm was first identified as the basis of sub-Saharan rhythm in the early writings of A.M. Jones, and was later explained in great detail in lectures by the Ewe master drummer and scholar C.K. Ladzekpo, and in the writings of Locke.

At the center of a core of rhythmic traditions within which the composer conveys his ideas is the technique of cross rhythm. The technique of cross rhythm is a simultaneous use of contrasting rhythmic patterns within the same scheme of accents or meter.

In Anlo-Ewe cultural understanding, the technique of cross rhythm is a highly developed systematic interplay of varying rhythmic motions simulating the dynamics of contrasting moments or emotional stress phenomena likely to occur in actual human existence.

As a preventive prescription for extreme uneasiness of mind or self-doubt about one's capacity to cope with impending or anticipated problems, these simulated stress phenomena or cross-rhythmic figures are embodied in the art of dance-drumming as mind-nurturing exercises to modify the expression of the inherent potential of the human thought in meeting the challenges of life. The premise is that by rightly instituting the mind in coping with these simulated emotional stress phenomena, intrepidity is achieved.

Intrepidness, or resolute fearlessness, in Anlo-Ewe view, is an extraordinary strength of mind. It raises the mind above the troubles, disorders and emotions which the anticipation or sight of great perils is calculated to excite. It is by this strength that ordinary people become heroes, by maintaining themselves in a tranquil state of mind and preserving the free use of their reason under most surprising and terrible circumstances—Ladzekpo (1995: Web).

=== 3:2 (hemiola) ===
The most fundamental cross-rhythm in Ewe music, and Sub-Saharan African music traditions in general, is three-against-two (3:2), or six-against-four (6:4), also known as a vertical hemiola. The cycle of two or four beats are the main beat scheme, while the triple beat scheme is secondary. Ladzekpo states: "The term secondary beat scheme refers to a component beat scheme of a cross rhythm other than the main beat scheme. In a similar manner as a main beat, each secondary beat is distinguished by measuring off a distinct number of pulsations. A recurrent grouping of a number of these beats in a musical period forms a distinct secondary beat scheme."

We have to grasp the fact that if from childhood you are brought up to regard beating 3 against 2 as being just as normal as beating in synchrony, then you develop a two dimensional attitude to rhythm… This bi-podal conception is… part of the African's nature—Jones (1959: 102)

Novotney observes: "The 3:2 relationship (and [its] permutations) is the foundation of most typical polyrhythmic textures found in West African musics." 3:2 is the generative or theoretic form of sub-Saharan rhythmic principles. Agawu succinctly states: "[The] resultant [3:2] rhythm holds the key to understanding . . . there is no independence here, because 2 and 3 belong to a single Gestalt."

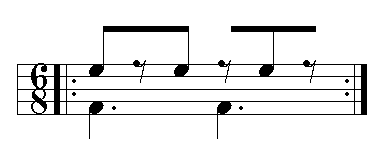
Three-over-two cross-rhythm.

=== 3:8 ===
The following bell pattern is used in the Ewe rhythm kadodo. The 24-pulse pattern crosses the barline, contradicting the meter with three sets of five strokes, across eight main beats (two measures of four main beats each). The three single strokes are muted. The kadodo bell pattern is an embellishment of three "slow" cross-beats spanning two measures, or three-over-eight (3:8). Within the context of a single four-beat cycle (single measure), the cross-rhythmic ratio is 1.5:4.

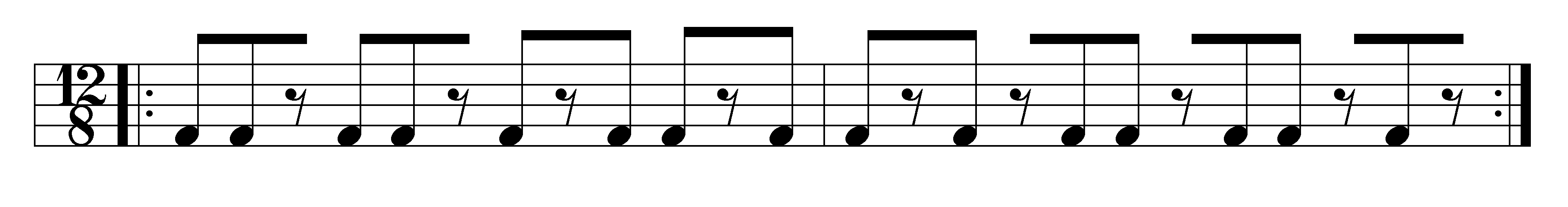
kadodo bell pattern

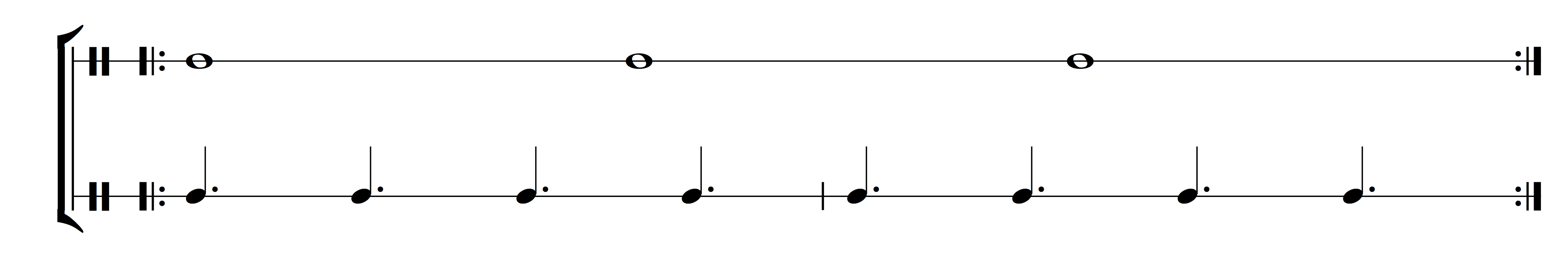
3:8 or 1.5:4

== Instruments ==
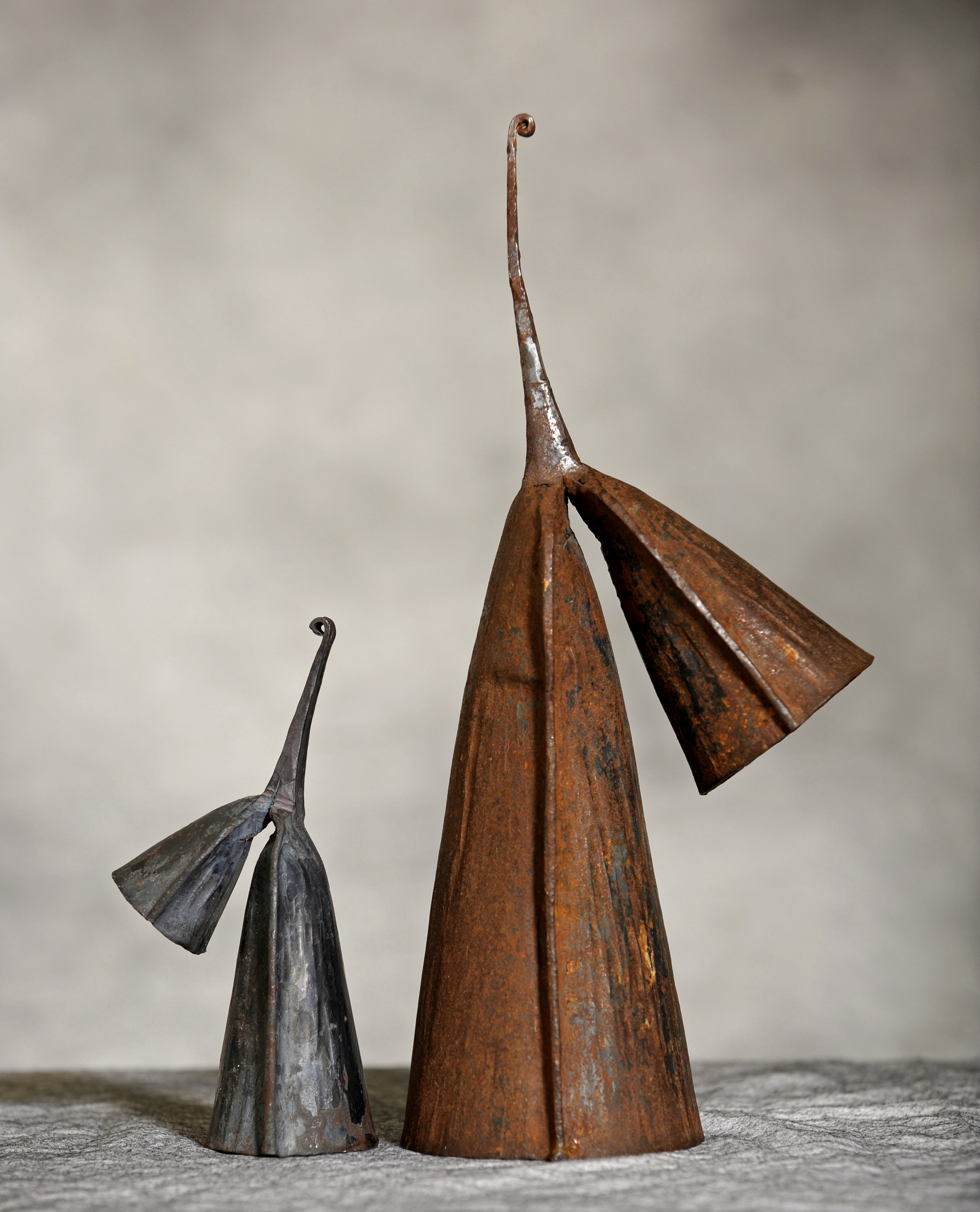
Gankoqui bells

=== Bell and rattle ===
The atoke, gankogui, and axatse sound the rhythmic foundation. The atoke is a high pitched gong played with an iron rod. The Gankogui is a clapperless double bell that is pounded in shape rather than cast. It produces much less audible high partials than western bells ("purer" fundamental) and is played with a stick. It produces two notes each of which vary and must vary among gankogui so they may be used together. The gankogui plays a key pattern, or guide pattern, which the orchestra builds upon, although the tempo is set by the master drummer. Many bell patterns from 8 to 24 pulses are used, but the most common key pattern is the 12-pulse basic Ewe, or standard pattern.

=== Standard pattern ===
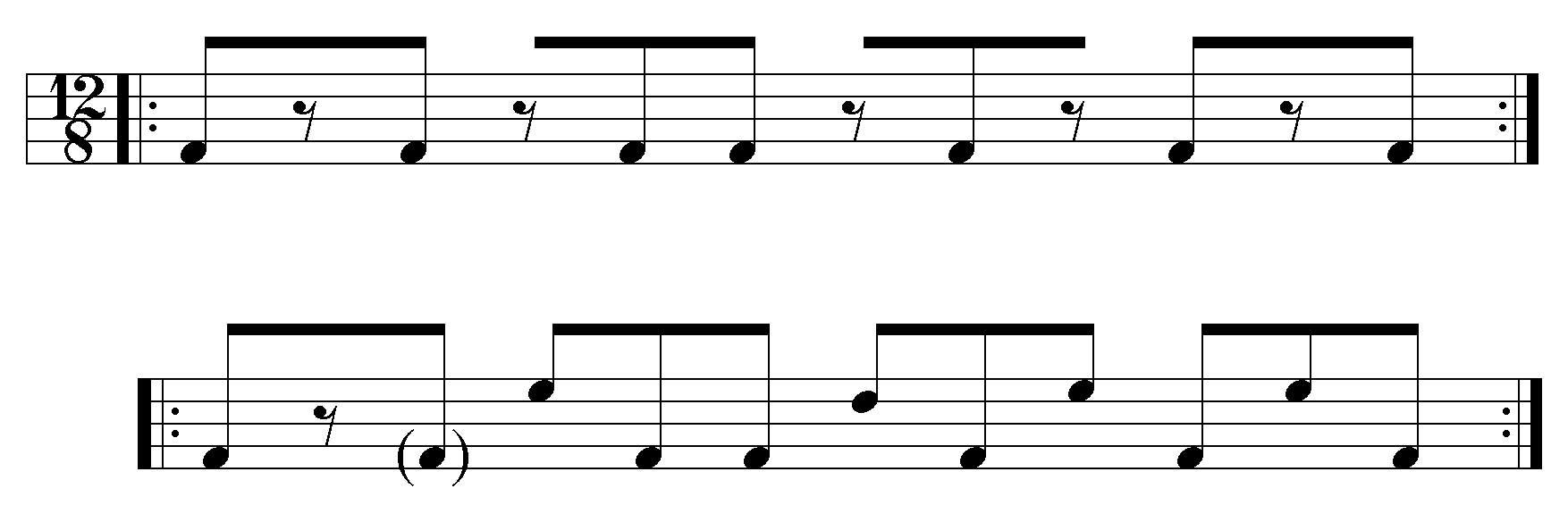
Standard bell pattern (top) with accompanying axatse part (bottom). The axatse begins on the second stroke (in parentheses)

The axatse is a rattle—a beaded gourd instrument. The axatse part which accompanies the standard pattern is: "pa ti pa pa ti pa ti pa ti pa pa." The "pa's" sound the standard pattern by striking the gourd against the knee. The "ti's" sound pulses in between the bell strokes, by raising the gourd in an upward motion and striking it with the free hand. As is common with many African rhythms, the axatse part begins (first "pa") on the second stroke of the bell (1a), and the last "pa" coincides with 1. By ending on the beginning of the cycle, the axatse part contributes to the cyclic nature of the overall rhythm.

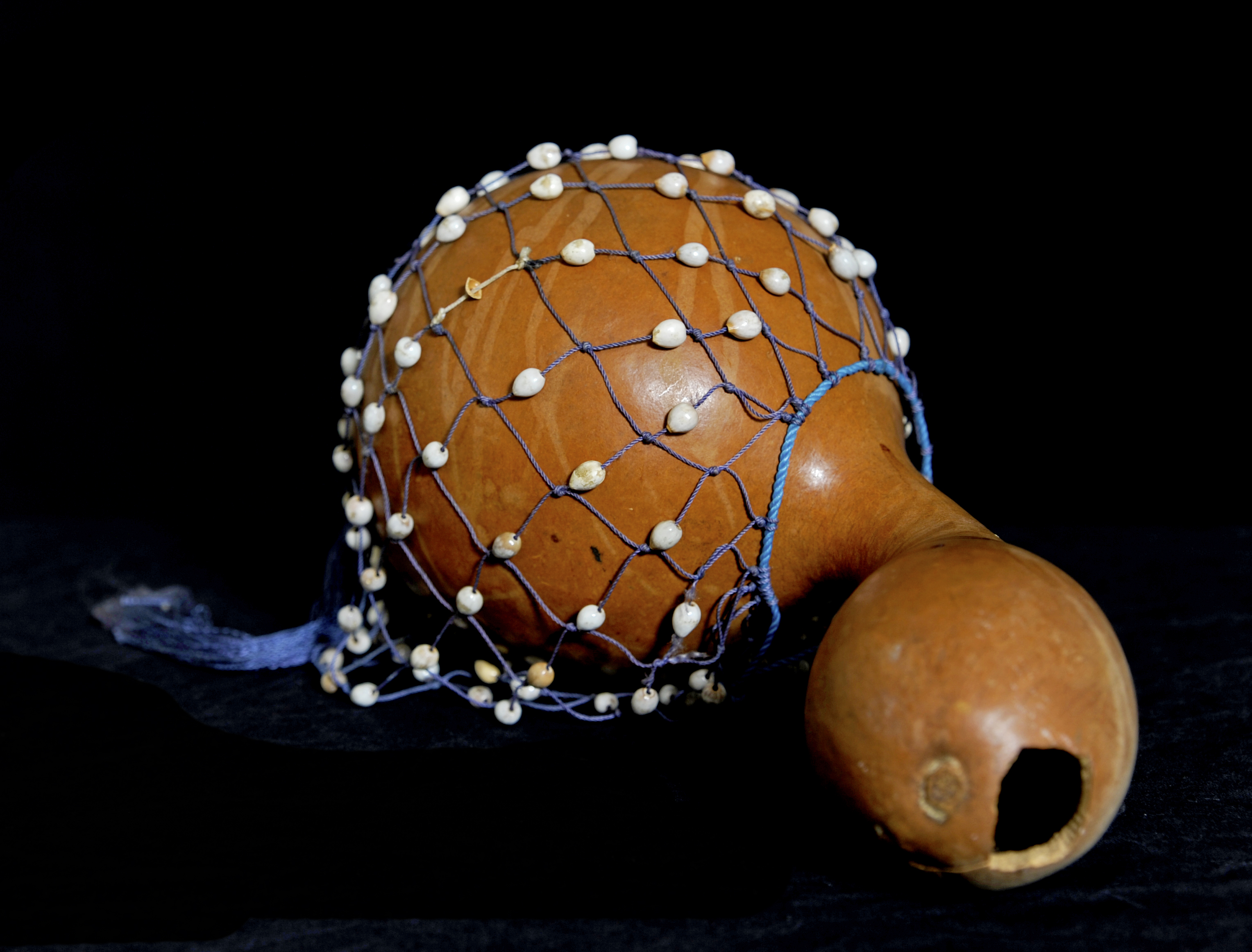
Axatse

See: standard bell with accompanying axatse part. Atsiagbekor.

=== Drums ===
Master drum: Atsimewu Asiwui: Sogo, Kidi, Kagan, Bell, Shakers

Dagbamba: Talking drum, Brekete drum

=== Claps and song ===
Voice and hands.

== See also ==
- Ewe drumming
- Robert Ayitee, Ewe master drummer
- King Mensah
