= Klaus Wachsmann =

Klaus Philipp Wachsmann (8 March 1907 – 17 July 1984) was a British ethnomusicologist of German birth. Born in 1907 in Berlin, he is considered a pioneer in the study of the traditional musics of Africa. His studies in Germany (on pre-Gregorian chant under mentor Erich von Hornbostel) were interrupted by the rise of the Nazis in 1933, where he was also forbidden to marry his 'Aryan' fiancée Eva Buttenburg, a singer. Consequently, they both migrated to Britain in 1936.

While in the UK Wachsmann gained funding by the Society for the Protection of Science and Learning to study African languages at the School of Oriental and African Studies in London. His wife worked as a voice coach. With help from the Church Missionary Society they then moved to Uganda in 1937, where Wachsmann compiled an extensive collection of field recordings between 1949 and 1952. The full collection was originally deposited at the British Library where they form part of the World and Traditional Music collection. He founded the International Folk Music Council, where he first met Charles Seeger, subsequently a lifelong friend.

After a year's leave in England was appointed as founding curator of Kampala's Uganda Museum, where he stayed until 1957. In order to present music as a living experience he employed professional musicians as museum attendants who gave performances every day. Many of his photographic records are housed at Makerere University.

In 1957 he and his wife returned to England, where he was put in charge of ethnological collections at the Wellcome Foundation. He had hoped to find a teaching position at a British University, but failed to do so. So in 1963 they moved to the US, where Wachsmann was appointed Professor of Music at the University of California, Los Angeles from 1963 to 1968. During the 1970s he continued teaching at various locations (Illinois, Texas, Edinburgh, Belfast, Cologne) and in 1975 established a home back in England, at a stone cottage in Tisbury, Wiltshire. He became a contributor on musical instruments and ethnomusicology to the New Grove Dictionary of 1980.

His book Essays on Music and History in Africa was published in 1971. He died in 1984 at home aged 77, survived by his wife Eva and two children, Katrin and Philipp Wachsmann.

== See also ==
Arthur Morris Jones
