= Bell pattern =

Rhythmic pattern of striking a hand-held bell or other instrument

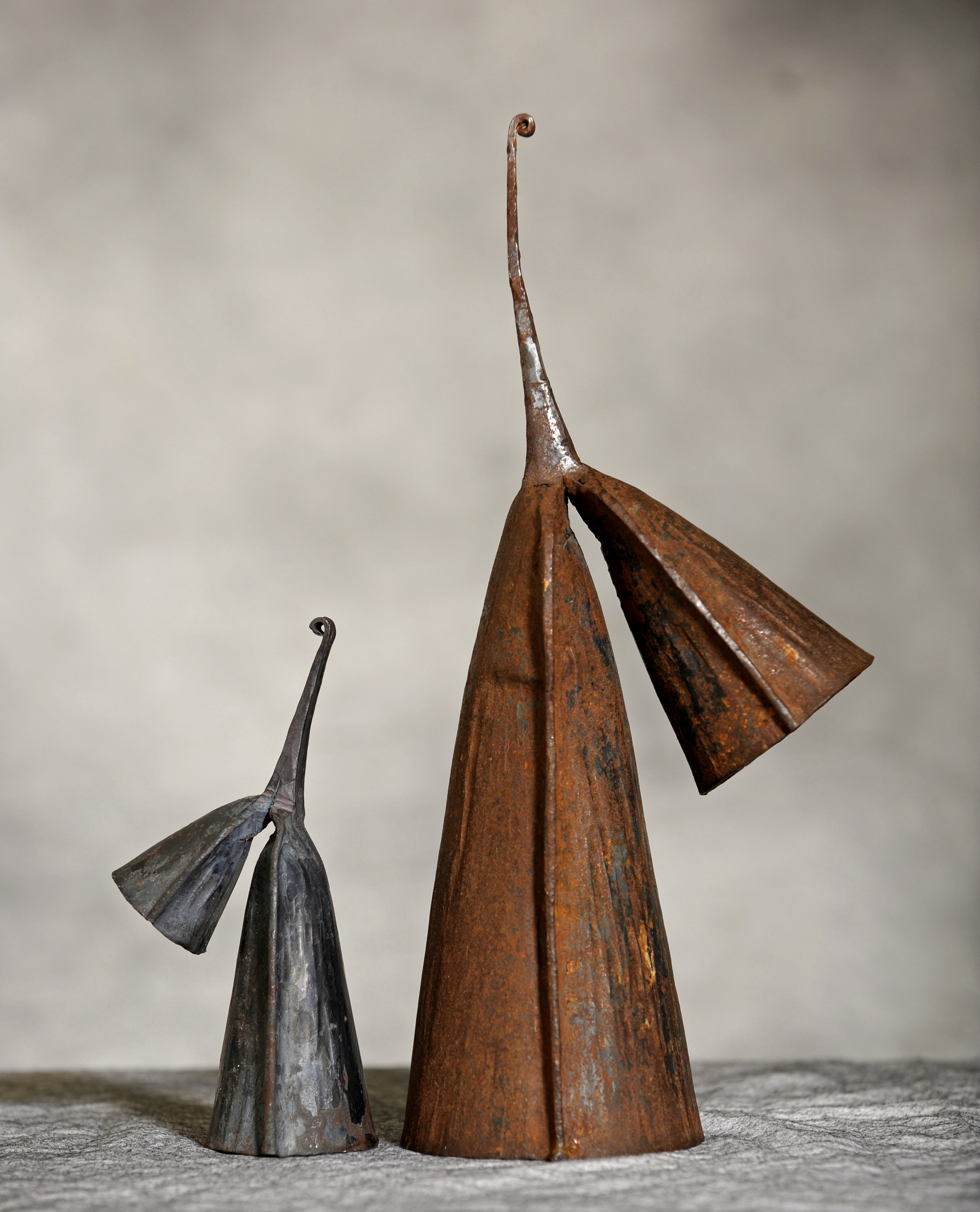
Ghanaian iron gankoqui bells.

A bell pattern is a rhythmic pattern of striking a hand-held bell or other instrument of the idiophone family, to make it emit a sound at desired intervals. It is often a key pattern (also known as a guide pattern, phrasing referent, timeline, or asymmetrical timeline), in most cases it is a metal bell, such as an agogô, gankoqui, or cowbell, or a hollowed piece of wood, or wooden claves. In band music, bell patterns are also played on the metal shell of the timbales, and drum kit cymbals.

== Sub-Saharan African music ==
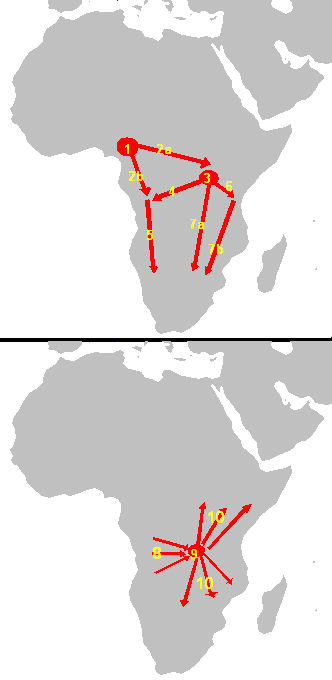
Bantu migrations: 1 = 2000–1500 BC origin; 2 = ca.1500 BC first migrations; 2.a = Eastern Bantu; 2.b = Western Bantu; 3 = 1000–500 BC Urewe nucleus of Eastern Bantu; 4–7 = southward advance; 9 = 500 BC–0 Congo nucleus; 10 = 0–1000 AD last phase

Use of African bell patterns is found primarily within the Niger–Congo language family (yellow and yellow-green).

Gerhard Kubik notes that key patterns are not universally found in sub-Saharan Africa: "Their geographical distribution mainly covers those parts of Africa where I.A.4 (Kwa languages) and the 'western stream' of the I.A.5 (Benue–Congo languages), or 'Bantu' languages are spoken, with offshoots into the Lower Zambezi valley and the Nyasa/Ruvuma area in southeast Africa" [within the larger Niger–Congo-B group]. Use of the patterns has since spread throughout the greater Niger–Congo language family. The use of iron bells (gongs) in sub-Saharan African music is linked to the early iron-making technology spread by the great Bantu migrations. The spread of the African bell patterns is probably similarly linked.

Throughout Africa, wherever these gongs have occurred they have been manufactured by the same process of welding the two halves together along a wide flange. This indicates a common origin.

— James Walton, (1955: 22)

Kubik observes that "at the broadest level," the various key patterns "are all interrelated." Key patterns exist in their own right, as well as in relation to the three inner reference levels of elementary pulsation, main reference beat, and primary cycle. Kubik further states that key patterns represent the structural core of a musical piece, something like a condensed and extremely concentrated expression of the motional possibilities open to the participants (musicians and dancers).

[Key patterns] express the rhythm’s organizing principle, defining rhythmic structure, as scales or tonal modes define harmonic structure . . . Put simply, key patterns epitomize the complete rhythmic matrix.

— David Peñalosa, (2009: 51)

Key patterns are generated through cross-rhythm. They typically consist of 12 or 16 pulses, and have a bipartite structure, which evenly divides the pattern into two rhythmically opposed cells of 6 or 8 pulses each. The key pattern defines the musical period; the first cell is antecedent, and the second is consequent. The asymmetrical array of attack-points contradicts the metrical symmetry of the two cells.

=== Standard pattern ===
Standard pattern in duple-pulse (4/4) and triple-pulse (12/8) form (and.

The most commonly used key pattern in sub-Saharan Africa is the seven-stroke figure known in ethnomusicology as the standard pattern, or bembé. The standard pattern is expressed in both a triple-pulse (12/8 or 6/8) and a duple-pulse (4/4 or 2/2) structure. Many North American percussionists refer to the triple-pulse form as the 6/8 bell. The standard pattern has strokes on: 1, 1a, 2& 2a, 3&, 4, 4a.

In 12/8:

1 & a 2 & a 3 & a 4 & a ||
X . X . X X . X . X . X ||

In 4/4:

1 e & a 2 e & a 3 e & a 4 e & a ||
X . . X . . X X . . X . X . . X ||

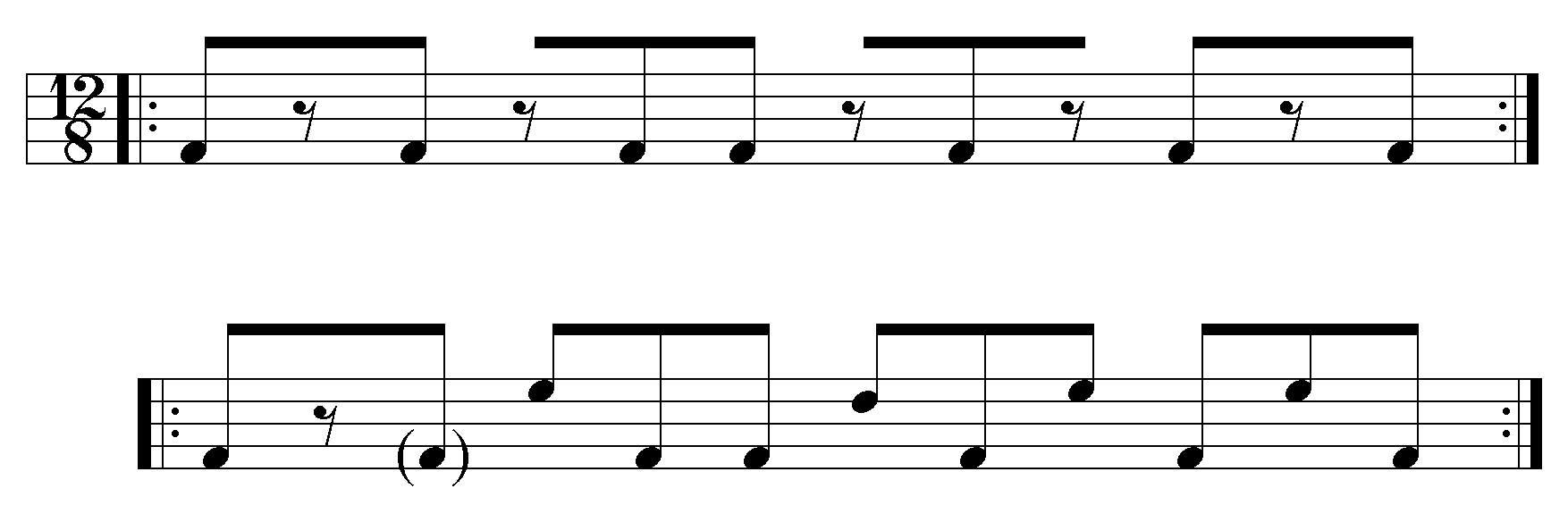
Standard bell pattern (top) with accompanying axatse part (bottom). The axatse begins on the second stroke (in parentheses)

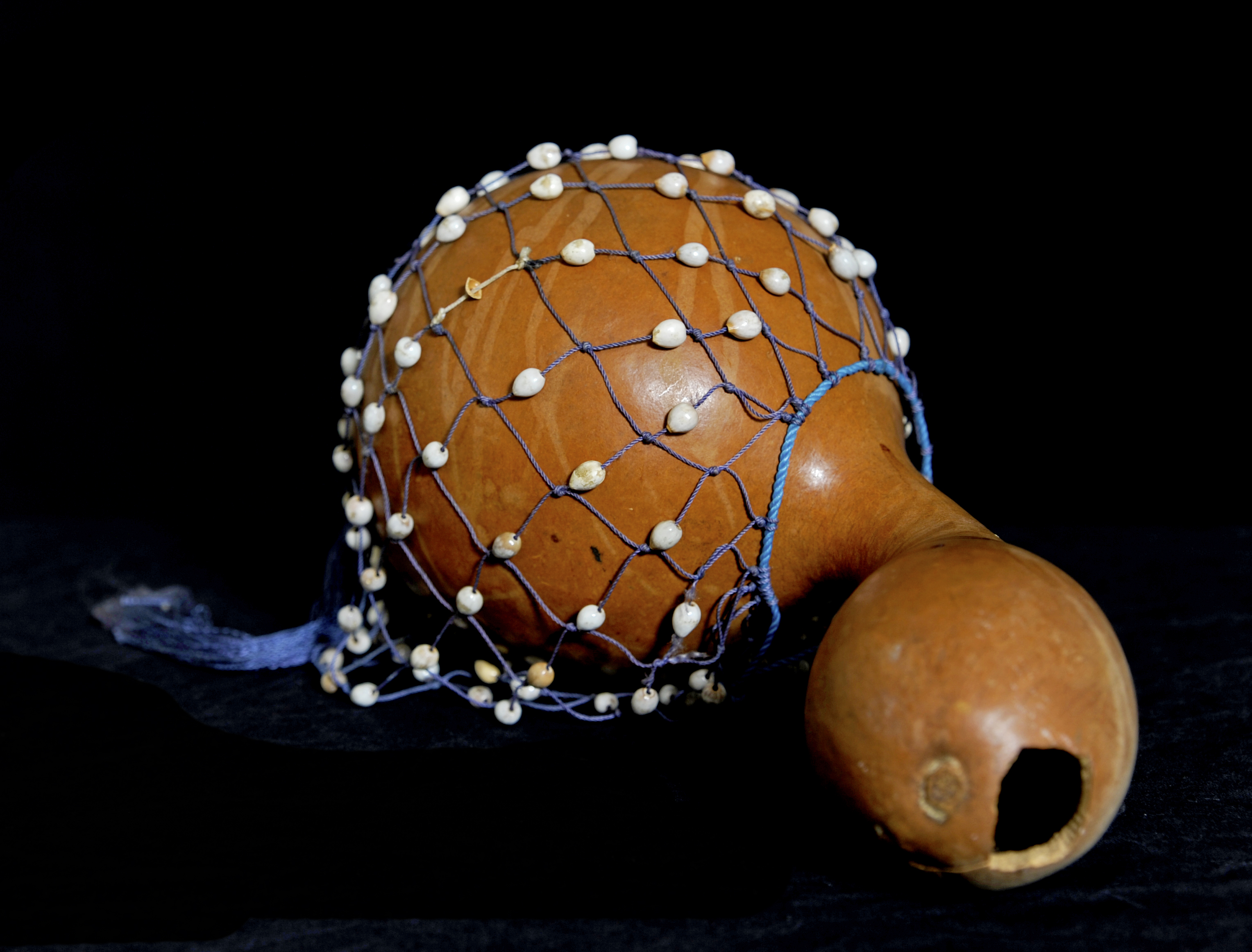
Axatse

The axatse (Ghanaian beaded gourd instrument) part which typically accompanies the 12-pulse standard pattern in Ewe music is verbalized as: "pa ti pa pa ti pa ti pa ti pa pa". The "pa"s sound the standard pattern by striking the gourd against the knee. The "ti"s sound pulses in between the bell strokes, by raising the gourd in an upward motion and striking it with the free hand. As is common with many African rhythms, the axatse part begins (first "pa") on the second stroke of the bell (1a), and the last "pa" coincides with 1. By ending at the beginning of the cycle, the axatse part contributes to the cyclic nature of the overall rhythm. See: standard bell with accompanying axatse part. Atsiagbekor.

=== 12/8 bell patterns ===
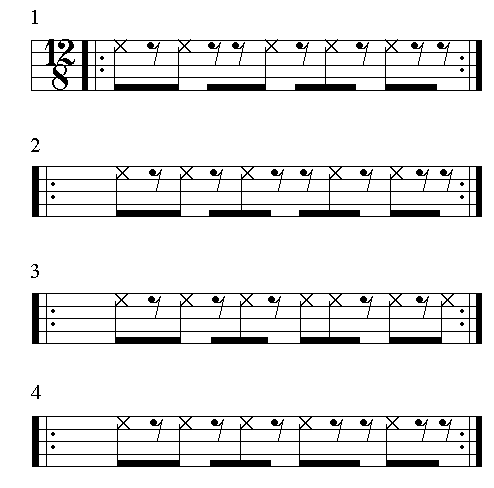
Triple-pulse (12/8) African bell patterns (2, 3, 4)

There are many different triple-pulse bell patterns found in sub-Saharan Africa. These are but a small sample. Bell patterns 1 and 2 are considered by A. M. Jones to be the two simplified forms of the standard pattern. Pattern 2 was the first African bell pattern to be transcribed. Pattern 2 contains exactly the same pattern of attack-points as Pattern 1, but begins on a different stroke, has a different relationship to the main beats, and therefore, is a related, but different key pattern. Pattern 3 is another variant of the standard pattern, one which contains exactly the same pattern of attack-points as the standard pattern, but in a different relationship to the main beats. The geographical border of Pattern 3 seems to be the Niger River. Kubik states that east of the Niger, Pattern 3 is used "among the Igbo, and the large group of Benue-Congo speakers from eastern Nigeria through western Cameroon, down to southern Democratic Republic of the Congo, eastern Angola and northern Zambia." The pattern is also used in Cuba and Haiti. Pattern 4 is a bell pattern used by the Hausa people of Nigeria. It is also used in the Cuban-Congolese rhythm palo. The figure is sometimes referred to as a horizontal hemiola.

Three-beat cycle bell patterns

There is a category of 12/8 bell patterns based on "slow" cycles of three cross-beats across four or eight main beats. Three-over-eight (3:8) is one of the most metrically contradictive, and extraordinarily dynamic cross-rhythms found in African music. Within the context of a single four-beat cycle (single measure or musical period), the cross-rhythmic ratio is 1.5:4. The three cross-beats, spanning 24 pulses, are represented as whole-notes below for visual emphasis.

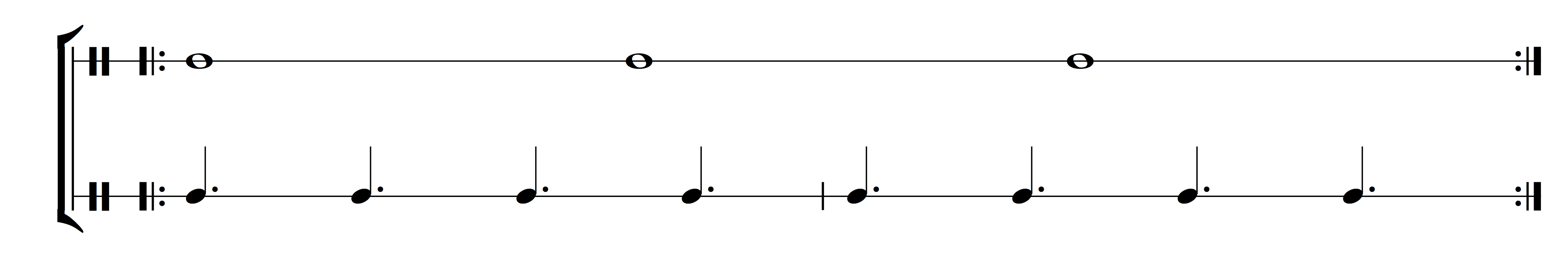
Three cross-beats across two main beat cycles (two measures). This is the cross-rhythmic ratio of 3:8, or within the context of a single measure, 1.5:4.

The following 24-pulse bell pattern is used in the Ewe rhythm kadodo. The three single strokes are muted. The kadodo bell pattern is an embellishment of three "slow" cross-beats spanning two measures, or three-over-eight (3:8).

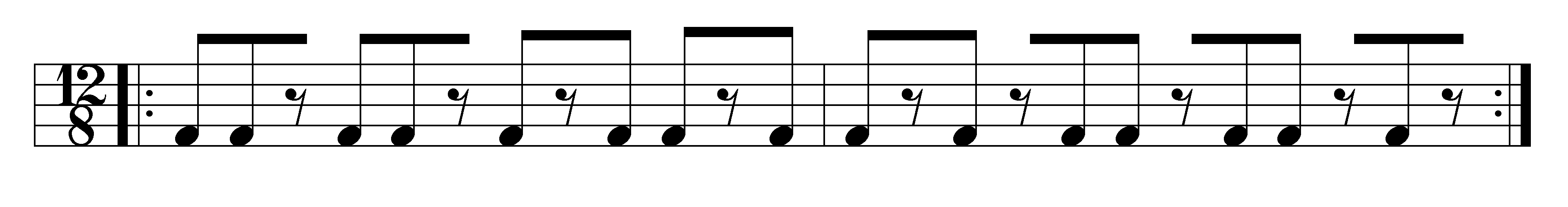
kadodo bell pattern built upon the 3:8 or 1.5:4 cross-rhythm.

=== 4/4 bell patterns ===
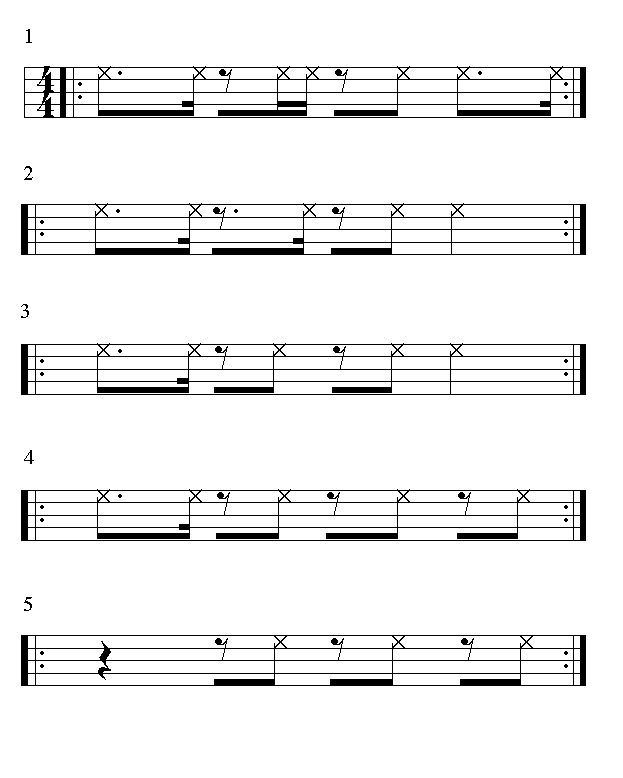
Duple-pulse (4/4) African bell patterns (2, 3, 4, 5)

Pattern 1 (4/4 standard pattern) is played on the head of a small Yoruba bata drum in Benin. Pattern 2 is used by the Yoruba and Igbo people of Nigeria. Pattern 3 is the bell part in fufume (Ghana). Pattern 4 is used by the Ewe people (Ghana) for the rhythm gahu. Patterns 3 and 5 are used in the Ghanaian rhythm Kpanlogo by the Ga people and Borborbor by the Ewe people . Patterns 2 and 3 are known in Cuba as rumba clave and son clave respectively.

=== Single-celled bell patterns ===
Some bell patterns are single-celled and therefore, not key patterns. A single-celled pattern cycles over two main beats, while a two-celled key pattern cycles over four main beats. The most basic single-celled pattern in duple-pulse structure consists of three strokes, known in Cuban music as tresillo.

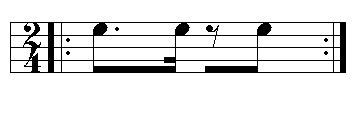
The "tresillo" (Cuban term) is the most basic single-celled figure in duple-pulse structure.

The five-stroke "cinquillo" (Cuban term) is a common single-celled variant (two additional strokes).

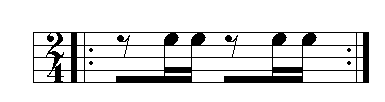
In some rhythms the bell just plays repeating cycles of offbeats.

== Metric structure ==
=== Divisive rhythm versus additive rhythm ===
Sub-Saharan African rhythm is divisive rhythm. However, perhaps because of their seemingly asymmetric structure, bell patterns are sometimes perceived in an additive rhythmic form. For example, Justin London describes the five-stroke version of the standard pattern as "2-2-3-2-3", while Godfried Toussaint describes the seven-stroke form as "2-2-1-2-2-2-1." The following example of the five-stroke standard pattern is represented within an additive structure: 2+2+3+2+3.

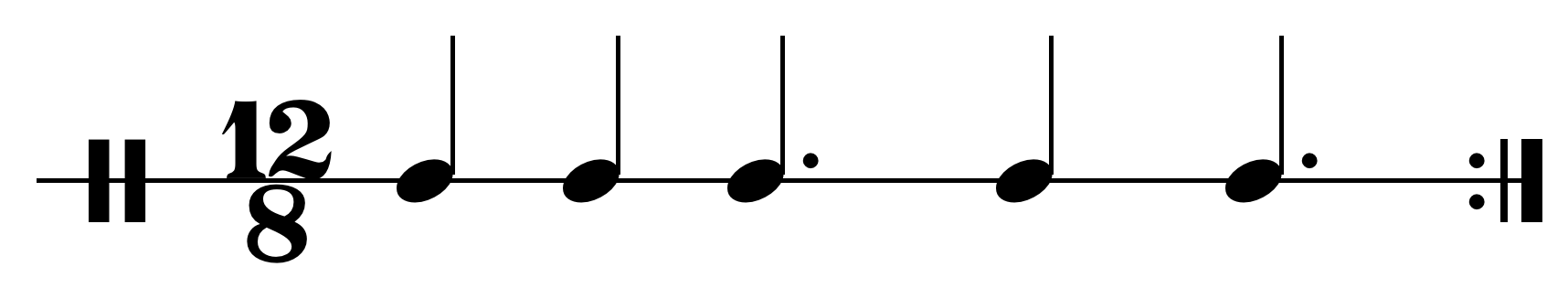
The example above is notated in additive form, with the notes sustained between each interonset interval, thus only quarter and dotted-quarter notes rather than only eighth notes and eighth rests.

The bell pattern, and every aspect of the overall rhythm, is considered divisive within both cultural understanding, and by most contemporary music theoreticians. Novotney states: "The African rhythmic structure which generates the standard pattern is a divisive structure and not an additive one . . . the standard pattern represents a series of attack points, . . . not a series of durational values." Kubik concurs: "Although on the level of structural analysis it cannot be denied that different 'distances' of strokes, combining two or three elementary pulses, are 'added up' within the cycle, performers do not think of time-line patterns as 'additive rhythms,' . . . 'Additive rhythms' are the analytic construction of the musicologist." Agawu states: "Additive rhythm . . . is a highly problematic concept for African music . . . it is not in sync with indigenous conceptions of musical structure. It arises as a kind of default grouping mechanism for those transcribers who either disregard the choreography or fail to accord it foundational status."

Tresillo is often interpreted as an additive rhythm because of the irregular grouping of its strokes: 3+3+2. However, tresillo is generated through cross-rhythm: 8 pulses ÷ 3 = 2 cross-beats (consisting of three pulses each), with a remainder of a partial cross-beat (spanning two pulses). In other words, 8 ÷ 3 = 2, r2. Tresillo is a cross-rhythmic fragment. It contains the first three cross-beats of the four-over-three cross-rhythm.

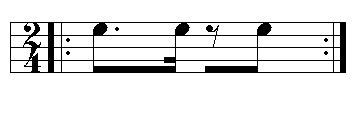
Tresillo written in divisive form: 8 ÷ 3.

Tresillo written in additive form: 3 + 3 + 2.

Although the difference between the two ways of notating this rhythm may seem small, they stem from fundamentally different conceptions. Those who wish to convey a sense of the rhythm’s background [main beats], and who understand the surface morphology in relation to a regular subsurface articulation, will prefer the divisive format. Those who imagine the addition of three, then three, then two sixteenth notes will treat the well-formedness of 3+3+2 as fortuitous, a product of grouping rather than of metrical structure. They will be tempted to deny that African music has a bona fide metrical structure because of its frequent departures from normative grouping structure—Agawu (2003: 87).

In divisive form, the strokes of tresillo contradict the beats. In additive form, the strokes of tresillo are the beats.

=== Counter-meter versus polymeter ===
A.M. Jones correctly identified the importance of this key pattern, but he mistook its accents as indicators of meter rather than the counter-metric (cross-rhythmic) phenomena they actually are. Similarly, while Anthony King identified this five-stroke figure as the ‘standard pattern’ in its simplest and most basic form, he did not correctly identify its metric structure. King represented the pattern in a polymetric 7/8 + 5/8 time signature.

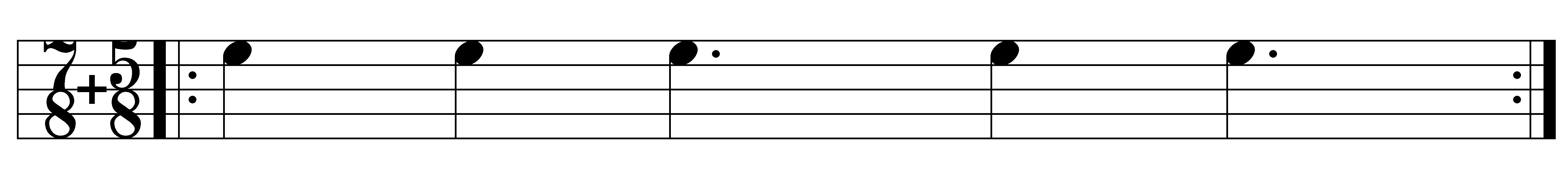
Anthony King's polymetric representation.

Because this triple-pulse pattern is generated from cross-rhythm, it is possible to count or feel it in several different ways, and divide by several different beat schemes. In the diagram below the five-stroke bell pattern is shown on top and a beat cycle is shown below it. Any or all of these structures may be the emphasis at a given point in a piece of music using the bell pattern.

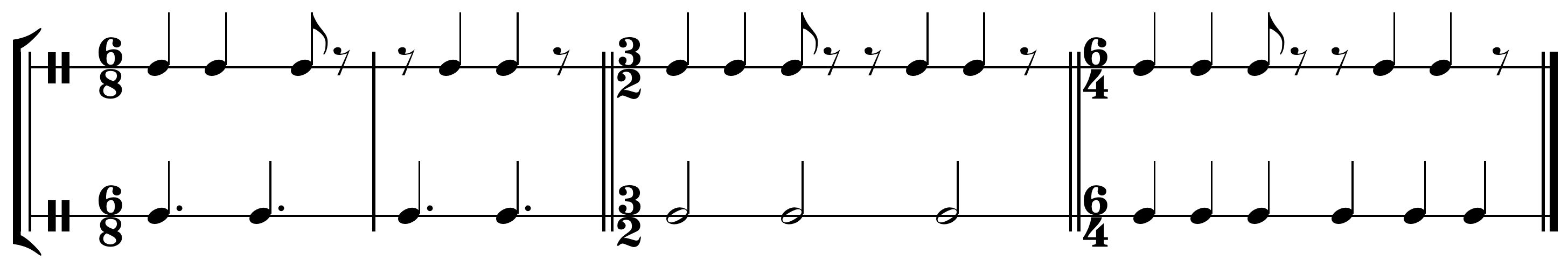
Different ways to count the five-stroke bell pattern, the first of which is correct.

The example on the left (6/8) represents the correct count and ground of the bell pattern. The four dotted quarter-notes across the two bottom measures are the main beats. All key patterns are built upon four main beats. The bottom measures on the other two examples (3/2 and 6/4) show cross-beats. Observing the dancer's steps almost always reveals the main beats of the music. Because the main beats are usually emphasized in the steps and not the music, it is often difficult for an "outsider" to feel the proper metric structure without seeing the dance component. Kubik states: "In order to understand the motional structure of any music in Africa, one has to look at the dancers as well and see how they relate to the instrumental background" (2010: 78).

For cultural insiders, identifying the . . . ‘dance feet’ occurs instinctively and spontaneously. Those not familiar with the choreographic supplement, however, sometimes have trouble locating the main beats and expressing them in movement. Hearing African music on recordings alone without prior grounding in its dance-based rhythms may not convey the choreographic supplement. Not surprisingly, many misinterpretations of African rhythm and meter stem from a failure to observe the dance—Agawu (2003).

== Afro-Cuban music ==
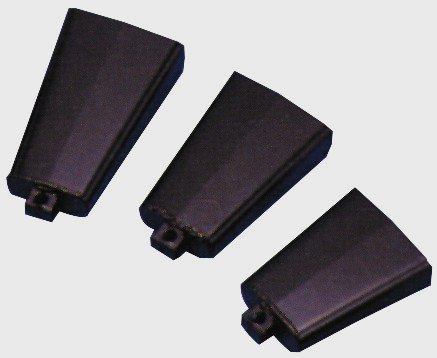
Cuban-style mountable cowbells.

=== Standard pattern ===
The method of constructing iron bells in Cuba is identical to how it is done in Africa. Not surprising, many African bell patterns are played in Cuba as well. The standard pattern is the most widely used bell pattern in Cuba. Some of the Afro-Cuban rhythms that use the standard pattern are: Congolese (Bantu): palo, triallo; Lucumí (Yoruba): iyesá (12/8 form), bembé, agbe; Arará (Fon/Ewe): sabalú, egbado; "Haitiano" (Fon/Ewe,Yoruba): vodú-radá, yanvalú, nagó; the rumba form columbia.

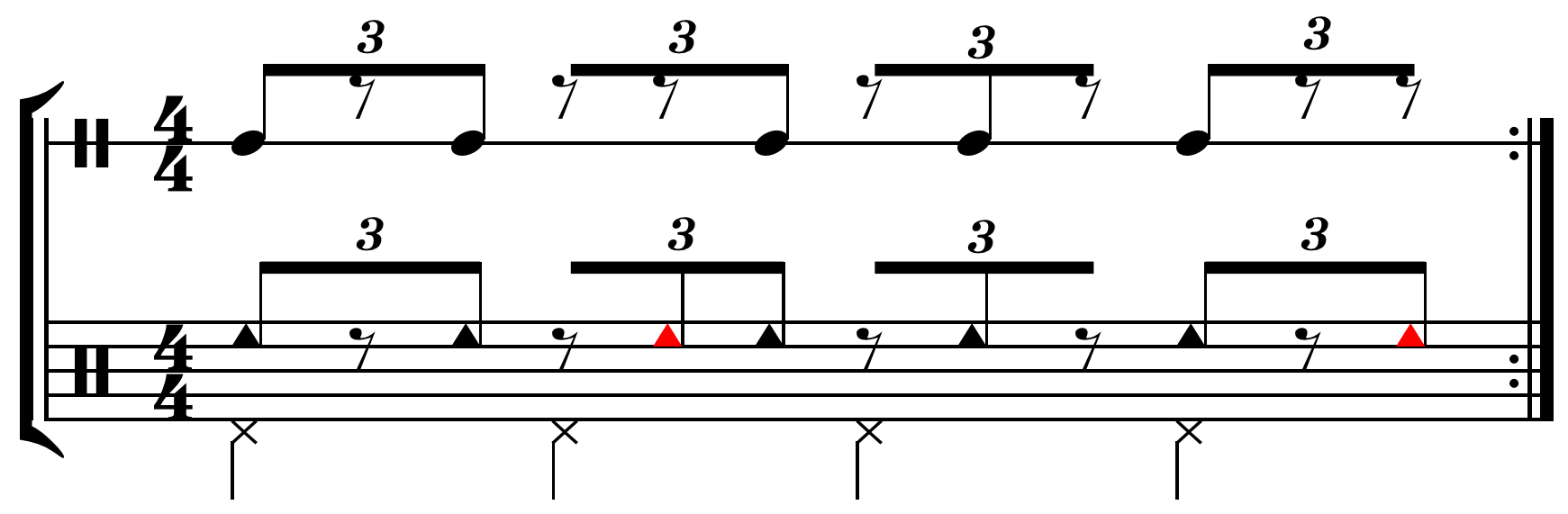
Triple-pulse rumba clave written as triplets in 4/4. Note that the standard bell pattern is the clave but with and pickups before the first and third notes, and the hi-hat marks the main beats (quarter-notes).

In the Yoruba-based, Afro-Cuban rhythms agbe (toque güiro) and bembé, standard pattern variations are used spontaneously.

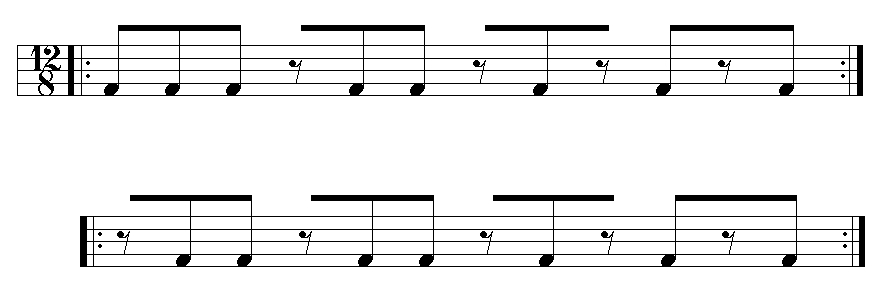
Standard bell pattern variations and

The following 24-pulse bell pattern is used in the arará rhythm afrekete. The first measure simply sounds the four main beats. Notice that the first five strokes of the second measure are identical to the first five strokes of the standard pattern.

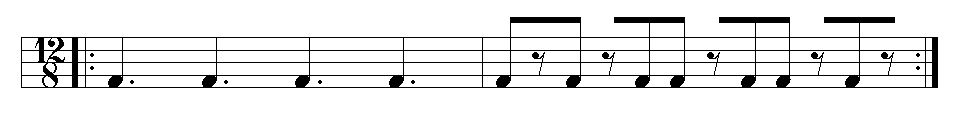
arará bell pattern

=== Three-beat cycle bell patterns ===
There are several 12/8 bell patterns based on "slow" cycles of three beats across four or eight main beats. The three-beat cycle is represented as half-notes in the following example for visual emphasis.

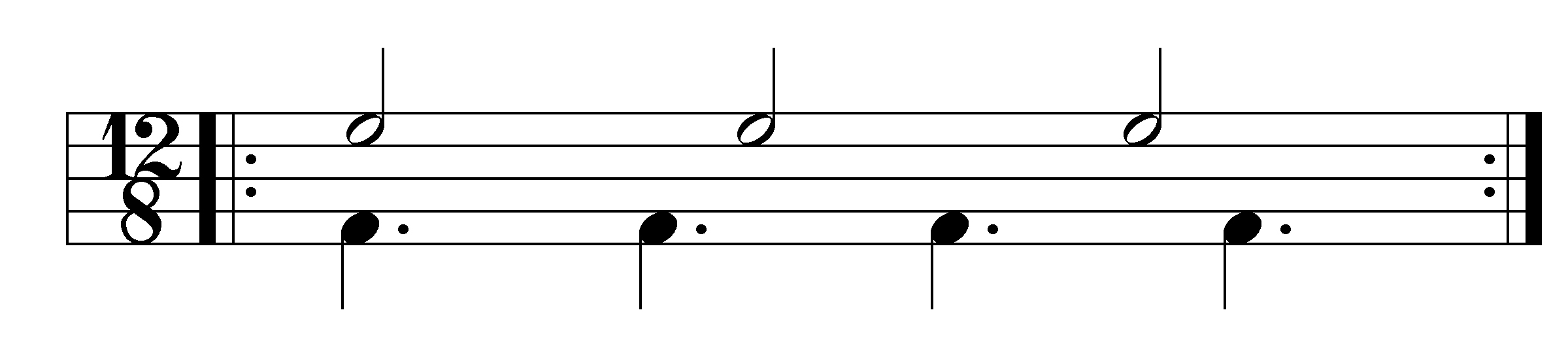
three-against-four cross-rhythm

This bell pattern, an embellishment of the three-beat cycle, is used in the Afro-Cuban rhythm abakuá. It consists of three sets of three strokes each.

The bell pattern is also played in a displaced position, beginning on 4a, the pulse immediately preceding beat 1.

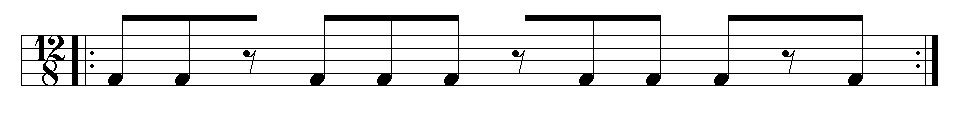
Abakuá bell pattern variant.

The following 24-pulse bell pattern is used in the arará rhythm afrekete. The Arará are Cuban descendants of the Fon/Ewe ethnic group, so it's perhaps not surprising that it is the same pattern as the bell part used in the Ewe rhythm kadodo, shown earlier in this article. However, as used in afrekete, the part begins in the second measure of 12/8. Notice that the first five strokes are identical to the first five strokes of the standard pattern. Like the kadodo bell, this pattern is an embellishment of the 3:8, or 1 1/2:4 cross-rhythm.

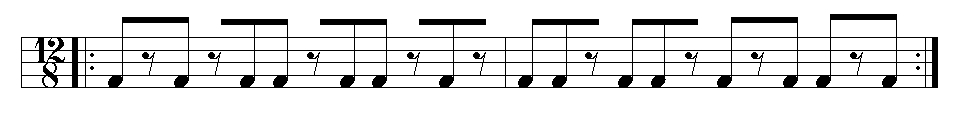
afrekete bell pattern

=== 4/4 Cuban bell patterns ===
A variety of Cuban 4/4 bell patterns have spread worldwide due to the global success of Cuban-based popular music.

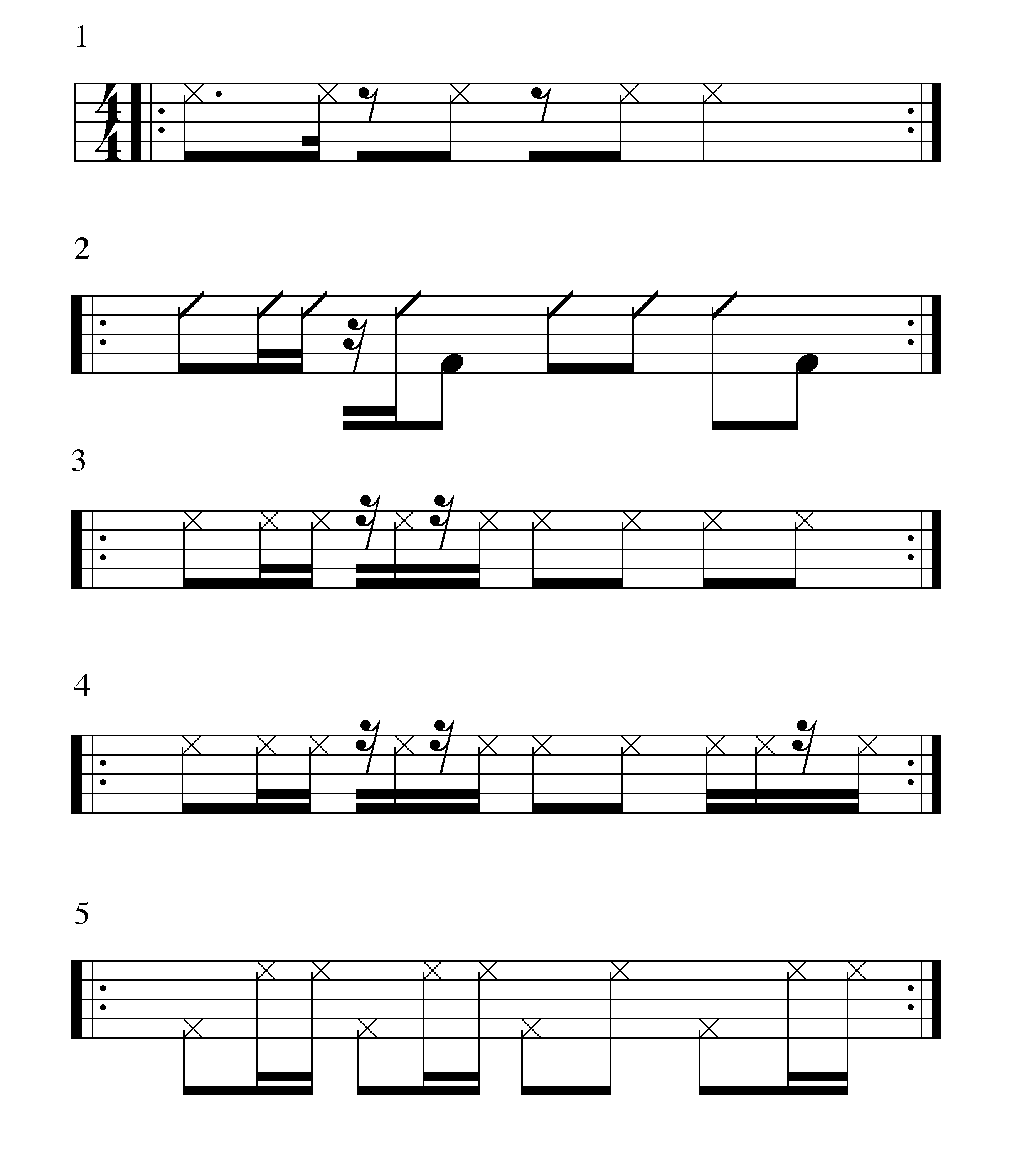
4/4 Afro-Cuban patterns., 2, 3, 4, 5

Pattern 1 is son clave, usually played on wooden claves. Pattern 2 is the baqueteo, the key pattern used in danzón and the first expression of clave in written music. The baqueteo consists of the son clave strokes, plus four additional strokes. Not technically a bell pattern, the baqueteo is played on the güiro and on the heads of the timbales. The slashed noteheads are muted tones and the regular noteheads are open tones.

In the 1940s the cowbell was added to the timbales in the first danzón-mambos of the charanga orchestras. Arcaño y sus Maravillas introduced this development. Later, multiple cowbells, a cymbal and the occasional woodblock were added to the timbale setup. Patterns 3 and 4 are guaguancó cáscara patterns adopted as mambo bell parts. During the mambo era of the 1940s, bongo players began regularly using a large hand-held cowbell during the montuno section in son groups. This bongo bell role was introduced in the son conjunto of Arsenio Rodríguez. Pattern 5 is the basic bongo bell pattern.

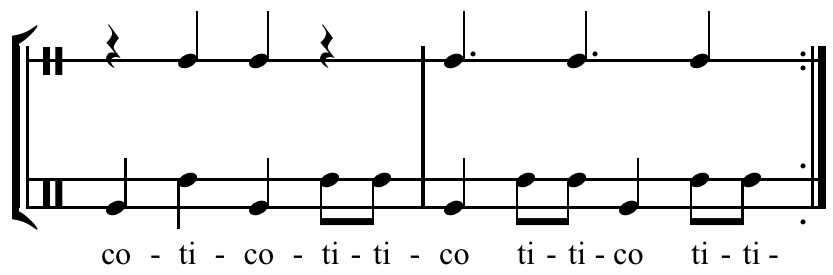
Cuban bongo bell pattern, with 2-3 son clave above..

The rhythmic basis for one of the most enduring Latin jazz tunes comes from a cáscara variant adopted as a mambo bell pattern. "Manteca," co-written by Dizzy Gillespie and Chano Pozo in 1947, is the first jazz standards to be rhythmically based on clave. The rhythm of the melody in the A section is identical to a common mambo bell pattern.

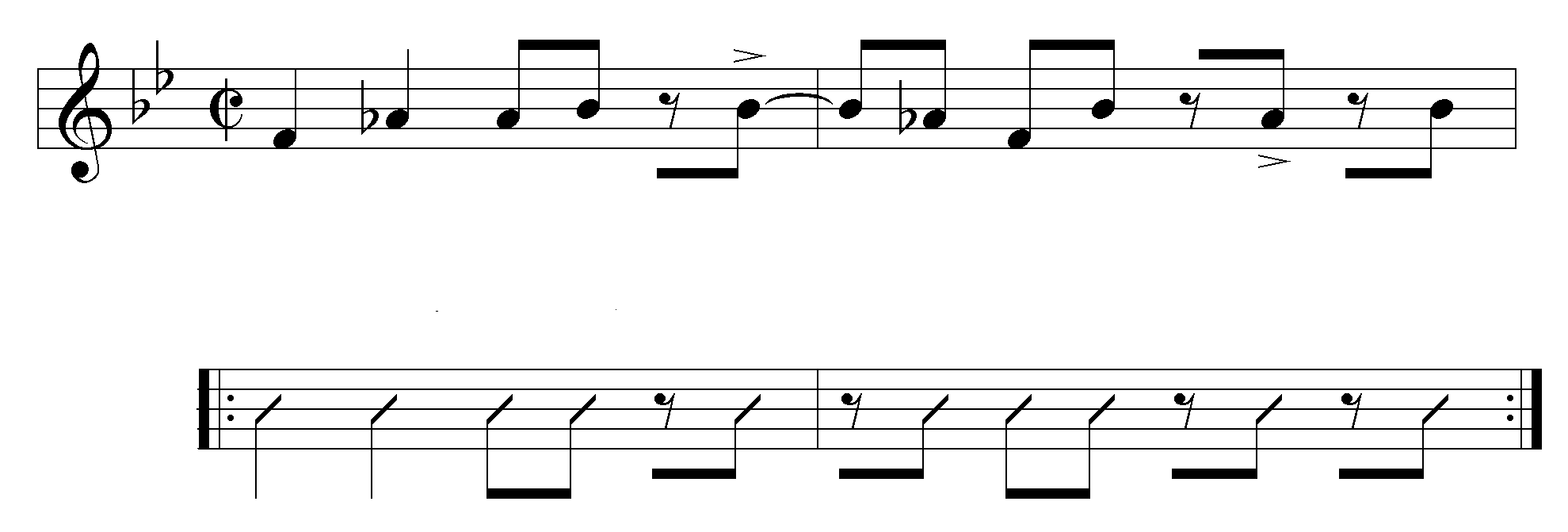
Top: opening measures of "Manteca" melody. Bottom: common mambo bell pattern (2-3 clave).

=== Timbale bell and bongo bell interplay ===
Patterns 3 and 4 are timbale bell parts that were introduced in mambo big bands. During the early 1940s Machito and his Afro-Cubans was the first band to employ the triumvirate of congas, bongos and timbales, the standard battery of percussion used in contemporary salsa. In the montuno section the bongo bell and the timbale bell parts are sounded simultaneously in a contrapuntal interplay.

In the 1970s José Luis Quintana "Changuito" developed the technique of simultaneously playing timbale and bongo bell parts when he held the timbales chair in the songo band Los Van Van. The example below shows the combined bell patterns (written in a 2-3 clave sequence).

Two interlocking cowbells, the "Changuito Special."

== Afro-Brazilian music ==
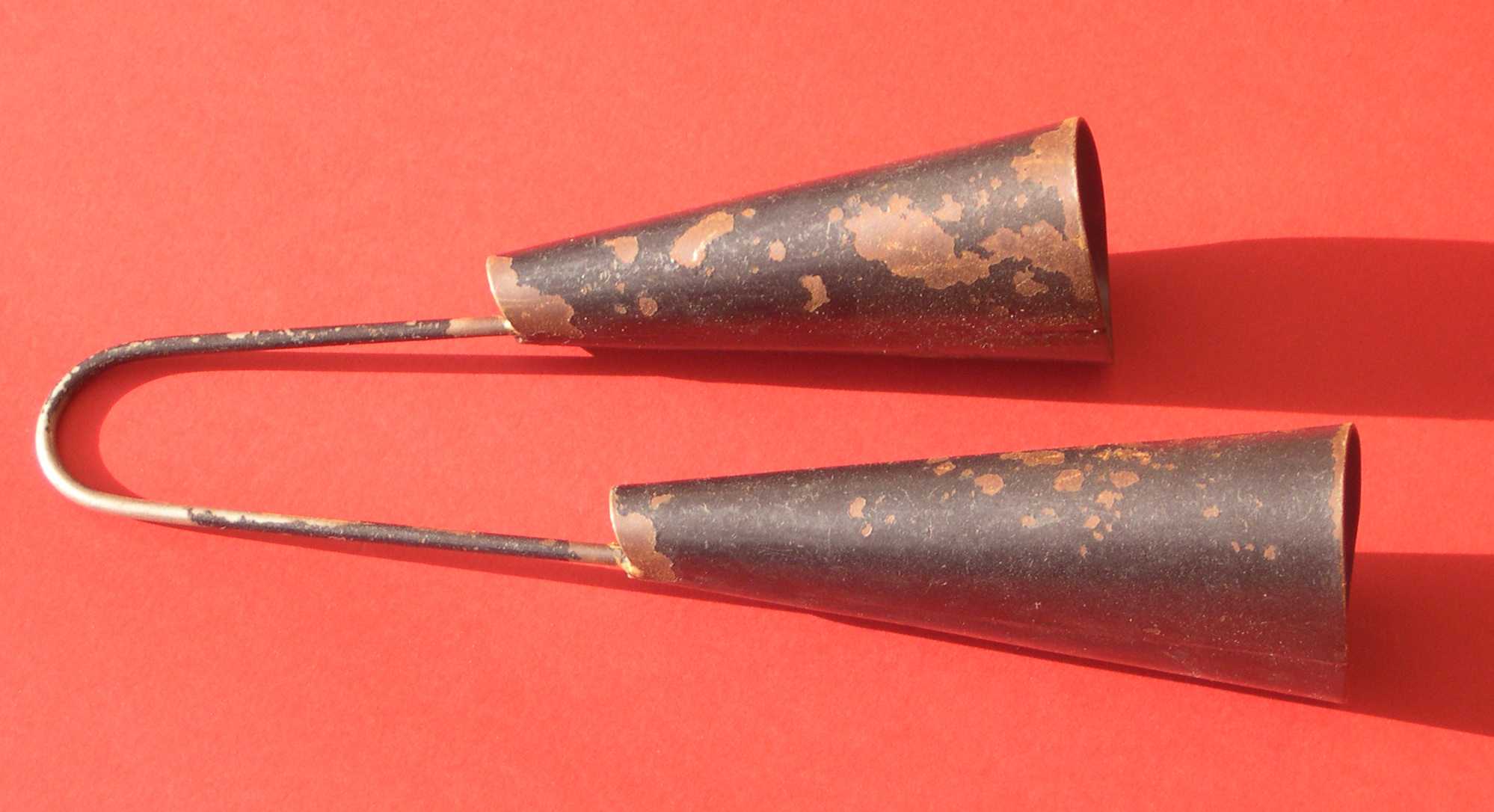
Brazilian agogo bell.

Afro-Brazilian music uses a variety of bell patterns, many of which are different than the patterns used in Cuba.

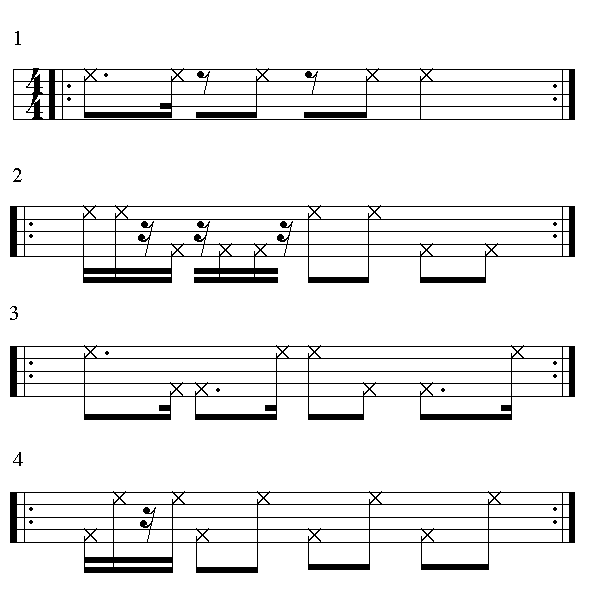
Afro-Brazilian bell patterns., 2, 3, 4

Bell pattern 1 is used in maculelê and some Candomblé and Macumba rhythms. Pattern 1 is known in Cuba as son clave. Bell 2 is used in afoxê and can be thought of as pattern 1 embellished with four additional strokes. Bell 3 is used in batucada. Pattern 4 is the maracatu bell and can be thought of as pattern 1 embellished with four additional strokes.

== See also ==
- Change ringing
