= Studies in African Music =

Book by A.M. Jones

- Author: A.M. Jones
- Language: English
- Subject: Ethnomusicology
- Genre: Non-fiction
- Publisher: Oxford University Press
- Publication date: 1959
- Publication place: Great Britain
- Media type: Print
- Pages: 295 (Volume I), 238 (Volume II)
- ISBN: 0-19-713512-9
- OCLC: 6977345

Studies in African Music is a 1959 book in two volumes by A.M. Jones. It is an in-depth analysis of the traditional music of the Ewe tribe.

== Summary ==
The work is divided into two volumes, with the first volume being an analysis of the music presented in Volume II, and the second being full-score reproductions of the pieces in question.

=== Volume I Contents ===
1. Introduction
2. Play-Songs and Fishing Songs
3. The Instruments of the Orchestra
4. The Nyayito Dance
5. Yeve Cult Music
6. Club Dances - The Adzida Dance
7. The Social Dance - Agbadza
8. A Comparison of Drumming
9. The Homogeneity of African Music
10. Tone and Tune
11. The Neo-Folk-Music

=== Volume II Contents ===
1. Play-Songs and Fishing Songs
2. The Nyayito Dance
3. Yeve Cult Music: (a) The Husago Dance, (b) The Sovu Dance, (c) The Sogba Dance
4. The Adzida Dance
5. The Agbadza Dance
6. The Icila Dance

== Influence ==
Steve Reich has listed this work as an influence on his music, particularly his "fooling around with tape loops, which [he] began to envision as little mechanized Africans [laughs]." It is also cited extensively in Volume I of Gunther Schuller's (who introduced Reich to the work) History of Jazz.
