= Arthur Morris Jones =

Arthur Morris Jones (1889–1980), was an English missionary and musicologist who worked in Zambia during the early 20th century.

Jones became a priest in 1923 and served as a curate in Kent before travelling to Northern Rhodesia (now Zambia) in 1929 with the Universities’ Mission to Central Africa.

He was stationed at St Mark's School in Mapanza, a community in the Southern Province of present-day Zambia (called Rhodesia at the time). He is best known for his ethnomusicological work, particularly his two-volume Studies in African Music. He made an important contribution to the literature with his work in African rhythmic structure.

In 1934 he introduced the technical term cross-rhythm: Formulae of movement, phrases or motifs are combined in that way, that their starting place, main accents and, or beat reference points "cross", that is, that they do not coincide.

In Studies in African Music he says that "African children love to turn any physical movement into song". In other words, he claims that rhythm comes from physical movement.

He is also remembered for his controversial theories on scales and the music of the xylophone, which he claimed migrated from Southeast Asia to Africa. Almost one hundred of Jones' acetate field recordings are part of the British Library Sound Archive (number C424).

== Bibliography ==
- Jones, A.M. Africa and Indonesia: The Evidence of the Xylophone and Other Musical and Cultural Factors. Leiden: Brill, 1964.
- Jones, A.M. "African Hymnody in Christian Worship." Gwelo: Mambo Press, 1976.
- Jones, A.M. African Music. Rhodes-Livingstone Museum Occasional Papers; No. 2. Livingstone, Northern Rhodesia: Rhodes-Livingstone Institute, 1943.
- Jones, A.M. African Rhythm. London: International African Institute, 1954.
- Jones, A.M. Studies in African Music. 2 vols. London: New York, 1978.
- Jones, A.M., and L. Kombe. The Icila Dance, Old Style. A Study in African Music and Dance of the Lala Tribe of Northern Rhodesia. Roodepoort, South Africa: Published by Longmans, Green and Co. for African Music Society, 1952.

== See also ==
- Klaus Wachsmann
