= Groove (drumming) =

In drumming, a groove is a repeated phrase that sets and maintains the rhythm and tempo of the piece.

Grooves and fills are the main components of the music played on a drum kit, and together with basic techniques or rudiments such as flams make up the curriculum for learning to play the drum kit.

To a drummer, a groove is the drumming equivalent of a riff to a guitarist.

== Examples ==
=== Traditional ===
==== Africa ====
- Bell pattern
- Cross-rhythm
- Djembe rhythms

==== Asia ====
- Dumbek
- iqa'
- Tala

==== Europe ====
- Jig
- March
- Polka
- Waltz
- Asymmetric or compound meter
- Flamenco Palos

==== Latin America ====
- Bossa Nova
- Cha-cha
- Dembow
- Merengue
- Samba
- Son Clave
- Tresillo

=== Contemporary ===
==== Jazz music ====
- Shuffle
- Swing

==== Rock music ====
- Cut time
- Four on the floor
- Two-step
- Rosanna shuffle

==== Heavy metal music ====
- Blast beat
- Breakdown
- Double bass drum pattern

== See also ==
- Groove (music)
