= Barney's Favorites, Volume 1 =

Studio album by Barney
- Released: August 31, 1993
- Recorded: October 15, 1991–1993
- Studios: Singleton Productions, Inc.
- Genre: Children's
- Length: 40:25
- Label: SBK
- Producers: Dennis DeShazer (exec.); Sheryl Leach (exec.); Allen LeWinter; Bob Singleton

Barney chronology
Barney's Favorites, Volume 1 (1993)	Barney's Favorites, Volume 2 (1994)

Barney's Favorites, Volume 1 is the debut studio album by the American children's television show Barney. It was released by SBK Records on August 31, 1993.

== Critical reception ==
Professional ratings
Review scores
Source	Rating
AllMusic	4.5/5 stars

Stephen Thomas Erlewine of AllMusic said that both volumes in Barney's Favorites, much like the television series, are "cute and sweet". He stated that the album "provides hours of listening enjoyment for small children, although parents might find it a little tiring".

== Awards and nominations ==
Barney's Favorites, Volume 1 received a nomination for Best Musical Album for Children at the 36th Annual Grammy Awards in 1994, in which the nomination would go to the album producer, Bob Singleton.

== Track listing ==
Barney's Favorites, Volume 1 track listing
No.	Title	Length
1.	"Barney Theme Song"	0:57
2.	"My Family's Just Right for Me"	2:18
3.	"Peanut Butter"	1:26
4.	"The Ants Go Marching"	2:24
5.	"Apples and Bananas"	1:44
6.	"A Camping We Will Go"	0:49
7.	"Sarasponda"	0:44
8.	"Clean Up"	0:31
9.	"If All the Raindrops"	1:23
10.	"And the Green Grass Grows All Around"	2:23
11.	"Sally the Camel"	1:49
12.	"BINGO"	1:26
13.	"Six Little Ducks"	1:19
14.	"Do Your Ears Hang Low?"	1:13
15.	"Looby Loo"	1:34
16.	"Down on Grandpa's Farm"	2:29
17.	"The Stranger Song"	1:32
18.	"Old Brass Wagon"	1:07
19.	"Hurry, Hurry, Drive the Firetruck"	1:20
20.	"There Are Seven Days"	0:56
21.	"Alphabet Song"	1:03
22.	"Mr. Knickerbocker"	1:13
23.	"Kookaburra"	1:15
24.	"Itsy Bitsy Spider"	1:00
25.	"Me and My Teddy"	2:08
26.	"The Sister Song"	1:56
27.	"I Love You"	1:03
Total length:		40:25

== Charts ==
Chart performance for Barney's Favorites, Volume 1
Chart (1993–1996)	Peak position
US Billboard 200	9
US Top Catalog Albums (Billboard)	34
US Kid Albums (Billboard)	1
US Top 100 Pop Albums (Cash Box)	38

== Certifications ==
Certifications for Barney's Favorites, Volume 1
Region	Certification	Certified units/sales
Canada (Music Canada)	Platinum	100,000^{^}
United States (RIAA)	3× Platinum	3,000,000^{^}
^{^} Shipments figures based on certification alone.
