= Drum beat =

Rhythmic pattern played on drums

A drum beat or drum pattern is a rhythmic pattern, or repeated rhythm establishing the meter and groove through the pulse and subdivision, played on drum kits and other percussion instruments. As such a "beat" consists of multiple drum strokes occurring over multiple musical beats while the term "drum beat" may also refer to a single drum stroke which may occupy more or less time than the current pulse. Many drum beats define or are characteristic of specific music genres.

Many basic drum beats establish the pulse through alternating bass (on the on-beats) and snare drums (on the off-beats) strokes while establishing the subdivision on the ride cymbal (thus its name) or hi-hat:

Simple quadruple drum pattern, "Straight blues/Rock groove": divides each of two beats into two.

This establishes a quarter note pulse in (quad)duple time: each measure is formed from (two groups of) two quarter note pulses, each pulse divided into two eighth notes.

Simple triple drum pattern: divides each of three beats into two.

This establishes a quarter note pulse in triple time: each measure is formed from three quarter note pulses, each divided into two eighth notes.

Compound [quadr]duple drum pattern: divides each of two beats into three.

This establishes a dotted-quarter note pulse in duple time: each measure is formed from two dotted-quarter note pulses, each pulse divided into three eighth notes.

Simple duple drum pattern but with triplets: divides each of two beats into three.

Compound triple meter is equivalent to simple duple meter with triplets on every beat.

Compound triple drum pattern: divides each of three beats into three

This establishes a dotted-quarter note pulse in triple time: each measure is formed from three dotted-quarter note pulses, each pulse divided into three eighth notes.

A "fill" is played in between the regular strokes of a pattern and/or signals the end of a phrase:

Sixteenth note fill in a rock/popular groove played on a drum kit.

Since a phrase is multiple measures long, a fill signaling the end of one would come at the end of the last in a series of repeated measures.

In double and half-time patterns the pulse and ride are either doubled or halved, respectively, occurring twice or half as often:

Double-time: the snare moves to the "&" beats while the hi-hat begins to subdivide sixteenth notes. Also, the eighth notes 'sound like' quarter notes in two tiny measures.
Half time: the snare moves to beats 3 of measure one and two (beats 3 & 7) while the hi-hat plays only on the quarter notes. Also, the quarter notes 'sound like' eighth notes in one giant measure.

A blast beat drum pattern features all drums on the eighth note subdivision or variants with one or more drum's pattern displaced by a sixteenth note:

Blast beat drum pattern
Blast beat drum pattern

This resembles a combination of double-time (bass-snare pattern) and original time (ride pattern).

Delayed backbeat (last eighth note in each measure) as in funk music

Despite the difference in notation, there is no difference in interonset intervals and this pattern is nearly identical to the first simple duple pattern except for the second onbeat being divided into two eighth notes and the second backbeat being delayed an eighth note.

The heavy metal gallop, named for a horse's canter, is based on a bass drum pattern of one eighth followed by two sixteenths.

This resembles a combination of double-time (bass-snare pattern) and original time (ride pattern).

Heavy metal gallop drum pattern

== See also ==
- Break (music)
- Drum cadence
- Ghost note
- Rhythm section
- Riddim
- Rosanna shuffle
- Purdie shuffle
- Bo Diddley beat
