= Three Little Fishies =

Song by Kay Kyser and His Band (original)
- Published: 1939
- Genre: children's song, novelty song, Pop standard
- Label: Columbia Records
- Composer: Saxie Dowell
- Lyricists: Josephine Carringer, Bernice Idins

Official audio
- "Three Little Fishies" on YouTube

"Three Little Fishies", also known as "Three Little Fishes", is a 1939 song with words by Josephine Carringer and Bernice Idins and music by Saxie Dowell. The song tells the story of three fishes, who defy their mother's command of swimming only in a meadow, by swimming over a dam and on out to sea, where they encounter a shark, which the fish describe as a whale. They flee for their lives and return to the meadow in safety.

The song was a US No. 1 hit for Kay Kyser and his band in 1939. It was released in the UK as a 78 by British comedian Frankie Howerd, on the short-lived UK Harmony label, in 1949. It was revived in 2012 by Ray Stevens for inclusion in his 108-song box set, The Encyclopedia of Recorded Comedy Music.

== Other recordings and all releases of the original song ==
- A recording by Hal Kemp and His Orchestra, with vocals by The Smoothies, was made in March, 1939, about a month before the Kay Kyser recording.
- The song as sung by Kay Kyser and accompanied by his band, released in 1939. It was a US No. 1 hit.
- A recording was made in 1939 by Nat Gonella and The Georgians. It features in the compilation Children's Wartime Favourites, issued in 2005 by River Records.
- Billy Costello recorded his own hilarious version of the recording in June, 1939.
- 1949 the original version by Kay Kyser was released in the UK as a 78 by British comedian Frankie Howerd, on the short-lived UK Harmony label.
- On February 11, 1953 Spike Jones and His City Slickers recorded a version of the song featuring the 34 year old George Rock (who was renowned for his ability to sing with a falsetto voice) imitating the high voice of a very cute little girl. This version bears the alternative title Itty Bitty Poo.
- In 1961, Buzz Clifford released a version of the song as a single which reached #102 on the Billboard pop chart.
- In 1963, The Andrews Sisters recorded it on their Dot Records album “Greatest Hits Volume 2”, although they never recorded it prior to this album.
- There is a version on the 1963 Homer and Jethro album Zany Songs of the 30s.
- Ray Walston and the Do Re Mi Children's Chorus recorded a version of the song in 1965.
- In 1966 Jon Pertwee contributed the song to the children's album Children's Favourites by EMI and Paul Hamlyn.
- A portion of the song was used by Mitch Ryder and The Detroit Wheels, in 1966, as part of their version of The Marvelettes' "Too Many Fish in the Sea".
- During her 1969 appearance on the Here's Lucy episode “Lucy and the Andrews Sisters”, Patty Andrews sings this song during a medley of Andrews Sisters hits.
- The 1973 made-for-television movie Birds of Prey features the original version of the song at its introduction, being sung along to by protagonist David Janssen while flying a Hughes 500 helicopter for a fictional Salt Lake City radio station. Later incarnations of the film, on formats such as VHS and DVD, have the song omitted and substituted by another big band song of indeterminable title.
- 1980: In the Star Wars episode of The Muppet Show, the song is sung by a Muppet eel, performed by Jerry Nelson, with Muppet fishes and a shark.
- In a 1981 episode of Three's Company, a misunderstanding occurs when Jack and Janet overhear a psychiatrist, played by Jeffrey Tambor, repeatedly saying "boom, boom, dittum dattem..." while trying to remember the words to this song, to help him get through to a patient. Jack and Janet mistake him for the mental patient and fear for Terri's safety on their date.
- On Wednesday 24th February 1982 BBC1's Children's TV Show 'Play School' covered this song, with Stuart McGugan (from 'It Ain't Half Hot Mum' fame) providing the lyrics and puppetry.
- In "Force of Habit", the 15th episode of the 1982-1983 television show Tales of the Gold Monkey, the main character, an ex-Flying Tiger named Jake Cutter, played by Stephen Collins, sings the song in the middle of a storm to keep up morale in his plane.
- Canadian children's singers Sharon Lois and Bram recorded the song for their 1984 LP "Mainly Mother Goose"
- Australian singer Don Spencer, a regular on both the BBC version and the ABC version of Play School, included the song in his 1984 album Don Spencer from Play School Sings 21 Childrens' Favourites.
- BBC 2 Children's stalwart TV show 'Play Away', from Saturday, 21st January, 1984, covered the song with Floella Benjamin singing the lead. With Brian Cant, Linda Williams and Matthew Devitt on back-up.
- In two episodes of Barney & Friends, A Splash Party Please from 1992 and Look at me, I'm 3! from 1993, the children perform the song with Barney and Baby Bop.
- It has also been recorded in other languages, including Dutch and Norwegian (as "Har du hørt historien om de tre små fisk").
- The Kidsongs version (Play Along Songs; 1993) omits the third verse, whereas the Disney Sing Along Songs version (Mickey's Fun Songs: Beach Party at Walt Disney World; 1995) omits the second verse.
- In 2005 the recording of 1939 by Nat Gonella and The Georgians features in the compilation Children's Wartime Favourites, issued by River Records.
- In 2012 the original version by Kay Kyser was revived by Ray Stevens for inclusion in his 108-song box set, The Encyclopedia of Recorded Comedy Music.
- The American 'YouTube' channel Cocomelon Season 5 Episode 1, released 2023, features the melody of the song although the lyrics are changed to, "Down In The Jungle."

== See also ==
- Nonsense song
