= 6/4 =

6/4 or 6-4 may refer to:

- June 4, a day of the year in month-day date notation
  - 1989 Tiananmen Square protests and massacre, also referred to the June Fourth Incident (Chinese: 六四事件)
- 6 April, a day of the year in day-month date notation
- 6/4, a time signature comparable to 6/8 or 3/4 time
- State Highway 6–4 (Cuba), highway in Granma Province, Cuba
