= Nonsense song =

Type of song

A nonsense song is one written mainly for the purpose of entertainment using nonsense syllables at least in the chorus. Such a song generally has a simple melody and a quick (or fairly quick) tempo and repeating sections.

== History ==
The roots of this song type can be traced as far back as "Shoo, Fly, Don't Bother Me" and "Jimmy Crack Corn" to the 1890s "Ta-ra-ra Boom-de-ay".

The Jazz Age created many nonsense songs, such as "Ja-Da".

Ja-da, ja-da
Ja-da, ja-da, jing, jing, jing

== Examples ==
- "Sarasponda", a children's folk song
- "Nonsense Song (Titine)" a song written by Charlie Chaplin, used in Modern Times (1936)
- "Hold Tight (Want Some Seafood Mama)", written by Edward Robinson; Jerry Brandow; Lenny Kent; Leonard Ware; Willie Spottswood in 1938
- "Three Little Fishies", written by Josephine Carringer and Bernice Idins; with music by Saxie Dowell in 1939
- "Mairzy Doats", composed by Milton Drake, Al Hoffman and Jerry Livingston in 1943
- "Bibbidi-Bobbidi-Boo", written by Al Hoffman, Mack David and Jerry Livingston in 1948
- "Hi-Lili, Hi-Lo", written by Helen Deutsch in 1952
- "Rubber Biscuit", written by Charles Johnson and first recorded by The Chips in 1956; later known from the Blues Brothers cover version.
- "Surfin' Bird", written by Al Frazier, Carl White, Sonny Harris and Turner Wilson Jr. in 1963. Performed by The Trashmen and the Ramones.
- "Chim Chim Cher-ee", written by the Sherman Brothers in 1964
- "The Name Game", written by Shirley Ellis in 1964
- "Chitty Chitty Bang Bang", written by the Sherman Brothers in 1968
- "I Am the Walrus", written by John Lennon in 1967
- "Ob-La-Di, Ob-La-Da", written by Paul McCartney in 1968
- "Dig a Pony", written by John Lennon in 1969
- "Bip Bop", written by McCartney for Wings in 1970.
- "Prisencolinensinainciusol", written by Adriano Celentano in 1972
- The Israeli rock band Kaveret, active 1973–1976, are known with their songs with nonsense, wordplays and surrealistic stories.
- "Hubba Hubba Zoot Zoot", by novelty band Caramba, released in 1981 on the self-titled album. Other songs on the album are also of the same nonsense song genre.
- The closing theme song of the 1970s-80s sitcom WKRP in Cincinnati by Jim Ellis features gibberish lyrics.
- "Monster In The Mirror" from Sesame Street (1989)
- "The Gibberish Song" from Judy and David's Boombox (1999/2000)
- "Gibberish", from the 2003 Relient K album Two Lefts Don't Make a Right...but Three Do
- "Chacarron Macarron", written by "El Chombo" in 2006
- "Why This Kolaveri Di", an Indian song from 2011 by actor Dhanush.
- "Ja Ja Ding Dong", a song from the 2020 film Eurovision Song Contest: The Story of Fire Saga
- "Igowallah", written by Daniel Thrasher in 2023
- "The Ketchup Song (Aserejé)", written by Las Ketchup in 2002 has a nonsensical chorus that hides as Spanish to non-native speakers.
- The entire soundtrack of the Splatoon series of video games is in the fictional languages of the Inklings and Octarians, and thus is completely unintelligible.

== See also ==
- Denpa song
- Literary nonsense
- Novelty song
