= The Georgians =

The Georgians may refer to:

- The Georgians (American band), a jazz and dance group formed in 1921 under Frank Guarente
- The Georgians (British band), a jazz band founded in 1934 by Nat Gonella
- The Georgians, a 1904 book by William Harben

== See also ==
- Georgians, a nation and ethnic group who constitute a majority of the population in Georgia
