= Playmates (song) =

Single by Kay Kyser and His Orchestra with Sully Mason and His Playmates
- Released: 1940
- Genre: Children's music; traditional pop
- Label: Columbia
- Composer: Charles L. Johnson
- Lyricist: Saxie Dowell

"Playmates" is a popular song ostensibly written by Saxie Dowell. The main theme was note-for-note plagiarized from the 1904 intermezzo "Iola" by Charles L. Johnson, for which Johnson sued, settling out of court for an undisclosed sum.

Recordings in 1940 were made by Kay Kyser and his orchestra (vocals: Sully Mason & His Playmates), by Mitchell Ayres and His Fashions In Music (vocals: Mary Ann Mercer & Tommy Taylor), and by Hal Kemp and the Smoothies. The Johnny McGee orchestra also recorded it in February 1940 with the vocal by Harry Garret (actually Harry Garey) and Carol Anderson. Harry's name was misspelled on the Varsity label.

The Kay Kyser recording was released by Columbia Records as catalog number 35375. The record first reached the Billboard magazine charts on July 20, 1940 (the first week that Billboard listed a chart) and lasted one week on the chart, peaking at number four.

The song was revived in a 1953 recording by Jimmy Boyd, and then again in a 1955 recording by the Fontane Sisters. The recording was released by Dot Records as catalog number 15370. The song was on the Cash Box magazine chart for three weeks, peaking at number 37.

The Kipper Kids performed a version of the song, used in The Addams Family (1991 film) in the scene in which Gomez and Fester slide down to the family vault.
