= Sarasponda =

Children's nonsense song

"Sarasponda" is a children's nonsense song that has been considered a popular campfire song. It is often described to be a spinning song, that is, a song that would be sung while spinning at the spinning wheel. It is frequently described as being of Dutch origin, and there is a bit of folklore that says Dutch mothers used it to teach their daughters to spin with the particular aim of finding a good husband. This origin is hard to verify, however. The earliest known printed versions may be American collections from the 1940s. It is contained in the pocket songbook Sing It Again, published in 1944 by the Cooperative Recreation Service, and in Sing for the Fun of It, published by the Florida Methodist Youth Fellowship in the same decade.

The words are sometimes said to be onomatopoeic, made up from the sound of the spinning wheel, “sarasponda, sarasponda, sarasponda", and then the sound of the foot pedal brake slowing down the wheel; "ret, set, set.” This interpretation, however, is questionable, due to the fact that spinning wheels don't have a "foot pedal brake", or any other brake.

== Lyrics ==
One version of the lyrics, for two groups of singers, is

Group 1:

boom-da, boom-da, boom-da (repeated to chorus)

Group 2:

Sarasponda, sarasponda, sarasponda ret set set
Sarasponda, sarasponda, sarasponda ret set set

All (chorus):

Ah do ray oh, ah do ray boomday oh
Ah do ray boomday ret set set
Ah say pa say oh.
Refrain starting at Group 2
