= Apples and Bananas =

Children's song

Song

from the album One Light, One Sun
- Released: 1985
- Genre: Children's
- Songwriter: Traditional

"Apples and Bananas" or "Oopples and Boo-noo-noos" is a traditional North American children's song that plays with the vowels of words. The first verse usually begins unaltered:

I like to eat, eat, eat apples and bananas.
I like to eat, eat, eat apples and bananas.

The following verses replace most or all vowels with one given vowel sound (the letters A, E, I, O, and U, except for "Y" (which is sometimes a vowel or consonant). It is usually each of the long vowels sounds of ⟨a⟩ (/eɪ/), ⟨e⟩ (/iː/), ⟨i⟩ (/aɪ/), ⟨o⟩ (/oʊ/), and ⟨u⟩ (/uː/), although potentially any English vowel can be used. For example:

Ay lake tay ate, ate, ate ayples aind bah-nay-nays.
Ay lake tay ate, ate, ate ayples aind bah-nay-nays.

/eɪ leɪk teɪ eɪt eɪt eɪt ˈeɪpəlz eɪnd bəˈneɪneɪz/
/eɪ leɪk teɪ eɪt eɪt eɪt ˈeɪpəlz eɪnd bəˈneɪneɪz/

Scottish musicians Cilla Fisher & Artie Trezise included the song on their 1982 album and book The Singing Kettle.

Canadian musician Raffi released a version of the song on his album One Light, One Sun (1985). This version only changed the stressed vowels; that is, the vowels in "eat", "apples", and the last two syllables of "bananas". The song was described as one of several "old favourites" performed by Sandra Beech from her 1982 album Inch by Inch in 1984 in the Ottawa Citizen.

The song was also sung on three early episodes of the children's television program Barney & Friends, as well as on Rock with Barney, the final video in the predecessor series Barney & the Backyard Gang. As with Raffi, Barney's version also only changed the stressed vowels. The Wiggles sang a version of the song on their 2014 album, and it became one of their most popular songs.

Sesame Street released an animated version in 2019 featuring Elmo, Abby Cadabby, and Grover singing the song.

== See also ==
- "Drei Chinesen mit dem Kontrabass"
- "Oranges and Lemons"
