= Takadimi =

System for teaching rhythm skills

Takadimi is a system devised by Richard Hoffman, William Pelto, and John W. White in 1996 in order to teach rhythm skills. Takadimi, while utilizing rhythmic symbols borrowed from classical Hindustani and Carnatic music, differentiates itself from this method by focusing the syllables on meter and western tonal rhythm. Takadimi is based on the use of specific syllables at certain places within a beat. Takadimi is used in classrooms from elementary level up through the collegiate level. It meets National Content Standard 5 by teaching both reading and notating music.

== Development ==
Takadimi is similar to the Kodály method, developed in 1935 in Hungary. Both systems can be traced back to the 19th century French Time-Names system. Hoffman, Pelto, and White developed the system with certain goals in mind. As stated by the developers themselves:

1. It should lead to accuracy and musicality in performance, both studies, and sight-read, including the ability to recognize and perform the musical gesture.
2. It should require and reflect an understanding of rhythmic structure, recognition of metric and rhythmic interaction, and awareness of the precise contextual location of beats and attack points.
3. It should facilitate aural recognition and identification of rhythmic patterns and metric divisions.
4. It should provide a precise and consistent language for the discussion of temporal phenomena. There should be no need to create new terms or separate categories for performance, transcription, or analytical work.
5. It should address rhythmic issues presented by music outside the realm of traditional tonal literature such as asymmetric meters, modulation of meter or tempo, complex syncopations, complex tuplet groupings, and passages that combine these in a novel and challenging ways.
6. Like pitch solfège, it should be a system that is easily applied and adapts to broad applications, and it should be a tool for lifelong use.

Hoffman, Pelto, and White believe that they took the best from many existing systems and tweaked them together to form this system that best meets the goals they set for themselves. Of the systems they used as either inspiration or examples of unwanted attributes, three are mentioned in the journal where they first proposed their system in 1996: The Kodály Method, the McHose/Tibbs system, and Edwin Gordon's system.

== How it works ==
The Takadimi system teaches students to read rhythm in a way similar to the way a language would be taught, rooted in Pestalozzian theory formalized by Robert M. Gagné and applied in Edwin Gordon's skill learning sequences. Students learn first to recognize and repeat rhythms before they learn to associate those rhythms with standard musical notation and begin reading and writing music. The system has a basis of two related sets of syllables, one for simple meter and one for compound meter. In both meters, syllables are assigned to certain positions within the beat as opposed to the syllables being assigned to certain notational values. This allows for rhythms that sound the same to be pronounced the same, even when the notation differs. Such notational differences commonly result in rhythms that sound the same often occurring between 2/4 and 2/2 time signatures. Also, each subdivision has unique syllables, so a note in a certain place within the beat always has the same syllable.

=== Simple meter ===
In simple meter, the attack on the beat is called ‘ta,’ and an attack on the second half of the beat is always called ‘di.’ When the beat is divided further into fourths, the pronunciation of each fourth would be ‘ta ka di mi.’

=== Compound meter ===
In compound meter, as in simple meter, the attack on the beat is called ‘ta.’ The first division into thirds is pronounced ‘ta ki da.’ The subdivision into sixths is pronounced ‘ta va ki di da ma.’

=== Both meters ===
In both meters, ‘ta’ always begins a beat and ‘di’ always marks the middle of the beat, simplifying switching between the two. Also, in order to allow the system to expand to more unusual time signatures, a syllable ‘ti’ may be added to the end of the subdivision. A quintuplet in simple meter, for example, would be pronounced ‘ta ka di mi ti’, and a septuplet in compound meter would be pronounced ‘ta va ki di da ma ti’.

== Comparison to other systems ==
=== Kodály Method ===
The Kodály method, a system developed by Hungarian composer Zoltán Kodály, differs from Takadimi in that it ascribes syllables to specific notational values, regardless of their placement within the beat. Sets of syllables are also assigned to specific rhythmic patterns. For example, an eighth note is called ‘ti’ whether it is on the attack of the beat or in the middle, and regardless of the meter. This method was intended for use at the elementary level, and critics say that it is not expandable to upper level classrooms. Philip Tacka and Michael Houlahan, who studied the Kodály method at Millersville University, have stated that “the Takadimi rhythm system solves the problems associated with the Kodály rhythm syllables. We believe that were Kodály alive today, he would certainly encourage his students and colleagues to use the Takadimi system.” Lois Chosky proposed modifications to the Kodály method, providing further subdivisions of syllables, in the 1981 book The Kodály Context: Creating an Environment for Musical Learning.

=== McHose/Tibbs ===
Allen McHose and Ruth Tibbs developed a system that is based on counting within the measure. For example, ‘one’ is said on the attack of beat one, ‘two’ is said on the attack of beat two and so on. This system also ascribes syllables to certain notational values, but the syllables are not unique to certain attack points as in the Takadimi system. Hoffman believes that this system requires a formal understanding of musical notation before it can become useful.

=== Edwin Gordon ===
Edwin Gordon has developed a system similar to the McHose/Tibbs system above. It is similar in that it also assigns syllables based on beat orientation. However, these syllables are meter-dependent. For example, 3 eighth notes in 6/8 are pronounced ‘du-da-di’ whereas in 7/8 they are pronounced ‘du-ba-bi.’
