= Sextuple metre =

Musical metre

Sextuple metre (Am. meter) or sextuple time (chiefly British) is a musical metre characterized by six beats in a measure. Like the more common duple, triple, and quadruple metres, it may be simple, with each beat divided in half, or compound, with each beat divided into thirds. The most common time signatures for simple sextuple metre are 6/4 and 6/8, and compound sextuple metre is most often written in 18/8 or 18/16. A time signature of 18/8 or 18/16, however, does not necessarily mean that the bar is a sextuple metre with each beat divided into three. It may, for example, be used to indicate a bar of triple metre in which each beat is subdivided into six parts. In this case, the metre is sometimes characterized as "triple sextuple time". Such a division of time may be encountered more frequently in the Baroque period: for example, variation 26 of the Goldberg Variations by Johann Sebastian Bach has 18/16 in one hand against 3/4 in the other, exchanging hands at intervals until the last five bars where both hands are in 18/16. Using 3/4 for both hands would result in continuous sextuplets.

Sextuple metre should not be confused with the similarly notated compound duple metre. While both are notated with time signatures that have 6 as the top number, the former has six beats to a bar, while the latter has two beats to a bar. When 6/8 is used to signify sextuple metre, often the words "in six" or the equivalent in other languages are used to clarify the metre. An example of a piece in true sextuple time is Charles-Valentin Alkan's Barcarolette in E♭ minor, No. 12 of his 49 Esquisses, which is in compound sextuple time (18/8).

== See also ==
- Metre (hymn)
- Metre (poetry)
- Triple metre
- Duple and quadruple metre
- Composite rhythm
- Counting (music)
