= Counting (music) =

Musical system of regularly occurring sounds

In music, counting is a system of regularly occurring way to teach or learn the rhythm of a song to assist with the performance or audition of music by allowing the easy identification of the beat. Commonly, this involves verbally counting the beats in each measure as they occur, whether there be 2 beats, 3 beats, 4 beats, or even 5 beats. In addition to helping to normalize the time taken up by each beat, counting allows easier identification of the beats that are stressed. Counting is most commonly used with rhythm (often to decipher a difficult rhythm) and form and often involves subdivision.

== Introduction to systems: numbers and syllables ==
The method involving numbers may be termed count chant, "to identify it as a unique instructional process."

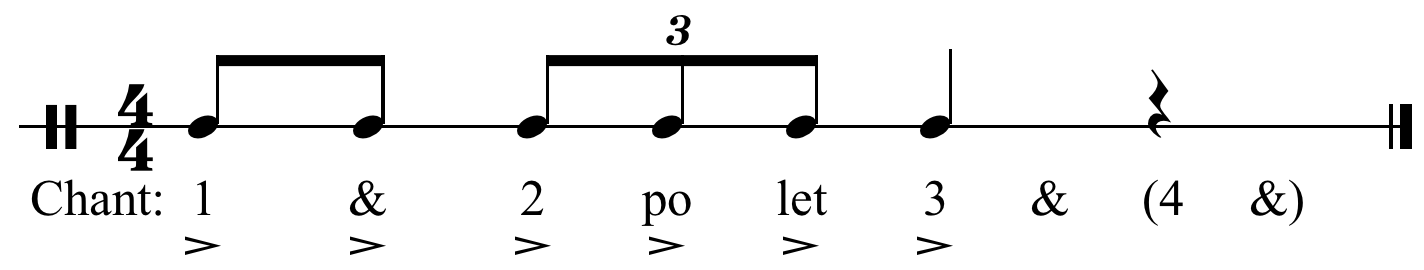
Example of "count chant" method

In lieu of simply counting the beats of a measure, other systems can be used which may be more appropriate to the particular piece of music. Depending on the tempo, the divisions of a beat may be vocalized as well (for slower times), or skipping numbers altogether (for faster times). As an alternative to counting, a metronome can be used to accomplish the same function.

Triple meter, such as 3/4, is often counted 1 2 3, while compound meter, such as 6/8, is often counted in two and subdivided "One-and-ah-Two-and-ah" but may be articulated as "One-la-lee-Two-la-lee". For each subdivision employed a new syllable is used. For example, sixteenth notes in 4/4 are counted 1 e & a 2 e & a 3 e & a 4 e & a, using numbers for the quarter note, "&" for the eighth note, and "e" and "a" for the sixteenth note level. Triplets may be counted "1 tri ple 2 tri ple 3 tri ple 4 tri ple" and sixteenth note triplets "1 la li + la li 2 la li + la li". Quarter note triplets, due to their different rhythmic feel, may be articulated differently as "1 dra git 3 dra git".

Rather than numbers or nonsense syllables, a random word may be assigned to a rhythm to clearly count each beat. An example is with a triplet, so that a triplet subdivision is often counted "tri-pl-et". The Kodály Method uses "Ta" for quarter notes and "Ti-Ti" for eighth notes. For sextuplets simply say triplet twice (see Sextuplet rhythm.png), while quintuplets may be articulated as "un-i-vers-i-ty", or other five-syllable words such as "hip-po-pot-a-mus". In some approaches, "rote-before-note", the fractional definitions of notes are not taught to children until after they are able to perform syllable or phrase-based versions of these rhythms.

"However the counting may be syllabized, the important skill is to keep the pulse steady and the division exact."

There are various ways to count rhythm, from simple numbers to counting syllables to beat placement syllables.

Here are a few examples.

== Numbers systems ==
=== Numbers ===
Ultimately, musicians count using numbers, “ands” and vowel sounds. Downbeats within a measure are called 1, 2, 3… Upbeats are represented with a plus sign and are called “and” (i.e. 1 + 2 +), and further subdivisions receive the sounds “ee” and “uh” (i.e. 1 e + a 2 e + a). Musicians do not agree on what to call triplets: some simply say the word triplet (“trip-a-let”), or another three-syllable word (like pineapple or elephant) with an antepenultimate accent. Some use numbers along with the word triplet (i.e. “1-trip-let”). Still others have devised sounds like “ah-lee” or “la-li” added after the number (i.e. 1-la-li, 2-la-li or 1-tee-duh, 2-tee-duh).

Example

The folk song lyric "This Old Man, he played one, he played knick-knack on my thumb, with a knick-knack paddy whack, give my dog a bone, this old man came rolling home" in 2/4 time would be said, "one and two one and two one and two and one and two and uh one and two ee and one ee and uh two one and two and one and two."

1 e and uh 2 e and uh 3 e and uh 4 e and uh

=== Traditional American system ===
Counts the beat number on the tactus, & on the half beat, and n-e-&-a for four sixteenth notes, n-&-a for a triplet or three eighth notes in compound meter, where n is the beat number.

=== Eastman system ===
The beat numbers are used for the tactus, te for the half beat, and n-ti-te-ta for four sixteenths. Triplets or three eighth notes in compound meter are n-la-li and six sixteenth notes in compound meter is n-ta-la-ta-li-ta.

=== Froseth system ===
Counting system using n-ne, n-ta-ne-ta, n-na-ni, and n-ta-na-ta-ni-ta. All three systems have internal consistency for all divisions of the beat except the tactus, which changes according to the beat number.

== Syllables systems ==
Syllables systems are categorized as "Beat Function Systems" – when the tactus (pulse) has certain syllable A, and the half-beat is always certain syllable B, regardless of how the rest of the measure is filled out.

=== French system ===
The "Galin-Paris-Chevé system" or French "Time-Names system", originally used French words. Toward the middle of the 19th century the American musician Lowell Mason (affectionately named the "Father of Music Education") adapted the French Time-Names system for use in the United States, and instead of using the French names of the notes, he replaced these with a system that identified the value of each note within a meter and the measure.

- Whole Note: Ta-a-a-a
- Half Note: Ta-a
- Quarter Note: Ta
- 2 Eighth Note: Ta Te
- 4 Sixteenth Notes: Tafa Tefe

=== Kodály method ===
- Whole Note: Ta-a-a-a or to-o-o-o
- Half Note: Ta-a or too
- Quarter Note: Ta
- 1 Eighth Note: Ti
- 2 Eighth Notes: Ti-Ti
- 4 Sixteenth Notes: Ti-ri-ti-ri or Ti-ka-ti-ka
- Eighth Note Triplet: Tri-o-la or Tri-po-let
- Eighth Note followed by a Quarter Note and another Eighth Note: Syn-co-pa
- Dotted Quarter Note followed by a single Eighth Note: Tam-ti

=== Ward method ===
- Whole Note: Lang-ng-ng-ng
- Half Note: Lang-ng
- Quarter Note: La
- 2 Eighth Notes: Lira
- Dotted Quarter followed by Eighth: La-ira

=== Edwin Gordon system ===
Usual duple meter

- Whole Note: Du-u-u-u
- Half Note: Du-u
- Quarter Note: Du
- 2 Eighth Notes: Du-De
- 4 Sixteenth Notes: Du-Ta-De-Ta

Usual triple meter

- Dotted Quarter Note: Du
- 3 Eighth Notes: Du-Da-Di
- 6 Sixteenth Notes: Du-Ta-Da-Ta-Di-Ta

Unusual meters pair the duple and triple meter syllables, and employ the "b" consonant.

=== Takadimi ===
The beat is always called ta. In simple meters, the division and subdivision are always ta-di and ta-ka-di-mi. Any note value can be the beat, depending on the time signature. In compound meters (wherein the beat is generally notated with dotted notes), the division and subdivision are always ta-ki-da and ta-va-ki-di-da-ma.

The note value does not receive a particular name; the note’s position within the beat gets the name. This system allows children to internalize a steady beat and to naturally discover the subdivisions of beat, similar to the down-ee-up-ee system.

The folk song lyric "This Old Man, he played one, he played knick-knack on my thumb, with a knick-knack paddy whack, give my dog a bone, this old man came rolling home" would be said, "tadi ta tadi ta tadi tadi tadi tadimi tadi takadi takadimi ta tadi tadi tadi ta."

==== Examples of simple meter rhythms (Takadimi) ====
Whole Note = ta-a-a-a

Half Note = Ta-a

Quarter Note = Ta

Two Eighth Notes = Ta-Di

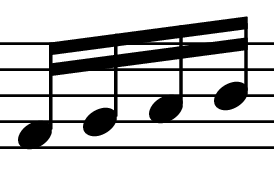
Four Sixteenth Notes = Ta-Ka-Di-Mi

Eighth Rest + Eighth Note = X-Di

Eighth Note + Two Sixteenth Notes = Taaa-Di-Mi

Two Sixteenth Notes + Eighth Note = Ta-Ka-Diii

==== Examples of compound meter rhythms (Takadimi) ====
Dotted Whole Note = Ta-a-a-a

Dotted Half Note = Ta-a

Dotted Quarter Note = Ta

Three Eighth Notes Beamed Together = Ta-Ki-Da

Eighth Note + Eighth Rest + Eighth Note = Ta-X-Da

Six Sixteenth Notes = Ta-Va-Ki-Di-Da-Ma

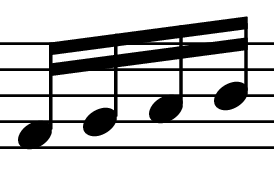

Eighth Note + Four Sixteenth Notes = Ta-aa-Ki-Di-Da-Ma

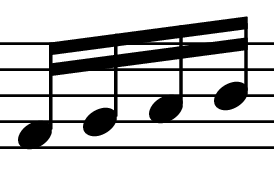

Four Sixteenth Notes + Eighth Note = Ta-Va-Ki-Di-Da-aa

Two Sixteenth Notes + Eighth Note + Two Sixteenth Notes = Ta-Va-Ki-ii-Da-Ma

=== Takatiki ===
This is a beat-function system used by some Kodály teachers that was developed by Laurdella Foulkes-Levy, and was designed to be easier to say than Gordon's system or the Takadimi system while still honoring the beat-function. The beat is said as "Ta" in both duple and triple meters, but the beat divisions are performed differently between the two meters. The "t" consonant always falls on the main beat and beat division, and the "k" consonant is always when the beat divides again. Alternating "t" and "k" in quick succession is easy to say, as they fall on two different parts of the tongue, making it very easy to say these syllables at a fast tempo (much like tonguing on recorder or flute). It is also a logical system since it always alternates between the same two consonants.

==== Duple meter ====
- Whole Note: Ta-a-a-a (no added accent on each beat)
- Half Note: Ta-a (no added accent on each beat)
- Quarter Note: Ta
- 2 Eighth Notes: Ta-Ti
- 4 Sixteenth Notes: Ta-Ka-Ti-Ki
- Sixteenth Note Combinations: Ta---Ti-Ki, Ta-Ka-Ti---, Ta-Ka---Ki
- Eighth Note followed by a Quarter Note and another Eighth Note: Ta-Ti---Ti
- Eighth Note Triplet: Ta-Tu-Te
- Rests: (silent)

==== Triple meter ====
- Dotted Half Note: Ta-a-a- (no added accent on each beat)
- Dotted Quarter Note : Ta-
- 3 Eighth Notes: Ta-Tu-Te
- Eighth Note Combinations: Ta----Te, Ta-Tu-----
- 6 Sixteenth Notes: Ta-Ka-Tu-Ku-Te-Ke
- Sixteenth Note Combinations: Ta--Tu-Ku-Te, Ta-Ka-Tu---Te, Ta--Tu--Te-Ke
- Rests: (silent)

=== Ta Titi ===
- Whole Note: Toe / ta-ah-ah-ah
- Dotted Half Note: Toom / ta-ah-ah
- Half Note: Too / ta-ah
- Dotted Quarter Note: Tom / ta-a
- Quarter Note: Ta
- 1 Eighth Note: Ti
- 2 Eighth Notes: Ti-Ti
- Eighth Note Triplet: Tri-o-la
- 2 Sixteenth Notes: Tika / Tiri
- 4 Sixteenth Notes: TikaTika / Tiritiri
- 2 Sixteenth Notes and 1 Eighth Note: Tika-Ti / Tiri-Ti
- 1 Eighth Note and 2 Sixteenths: Ti-Tika / Ti-Tiri

This system allows the value of each note to be clearly represented no matter its placement within the beat/measure.

For example, the folk song lyric "This Old Man, he played one, he played knick-knack on my thumb, with a knick-knack paddy whack, give my dog a bone, this old man came rolling home" would be said, "titi ta titi ta titi titi titi ti-tiri titi tiriti tiritiri ta titi titi titi ta".

=== Down-ee up-ee ===
Downbeats are "down", up-beats are "up", subdivisions are "ee".

For example, the folk song lyric "This Old Man, he played one, he played knick-knack on my thumb, with a knick-knack paddy whack, give my dog a bone, this old man came rolling home" would be said, "down up down down up down down up down up down up down up-ee down up down-ee-up down-ee-up-ee down down up down up down up down."

== Mixed numbers and syllables systems ==
=== McHose/Tibbs ===
1 2 3 4,

== Other systems ==
=== Orff system ===
Orff rhythm syllables don't have a specified system. Often, they'll encourage teachers to use whatever they prefer, and many choose to use the Kodaly syllable system. Outside of this, Orff teachers will often use a language-based model in which the rhythms are replaced with a word which matches the number of sounds in the rhythm. For example, two paired eighth notes may become "Jackie" or "Apple." Often, a teacher will stick with a theme and encourage students to create their own words within said theme. Examples include:

- Food
- Animals
- Names
- Objects in the room
- Sports

== See also ==
- Count off
- Half-time (music)
- Bol - a Hindustani (north indian) system of rhythm syllables.
- Konnakol - a Carnatic (south Indian) system of rhythm syllables.
- Émile-Joseph-Maurice Chevé
- Poll - "Elementary General Music Educators: Which system do you use to teach rhythm ?"
