= Pulse (music) =

Series of musical beats

In music theory, the pulse is a series of uniformly spaced beats—either audible or implied—that sets the tempo and is the scaffolding for the rhythm. By contrast, rhythm is always audible and can depart from the pulse. So while the rhythm may become too difficult for an untrained listener to fully match, nearly any listener instinctively matches the pulse by simply tapping uniformly, despite rhythmic variations in timing of sounds alongside the pulse.

== Definitions ==
Metric levels: beat level shown in middle with division levels above and multiple levels below.

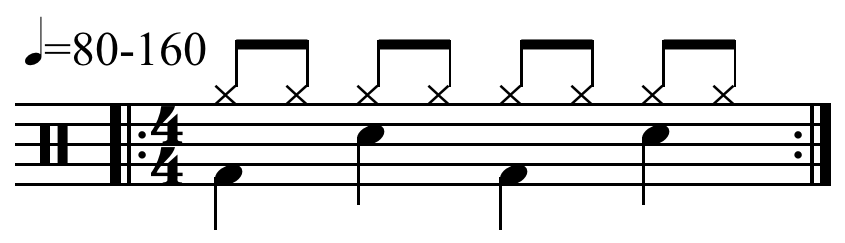
Simple quadruple drum pattern, rock drum kit. Despite the presence of eighth notes, there is a quarter note beat.

The tempo is the speed of the pulse. If a pulse becomes too fast it would become a drone; one that is too slow would be perceived as unconnected sounds. When the period of any continuous beat is faster than 8–10 per second or slower than 1 per 1.5–2 seconds, it cannot be perceived as such. "Musical" pulses are generally specified in the range 40–240 beats per minute. The pulse is not necessarily the fastest or the slowest component of the rhythm but the one that is perceived as basic. This is currently most often designated as a crotchet (quarter note) when written (see time signature).

Pulse is related to and distinguished from rhythm (grouping), beats, and meter:

A pulse is one of a series of regularly recurring, precisely equivalent ["undifferentiated"] stimuli. Like the tick of a metronome or a watch, pulses mark off equal units in the temporal continuum.... A sense of regular pulses, once established, tends to be continued in the mind and musculature of the listener, even though the sound has stopped.... The human mind tends to impose some sort of organization upon such equal pulses. ...

[Pulse is] an important part of musical experience. Not only is pulse necessary for the existence of meter ["there can be no meter without an underlying pulse to establish the units of measurement"], but it generally, though not always, underlies and reinforces rhythmic experience.

Meter is the measurement of the number of pulses between more or less regularly recurring accents. So for meter to exist, some of the pulses in a series must be accented—marked for consciousness—relative to others. When pulses are thus counted within a metric context, they are referred to as beats.

— Leonard B. Meyer and Cooper (1960)

== Pulse groups ==
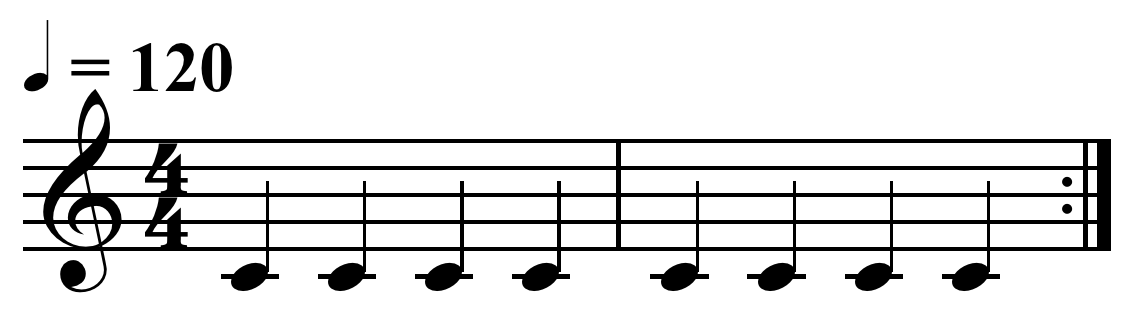
Clear quarter note pulse in 4/4 at a tempo of =120. At =600 the pulse becomes a drone, while at =30 the pulse becomes disconnected sounds.

While ideal pulses are identical, when pulses are variously accented, this produces two- or three-pulse pulse groups such as strong–weak and strong–weak–weak and any longer group may be broken into such groups of two and three. In fact there is a natural tendency to perceptually group or differentiate an ideal pulse in this way. A repetitive, regularly accented pulse-group is called a metre.

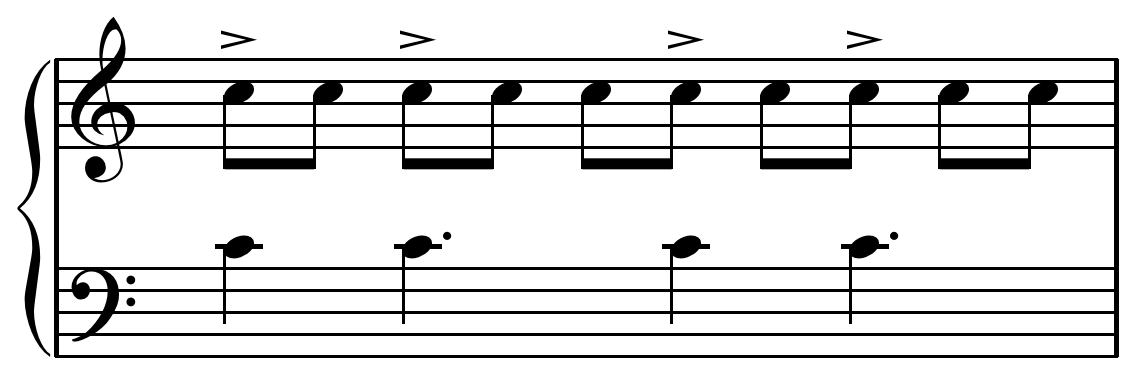
Varied pulse groups equals non-isochronal multiple level.

Pulses can occur at multiple metric levels – see figure. Pulse groups may be distinguished as synchronous, if all pulses on slower levels coincide with those on faster levels, and nonsynchronous, if not.

An isochronal or equally spaced pulse on one level that uses varied pulse groups (rather than just one pulse group the whole piece) create a pulse on the (slower) multiple level that is non-isochronal (a stream of 2+3... at eighth-note level would create a pulse of a quarter note+dotted quarter note as its multiple level).

== See also ==
- Composite rhythm
- Metre (hymn)
- Metre (poetry)
- Triple metre
- Duple and quadruple metre
- Sextuple metre
- Counting (music)
