= Rosanna shuffle =

Drum pattern from the hit Toto song "Rosanna"

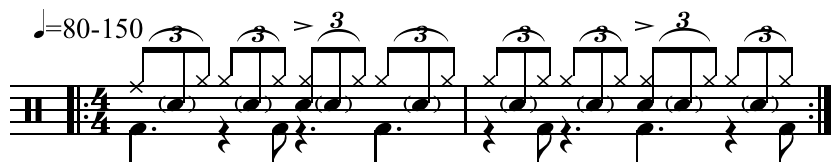
"Rosanna shuffle".

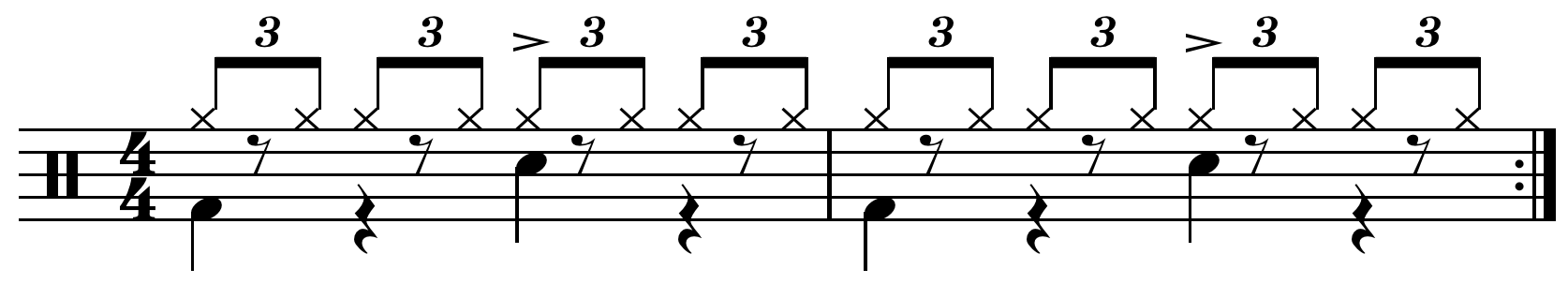
"Basic half-time shuffle".

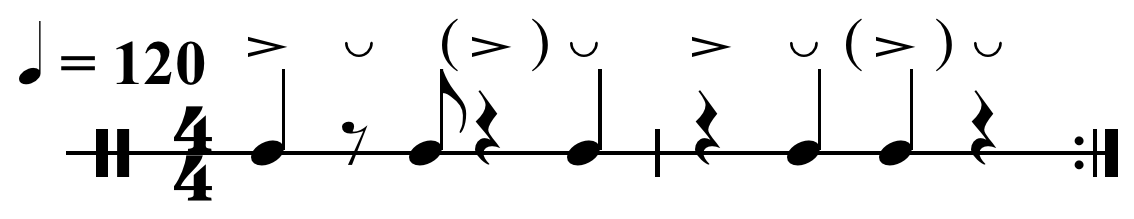
"Bo Diddley beat"/Son clave.

The Rosanna shuffle is the drum pattern from the 1982 Toto song "Rosanna", played by Jeff Porcaro.

It is known as a "half-time shuffle" and shows "definite jazz influence". Porcaro created the rhythm by combining various influences including the Purdie shuffle, the drum pattern played by John Bonham in the song "Fool in the Rain" and the Bo Diddley beat, along with many ghost notes.
