= Nat Gonella =

English jazz trumpeter, bandleader, and vocalist (1908–1998)

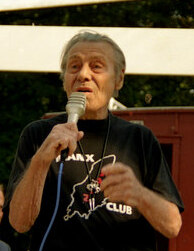
- Gonella in 1995

Background information
- Born: Nathaniel Charles Gonella; 7 March 1908; Islington, London, England
- Died: 6 August 1998 (aged 90) Gosport, Hampshire
- Genres: Dixieland, British dance band
- Occupations: Musician, bandleader
- Instruments: Trumpet, mellophone
- Formerly of: Humphrey Lyttelton, Digby Fairweather, The Georgians

Nathaniel Charles Gonella (7 March 1908 – 6 August 1998) was an English jazz trumpeter, bandleader, vocalist, and mellophonist. He founded the big band The Georgians, during the British dance band era.

== Early life and career ==
Gonella was born in Islington, North London, where he attended St Mary's Guardian School, an institution for underprivileged children, where he started playing cornet.

After a short spell as a furrier's apprentice, his professional career began in 1924 when he joined Archie Pitt's Busby Boy's Band, a small pit orchestra and touring review band. During his four years with the band, he discovered the music of Louis Armstrong and dixieland jazz. He transcribed Armstrong's solos and learned them by heart. Beginning in 1928, Gonella spent a year in Bob Bryden's Louisville Band before working with Archie Alexander and Billy Cotton. Cotton's band allowed him to record his first solos and to explore scat singing.

== The 1930s ==
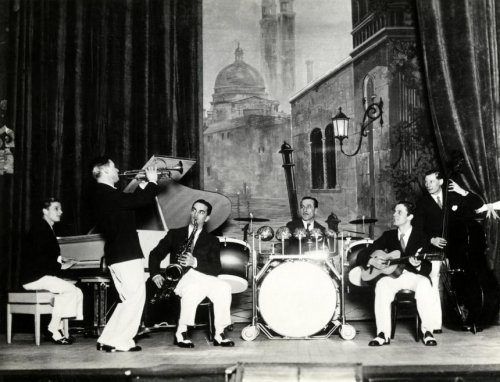
Nat Gonella & the New Georgians

He played briefly with Roy Fox in 1931 and remained in the band when Lew Stone, Fox's former pianist, took over leadership the following year. With Stone's band he established his reputation. When Louis Armstrong visited London in 1932, Gonella met him by begging the staff at the Boosey and Hawkes music shop to allow him to deliver Armstrong's trumpet, which had been left at the shop for cleaning. Armstrong appreciated his willingness to help, and the two became friends.

In 1933 Gonella published Modern Style Trumpet Playing – A Comprehensive Course. He made uncredited appearances with Lew Stone and Al Bowlly in the films Bitter Sweet and The King's Cup.

Gonella's reputation grew when he formed The Georgians in 1935. The band took its name from a popular version of the song "Georgia on My Mind" that he recorded for Lew Stone in 1932 and which became the trumpeter's signature tune. The Georgians began as a band within Stone's shows before setting up as an independent unit. He became a headline act on the variety circuit before the outbreak of World War II.

Evacuated to Rhyl in North Wales in the early part of the war, along with Manchester Repertory Company.

== The 1940s and 1950s ==
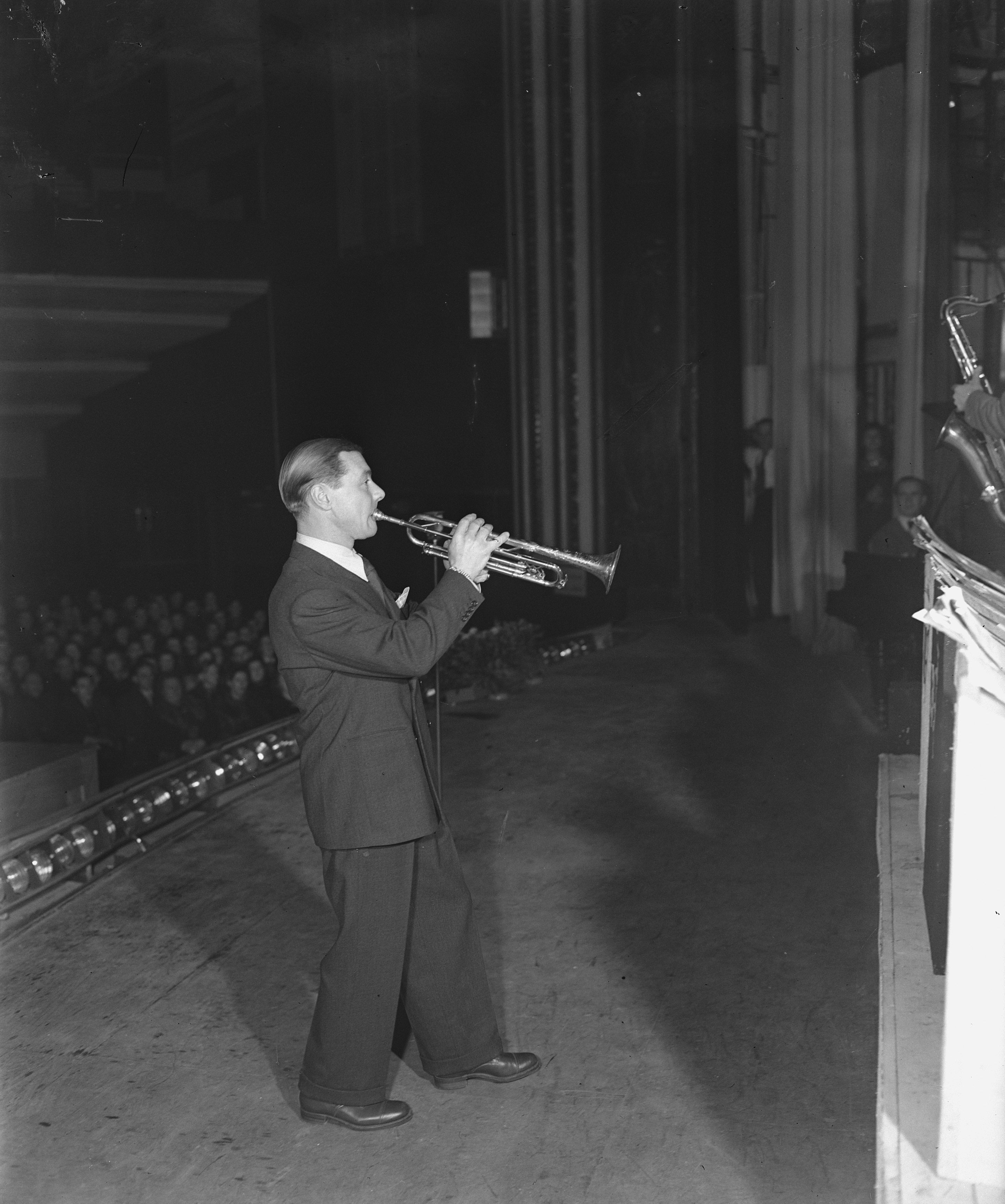
Nat Gonella (1946)

He joined the army in 1941, and was recruited into the Stars in Battledress campaign, touring allied camps in Europe and North Africa. In February 1945 he played in RTR band for troops at an army camp near Bournemouth, either Bovington or Lulworth. [unpublished diary John Robson Edwards] Whilst in Europe and North Africa Gonella served as the personal servant or "batman" to Major Alexander Karet and once the war had ended was offered the position as personal Butler to the Major, but he politely declined the offer, so that he could be free to pursue his musical career.

He reformed his band after the war, but the economic and musical climate was changing rapidly at that time. He flirted briefly with bebop, acknowledged that it was not for him, and returned to the variety stage during the 1950s, touring with the likes of the comedian Max Miller.

== The 1960s and 1970s ==
The revival in traditional jazz in the late Fifties allowed him to reform his Georgians in 1960. On 22nd February 1960 he featured on the UK television show This Is Your Life, an appearance which later inspired an album The Nat Gonella Story, modelled on Louis Armstrong's A Musical Autobiography. He also appeared on the BBC radio programme Desert Island Discs in August 1966.

All of this attention re-established Gonella, at least until the advent of The Beatles brought the trad jazz boom to a halt. He moved to Lancashire in 1962, and toured regularly on the Northern club circuit until his alleged retirement on his 65th birthday, on 7 March 1973.

== Post-retirement ==
That retirement did not last long. Drummer Ted Easton persuaded him to come to play to his (Easton's) club in the Netherlands during the mid-1970s, and a new recording of a song he had first cut with Roy Fox in 1931, "Oh, Monah", became a big hit in the Netherlands.

It was to be his final flourish on trumpet, but he continued to sing after moving to Gosport, Hampshire, in 1977 – where a square was renamed in his honour in 1994, and was always happy to stand up and do so in a local pubs or at the Gosport Jazz Club.

Digby Fairweather's New Georgians paid tribute to Gonella's musical heritage in 1984, and Fairweather and fellow trumpeter Humphrey Lyttelton co-hosted a television tribute, Fifty Years of Nat Gonella, the following year, in which Gonella himself was an enthusiastic participant.

He continued to sing occasionally with various bands, and made the headlines again in 1997 when a sampled excerpt of his trumpet playing from a recording he made in 1932 was used in White Town's number one pop hit "Your Woman". The same sample was later used for Dua Lipa's 2020 song "Love Again".

Nat Gonella died at the [[Gosport War Memorial Hospital 1990s opioid deaths scandal|Gosport War Memorial Hospital]], Hampshire on 6 August 1998, aged 90.

Gonella was a down-to-earth and unassuming character, and remained so throughout his life. On BBC Radio 4, Barry Humphries said that "Oh Mona" was one of two tracks that had most appealed to him in his life. Humphrey Lyttelton is among those who have testified to the fact that fame and success sat easily on Gonella's shoulders, and reports that he would show genuine astonishment when Lyttelton would confess, as well as other prominent musicians, to Gonella having been his first jazz hero.
