= Additive rhythm and divisive rhythm =

Types of rhythm and meter

In music, the terms additive and divisive are used to distinguish two types of both rhythm and meter:

- A divisive (or, alternately, multiplicative) rhythm is a rhythm in which a larger period of time is divided into smaller rhythmic units or, conversely, some integer unit is regularly multiplied into larger, equal units.
- This can be contrasted with additive rhythm, in which larger periods of time are constructed by concatenating (joining end to end) a series of units into larger units of unequal length, such as a 5/8 meter produced by the regular alternation of 2/8 and 3/8.

When applied to meters, the terms perfect and imperfect are sometimes used as the equivalents of divisive and additive, respectively .

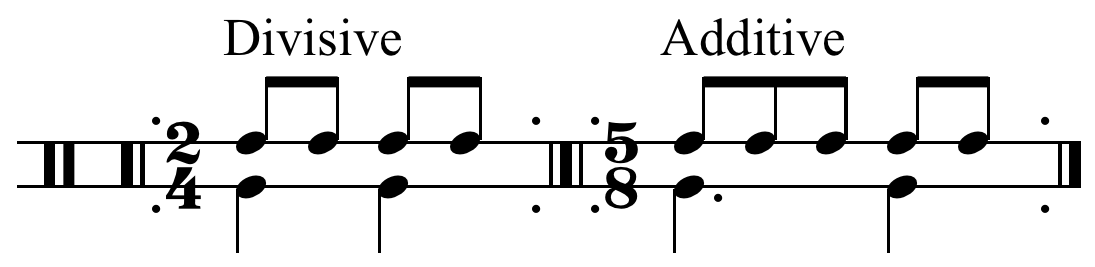
Additive and divisive meters.

For example, 4 may be evenly divided by 2 or reached by adding 2 + 2. In contrast, 5 is only evenly divisible by 5 and 1 and may be reached by adding 2 or 3. Thus, 4/8 (or, more commonly, 2/4) is divisive while 5/8 is additive.

Sub-Saharan African music and most European (Western) music is divisive, while Indian and other Asian musics may be considered as primarily additive. However, many pieces of music cannot be clearly labeled divisive or additive.

== Description ==
The terms additive and divisive originate with Curt Sachs's book Rhythm and Tempo (1953). The relationship between additive and divisive rhythms is complex, and the terms are often used in imprecise ways. In his article on rhythm in the second edition of the New Grove Dictionary of Music and Musicians, Justin London states that:

[i]n discussions of rhythmic notation, practice or style, few terms are as confusing or used as confusedly as 'additive' and 'divisive'. … These confusions stem from two misapprehensions. The first is a failure to distinguish between systems of notation (which may have both additive and divisive aspects) and the music notated under such a system. The second involves a failure to understand the divisive and additive aspects of meter itself.

Winold recommends that, "metric structure is best described through detailed analysis of pulse groupings on various levels rather than through attempts to represent the organization with a single term".

=== Divisive rhythm ===
For example: 4/4 consists of one measure (whole note: 1) divided into a stronger first beat and slightly less strong second beat (half notes: 1, 3), which are in turn divided, by two weaker beats (quarter notes: 1, 2, 3, 4), and again divided into still weaker beats (eighth notes: 1 & 2 & 3 & 4 &).

Divisive rhythm in 4/4 time

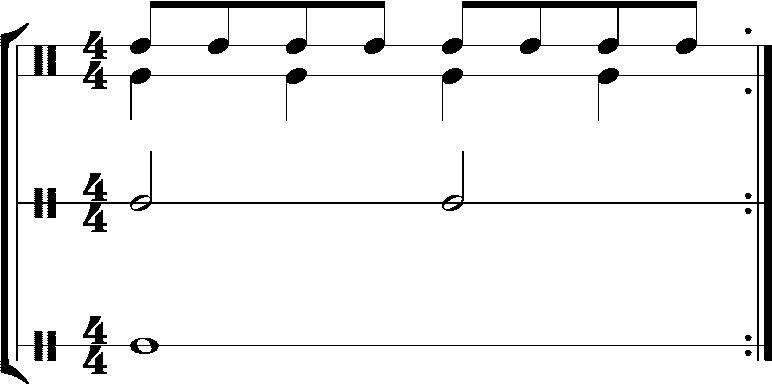
Divisive Rhythm. 1 whole note = 2 half notes = 4 quarter notes = 8 eighth notes = 16 sixteenth notes

=== Additive rhythm ===
Additive rhythm features nonidentical or irregular durational groups following one another at two levels, within the bar and between bars or groups of bars. This type of rhythm is also referred to in musicological literature by the Turkish word aksak, which means "limping". In the special case of time signatures in which the upper numeral is not divisible by two or three without a fraction, the result may alternatively be called irregular, imperfect, or uneven meter, and the groupings into twos and threes are sometimes called long beats and short beats.

Additive rhythm in 3+3+2/8 time

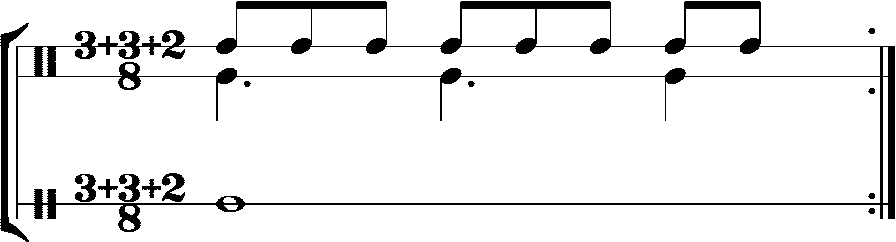
Additive rhythm 3+3+2/8 time. 1 whole note = 8 eighth notes = 3 + 3 + 2.

The term additive rhythm is also often used to refer to what are also incorrectly called asymmetric rhythms and even irregular rhythms – that is, meters which have a regular pattern of beats of uneven length. For example, the time signature 4/4 indicates each bar is eight quavers long, and has four beats, each a crotchet (that is, two quavers) long. The asymmetric time signature 3+3+2/8, on the other hand, while also having eight quavers in a bar, divides them into three beats, the first three quavers long, the second three quavers long, and the last just two quavers long.

== Examples ==
=== Sub-Saharan African rhythm ===
A divisive form of cross-rhythm is the basis for most Sub-Saharan African music traditions. Rhythmic patterns are generated by simultaneously dividing a span of musical time by a triple-beat scheme and a duple-beat scheme.

In the development of cross rhythm, there are some selected rhythmic materials or beat schemes that are customarily used. These beat schemes, in their generic forms, are simple divisions of the same musical period in equal units, producing varying rhythmic densities or motions. At the center of a core of rhythmic traditions within which the composer conveys his ideas is the technique of cross-rhythm. The technique of cross-rhythm is a simultaneous use of contrasting rhythmic patterns within the same scheme of accents or meter... By the very nature of the desired resultant rhythm, the main beat scheme cannot be separated from the secondary beat scheme. It is the interplay of the two elements that produces the cross-rhythmic texture.

"the entire African rhythmic structure... is divisive in nature".

Do African musicians think additively? The evidence so far is that they do not. Writing in 1972 about the Yoruba version of the standard pattern, Kubik stated. 'There is no evidence that the musicians themselves think it as additive.' I have argued elsewhere that additive thinking is foreign to many African musicians' ways of proceeding. ... Then, too, there appears to be no trace of an additive conception in the discourses of musicians, whether directly or indirectly. … It would seem, then, that whereas structural analysis (based on European metalanguage) endorses an additive conception of the standard pattern, cultural analysis (originating in African musicians' thinking) denies it, ... no dancer thinks in cycles of 12 when interpreting the standard pattern. The evidence of the rate at which the dance feet move is that 4, not 12, is the reckoning that most closely approximates the regulative beat. ... what can be said for sure is that the cycle of four beats is felt and thus relied upon. This is cultural knowledge that players and especially dancers possess; without such knowledge, it is difficult to perform accurately.

The African rhythmic structure which generates the standard pattern is a divisive structure and not an additive one … the standard pattern represents a series of attack points that outline the onbeat three-against-two / offbeat three-against-two sequence, not a series of durational values".

=== Classical music ===
Additive rhythms are used, for example, by Béla Bartók, who was influenced by similar rhythms in Bulgarian folk music.

Bartok Dance in Bulgarian Rhythm No. 6

Bartok, Number 6 of Six Dances in Bulgarian Rhythm from Mikrokosmos Book 6

The third movement of Bartók's String Quartet No. 5, a scherzo marked alla bulgarese features a "9/8 rhythm (4+2+3)". Stravinsky's Octet for Wind Instruments "ends with a jazzy 3+3+2 = 8 swung coda". Stravinsky himself found a kinship with additive rhythms in music of the Renaissance and Baroque periods. For example, he marvelled at the Laudate Pueri from Monteverdi's Vespers of 1610, where the music follows the natural accentuation of the Latin words to create metrical groupings of twos, threes and fours at the very start: "I know of no music before or since…. which so felicitously exploits accentual and metrical variation and irregularity, and no more subtle rhythmic construction of any kind than that which is set in motion at the beginning of the 'Laudate Pueri,’ if, that is, the music is sung according to the verbal accents instead of... the editor's bar-lines".

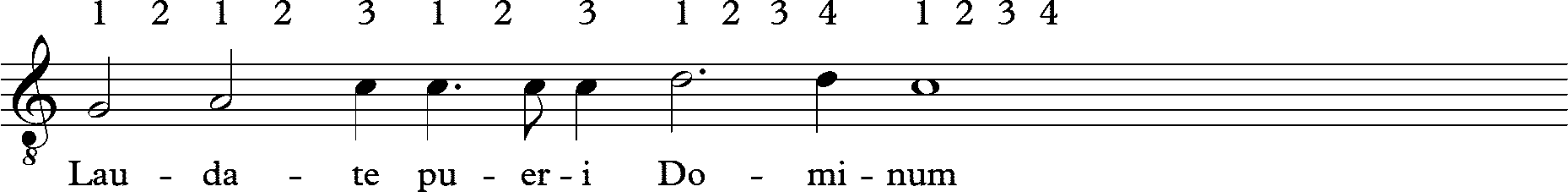
Monteverdi opening of Laudate Pueri

Olivier Messiaen made extensive use of additive rhythmic patterns, much of it stemming from his close study of the rhythms of Indian music. His "Danse de la fureur, pour les sept trompettes" from The Quartet for the End of Time is a bracing example. A gentler exploration of additive patterns can be found in "Le Regard de la Vierge" from the same composer's piano cycle Vingt regards sur l'enfant-Jésus.

Additive patterns also occur in some music of Philip Glass, and other minimalists, most noticeably the "one-two-one-two-three" chorus parts in Einstein on the Beach. They may also occur in passing in pieces which are on the whole in conventional meters.

György Ligeti's Étude No. 13, "L'escalier du diable" features patterns involving quavers grouped in twos and threes. The rhythm at the start of the study follows the pattern 2+2+3, then 2+2+2+3. According to the composer's note, the 12/8 time signature "serves only as a guideline, the actual meter consists of 36 quavers (three 'bars'), divided asymmetrically".

=== Other music ===
In jazz, Dave Brubeck's "Blue Rondo à la Turk" features bars of nine quavers grouped into patterns of 2+2+2+3 at the start.

George Harrison's song "Here Comes the Sun" on The Beatles' Abbey Road features a rhythm "which switches between 11/8, 4/4 and 7/8 on the bridge". "The special effect of running even eighth notes accented as if triplets against the grain of the underlying backbeat is carried to a point more reminiscent of Stravinsky than of the Beatles".

== Tresillo: divisive and additive interpretations ==
In divisive form, the strokes of tresillo contradict the beats. In additive form, the strokes of tresillo are the beats. From a metrical perspective then, the two ways of perceiving tresillo constitute two different rhythms. On the other hand, from the perspective of simply the pattern of attack-points, tresillo is a shared element of traditional folk music from the northwest tip of Africa to southeast tip of Asia.

=== Additive structure ===
"Tresillo" is also found within a wide geographic belt stretching from Morocco in North Africa to Indonesia in South Asia. Use of the pattern in Moroccan music can be traced back to slaves brought north across the Sahara Desert from present-day Mali. This pattern may have migrated east from North Africa to Asia through the spread of Islam. In Middle Eastern and Asian music, the figure is generated through additive rhythm.

=== Divisive structure ===
The most basic duple-pulse figure found in the Music of Africa and music of the African diaspora is a figure the Cubans call tresillo, a Spanish word meaning 'triplet' (three equal beats in the same time as two main beats). However, in the vernacular of Cuban popular music, the term refers to the figure shown below.

African-based music has a divisive rhythm structure. Tresillo is generated through cross-rhythm: 8 pulses ÷ 3 = 2 cross-beats (consisting of three pulses each), with a remainder of a partial cross-beat (spanning two pulses). In other words, 8 ÷ 3 = 2, r2. Tresillo is a cross-rhythmic fragment.

Because of its irregular pattern of attack-points, "tresillo" in African and African-based musics has been mistaken for a form of additive rhythm.

Although the difference between the two ways of notating this rhythm may seem small, they stem from fundamentally different conceptions. Those who wish to convey a sense of the rhythm's background [main beats], and who understand the surface morphology in relation to a regular subsurface articulation, will prefer the divisive format. Those who imagine the addition of three, then three, then two sixteenth notes will treat the well-formedness of 3 + 3 + 2 as fortuitous, a product of grouping rather than of metrical structure. They will be tempted to deny that African music has a bona fide metrical structure because of its frequent departures from normative grouping structure.

== See also ==
- Counting (music)
