= Saxie Dowell =

American songwriter

- Born: Horace Kirby Dowell; May 24, 1904; Raleigh, North Carolina
- Died: July 22, 1974 (aged 70) Scottsdale, Arizona
- Genres: Jazz
- Occupation: Musician
- Instruments: Saxophone, clarinet
- Years active: 1920s–1950s
- Labels: Brunswick, Lenora, Victor
- Formerly of: Hal Kemp

Horace Kirby Dowell (May 24, 1904 – July 22, 1974), known professionally as Saxie Dowell, was an American jazz saxophonist.

== Biography ==
Dowell was born in Raleigh, North Carolina, and attended the University of North Carolina, where he met Hal Kemp. He joined Kemp's orchestra as a reed player (tenor saxophone, clarinet, and flute) and vocalist in the fall of 1925. Dowell composed "I Don't Care", which was recorded by Kemp for Brunswick in 1928. When the band's style changed in the early 1930s to that of a dance band, Dowell became the group's comedic vocalist for novelty songs. After "Three Little Fishies" became a hit in 1939, Dowell was involved in a legal dispute with lyricists Josephine Carringer and Bernice Idins. In 1940 he wrote the song "Playmates".

Dowell left Kemp in started a big band in 1940. During World War II he was drafted and served as a bandleader aboard an aircraft carrier, the U.S.S. Franklin. The band survived a bombing attack by Japanese forces, then performed while the wreckage was cleaned up. He wrote and sang the novelty song "Three Little Fishies" and recorded for Brunswick, Sonora, and Victor. Around 1946 he led a naval air station band with 14-year-old Keely Smith as a singer. After the war he reunited his orchestra, performing mostly in Chicago. In 1949 he became a disc jockey for WGN radio in Chicago. He retired in the late 1950s and moved to Scottsdale, Arizona. He worked as a disc jockey part-time for KTAR in Phoenix during his retirement.
