= Drei Chinesen mit dem Kontrabass =

German children's song

"Drei Chinesen mit dem Kontrabass" (Three Chinese or Chinamen With A Double Bass) is a popular nonsensical German children's song. Its distinctive feature is a very simple form of word play: while the lyrics remain in effect unchanged, in each consecutive stanza all the vowels are replaced by one single vowel, with that single vowel changing in each new stanza.

== Melody ==
The most widely used tune today is as follows; slight variations in the dotted quarter notes are not uncommon:

A slightly different tune used to be more common in Germany and still prevails in Western Austria and the German speaking part of Switzerland:

Note that the ambitus is only a fourth in the latter but a Minor seventh in the former Variation.

== Rules of the game: Lyrics ==
The first stanza is sung in correct German:

Drei Chinesen mit dem Kontrabass saßen auf der Straße und erzählten sich was. Da kam die Polizei, fragt, was ist denn das? Drei Chinesen mit dem Kontrabass.	Three Chinese with a double bass Sat on the street and chatted. Along came the police and asked: "what is that?" Three Chinese with a double bass.

At least eight stanzas follow, in which all the vowels are consecutively interchanged by the eight monophthongs found in the German language, following the order A, E, I, O, U, Ä, Ö, Ü. Thus, the second stanza goes

Dra Chanasan mat dam Kantrabass

saßan af dar Straßa and arzahltan sach was.
Da kam da Palaza, fragt, was ast dann das?

Dra Chanasan mat dam Kantrabass.

Sometimes the game is extended to diphthongs (ai, au and so on). In another variation one of the players announces the next vowel change by shouting `Nochmal!` (Again!), or, rather nachmal, nechmel, etc.

== History ==
As is the case with many children's songs, the origins of the Three Chinese are difficult to determine. Germany's performance rights organization GEMA classifies it as a "copyright-free folksong".

However, the song is relatively young; even its direct forerunners cannot be traced back much farther than World War I. For a song of such widespread popularity, written evidence is surprisingly scarce.

=== Origin of lyrics and tune ===
==== Lyrics ====
The collected evidence suggests that the origin of the song lies in the Northeast of the former German-speaking world. The protagonists of the standard version today are three Chinese people; this element first appears in a version recorded in 1922 in Tartu, a city in Estonia which until the end of World War II was home to a sizeable minority of Baltic Germans. However, most versions recorded before 1945 feature "Japanesemen" (Japanesen) instead; this variant was first recorded in Pomerania in 1909. The expected word used in German to refer to a native of Japan would be Japaner, but for rhythmic reasons the somewhat outdated Japanesen was usually preferred. In 1913 the first printed version was published in Berlin with the title Drei Japanesen mit 'nem Bass. Not only the nationality of chatting Asians varies in the early records, but also their number. Thus, a version from Upper Silesia has ten, as well as another from Westphalia, has twenty "Japanesemen".

The version featuring "Japanesemen" is still popular in some parts of Switzerland, and a particularly inventive variant attested in Ticino not only rounds off the song with a final yodel but has the Asians sitting on the street not with, but without a double bass. The reason for this could be that some of the oldest known variants do not feature any musical instrument at all, but rather have the Asians sitting on a street without a passport (German Pass), which would even lend some meaning to the lines. Whether these are in fact the original lyrics or whether they are later well-meant corrections has not yet been determined.

Furthermore, the precise type of musical instrument was not settled until around 1940. The threefold repetition of the monosyllabic Bass was gradually replaced by Kontrabass, which in fact fits much better into the metric structure of the text. Thus, the song book Der Kilometerstein in the 1934 Potsdam edition furnished by Gustav Scholten still has the Bass, while the 1941 Mainz edition by Ludwig Voggenreiter already reads Kontrabass.

In fact, there are hardly two identical versions in the early records. While this holds true for most folksongs, the fact that the Three Chinesemen are not only a song but also a game may account for the irregularities. Almost every single word has been changed over time. Thus, there are variants that have the Asians sitting, standing, or walking on the street, while they were chatting or singing, and at times they even did all this not on a street at all, but rather in the woods.

Not until the 1970s did the song books uniformly settle upon the version cited in the introduction. The main reason for this is most certainly the standardizing effect of mass media, in this case the Schlager-inflected recording sung by the trio Medium-Terzett, which hit the German charts in 1968 and was then broadcast on television and radio countless times.

A Hebrew version also exists, called "שניים סינים עם כינור גדול" (Two Chinese with a big violin). It is commonly taught in Israeli kindergartens. The tune and the lyrics are similar to the first version above; see the Hebrew version of this article for more details.

An Italian version also exists, called "Tre Cinesi" (Three Chinese).

==== Tune ====
The basic tunes noted above have been in use virtually since the very first records. In some instances, the melody combines elements of both; for instance, the early Estonian and Pomeranian versions are closer to today's "Swiss" tune, while further west the "German" tune seems to have prevailed from the start. Most of the older versions exhibit a more complex harmonic and rhythmic structure than the extant two tunes, though; some demanded a triadic arpeggio or other more complex chords at some points, others covered wider intervals. The gradual simplification of the melody may be due to the fact that it is after all a children's song; it may have been altered for pedagogical purposes, i.e. to suit the faculties of kindergarten-age children. In any case, the fifth interval that rules both extant tunes is typical for text-oriented songs and thus fits the use of the song as a game.

=== Origin and rules of the game ===
The vowel exchange was not the original game associated with the song. A version published in Leipzig in 1913 (G. Winter, Ringel, Ringel, Rosenkranz. Leipzig 1913) entitled "Ein Japanese mit dem Bass" (One Japanese Man With A Bass) is conceived as a kind of Ring a Ring O'Roses game and does not provide any alteration of the lyrics at all. A rule from 1929 for "Ein Chinese mit dem Bass, Bass, Bass" (A Chineseman with a bass, bass, bass), says how the children stand and sing in a ring, while somebody goes around tapping them on the shoulder at random. The child who is tapped then has to go into the interior of the circle. Once there are enough children in the circle, they start jumping around.

In other variants the variable parameter were not the vowels but the number of musical Asians. The Pomeranian version from 1909 increases the number of Japanesemen by one with every stanza (Zwei Japanesen mit dem Bass ..., Drei Japanesen ... etc.), other variants counted them down from twenty or ten.

The game involving an exchange of the vowels is first recorded in the above-mentioned 1934 edition of Der Kilometerstein. Han Sen, a Chinese writer who was born in Berlin in 1925 but emigrated shortly after the "Machtergreifung" notes in his autobiography (entitled Ein Chinese mit dem Kontrabass) that he knew this rule in his childhood; it must therefore have been current before 1933 at least in Berlin. The fast increasing popularity of the game in the twenties may be explained by the taste of the age. It was the early heyday of German Schlager. Many hits of the age owed their comic effect on wellnigh dadaist meaninglessness and simple nonsensical rhymes such as Mein Onkel Bumba aus Kalumba ("My uncle Bumba from Kalumba") or Mein Papagei frisst keine harten Eier ("My parrot won't eat hard-boiled eggs").

It is possible that the idea of vowel exchange derives from like games played by children in Romance-speaking Europe. The same vowel-exchange rule applies to the Spanish song-game La mar estaba serena (also: salada) and, with some differences, the Italian Garibaldi fu ferito.

Children of Turkish immigrants to Germany have picked up both tune and game and adapted it to the peculiarities of the Turkish language. Unlike German, the Turkish language has a vowel harmony system, which accords much greater significance to the vowels in the process of semantic signification. Therefore, while the meaning of the lyrics remains discernible in German at any stage of the game, new words appear in later verses in Turkish. Hilarity ensues.

=== The Three Chinese in German culture ===
Being one of the best-known German songs, it is not surprising that references to the Three Chinese have cropped up in many fields of contemporary German culture. Han Sen's autobiography was probably the most prominent occurrence in recent years. The 1998 movie Drei Chinesen mit dem Kontrabass does not contain any other reference to the song save its title. In the following year, crime fiction writer Lisa Pei published a whodunit under the same title, in which a bass-playing teacher is a murder suspect. A 1997 picture book by Luis Murschetz plays on the question of what the Chinesemen were actually talking about.

In 1981, cartoonist Hans Traxler included the parody Anton Dvořak mit dem Kontrabaß in his volume Leute von Gestern. Visual artists have also picked up the topic, such as the Cologne-based Rune Mields, whose 1992 work bearing the song's title played on the contrast between Chinese arts such calligraphy, ripe with meaning and tradition, and the anarchic, childlike playfulness of the song. Yueyang Wang, a Chinese audio artist living in Germany, dealt with a more delicate facet of the lyrics in one of her installations, namely its supposed affinity to xenophobia. While there is no explicit textual evidence for this interpretation, the very absurdity of the lyrics leaves ample space for speculations.

More or less easygoing reinterpretations have emerged in popular culture since the Medium-Terzett hit the charts with their version in 1968. The anti-nuclear movement of the 1980s appropriated the song for its purposes. After the declaration of independence of the micronation Republik Freies Wendland sit-inners blocking the transportation of radioactive waste to the repository facility at Gorleben repeatedly intoned the tune, twisting the lyrics to a national anthem of sorts: "Zwanzigtausend mit dem Wendenpass / saßen auf der Straße..." (Twenty thousand with a Wendian passport/ sat on the street/ etc.).

In 1998 and 2000 two of German hip hop's most prominent acts mangled the song in their tracks, first Fischmob in Polizei Osterei and two years later Fettes Brot in Da draussen. The song also appeared in TV ads, first in a campaign for Maggi instant ramen, and most recently in a spot for the dairy company Müllermilch. The version used in the dairy ad, sung by Mia-Sophie Wellenbrink and entitled Fruchtalarm (literally "fruit alert") even reached #17 in the German single charts in September 2005.

=== Racist and xenophobic implications ===
While many see the song as harmless anarchic absurdism, there are others who find the song (when viewed from a contemporary 21st century perspective) to be xenophobic and/or racist, due to its referring to the Chinese people, and there are reports of German children of East Asian descent being bullied and teased with the song.

== See also ==
- "Apples and Bananas"

== Notes ==
DVA numbers refer to the Deutsches Volksliedarchiv (German Archive of Folk Song)
