= The Georgians (British band) =

The Georgians were the solo band Nat Gonella founded on his departure from Lew Stone and his Orchestra in 1934. He had already experimented as a solo artist in small groups and with the American pianist Garland Wilson but this was the first band to carry Gonella's name. In 1935, the new group made its debut at the Newcastle Empire.

The band featured his brother Bruts on second trumpet, the South African Pat Smuts on tenor saxophone, Albert Torrance on alto sax, Harold "Baby" Hood on piano, Tiny Winters on string bass and Gonella's former employer Bob Dryden on drums.

They recorded extensively for the Parlophone label throughout the 1930s, scoring hits such as "Tiger Rag", "Nagasaki", "I Can't Dance I've Got Ants In My Pants", "How'm I Doing?" "The Sheik of Araby", "Oh Monah!", "Ol' Man Mose" and Gonella's signature tune "Georgia On My Mind". In these recordings, he brought jazz, and particularly the stylings of his hero Louis Armstrong, to national prominence through radio broadcasts and tours of the variety circuit. The Georgians were finally disbanded when Gonella was called into the service during World War II.

In the 1940s, Nat Gonella formed his New Georgians who featured an extended big band, but this group lacked the swing of the smaller 1930s band.
