= Rhythm and blues =

Music genre originating in the 1940s in the United States

- Stylistic origins: Jazz; blues; spirituals; gospel; boogie-woogie; jump blues; swing
- Cultural origins: 1940s, Deep South, United States
- Typical instruments: Double bass; guitar; drum kit; electric guitar; electric organ; Hammond organ; horns; piano; saxophone; bass guitar; vocals
- Derivative forms: Beach music; Beat music; Brill Building; disco; funk; hard bop; hip-hop; mod revival; post-disco; rock and roll; reggae; ska; smooth jazz; soul; zouk love; zydeco

Subgenres
- Alternative R&B; Christian R&B; contemporary R&B; doo-wop; quiet storm

Fusion genres
- Jazz fusion; Latin R&B; Minneapolis sound; neo soul; new jack swing; raï'n'B; rhythm & grime; various hip-hop fusions (see § Since the 1980s)

Local scenes
- Detroit; New Orleans; United Kingdom

Other topics
- Black gospel music; blue-eyed soul; brown-eyed soul; rare groove; slow jam; urban contemporary music

Rhythm and blues, frequently abbreviated as R&B or R'n'B, is a genre of popular music that originated within African American communities in the 1940s. The term was originally used by record companies to describe recordings marketed predominantly to African Americans, at a time when "rocking, jazz based music ... [with a] heavy, insistent beat" was starting to become more popular. In the commercial rhythm and blues music typical of the 1950s through the 1970s, the bands usually consisted of a piano, one or two guitars, bass, drums, one or more saxophones, and sometimes background vocalists. R&B lyrical themes often encapsulate the African American history and experience of pain and the quest for freedom and joy, as well as triumphs and failures in terms of societal racism, oppression, relationships, economics, and aspirations.

The term "rhythm and blues" has undergone a number of shifts in meaning. In the early 1950s, it was frequently applied to blues records. Starting in the mid-1950s, after this style of music had contributed to the development of rock and roll, the term "R&B" became used in a wider context. It referred to music styles that developed from and incorporated electric blues, as well as gospel and soul. By the 1970s, the term "rhythm and blues" had changed once again and was used as a blanket term for soul and funk.

In the late 1980s, a newer style of R&B developed, becoming known as "contemporary R&B". This contemporary form combines rhythm and blues with various elements of jazz, soul, funk, disco, blues and electronic.

== Etymology, definitions and description ==
Although Jerry Wexler of Billboard magazine is credited with coining the term "rhythm and blues" as a musical term in the United States in 1948, the term had been used in Billboard as early as 1943. However, the company's first list of songs popular among African Americans was named Harlem Hit Parade; created in 1942, it listed the "most popular records in Harlem," and is the predecessor to the Billboard RnB chart. "Rhythm and Blues" replaced the common term "race music", a term coined by Okeh producer Ralph Peer based on the common self description by the African American press as "people of race." The term "rhythm and blues" was then used by Billboard in its chart listings from June 1949 until August 1969, when its "Hot Rhythm & Blues Singles" chart was renamed as "Best Selling Soul Singles". Before the term "rhythm and Blues" was popularized, various record companies had already begun replacing the term "race music" with the term "sepia series". "Rhythm and blues" is often abbreviated as "R&B" or "R'n'B". In subsequent decades, the abbreviation "R&B" evolved to encompass a broad range of popular music styles, including soul, funk, disco, and later contemporary R&B, reflecting shifts in production, audience, and industry marketing.

In the early 1950s, the term "rhythm & blues" was frequently applied to blues records. American writer and producer Robert Palmer defined rhythm & blues as "a catchall term referring to any music that was made by and for black Americans". He has also used the term "R&B" as a synonym for jump blues. However, AllMusic separates it from jump blues because of R&B's stronger gospel influences. Lawrence Cohn, author of Nothing but the Blues, writes that "rhythm and blues" was an umbrella term invented for industry convenience. According to him, the term embraced all black music except classical music and religious music, unless a gospel song sold enough to break into the charts. Well into the 21st century, the term R&B continues in use (in some contexts) to categorize music made by black musicians, as distinct from styles of music made by other musicians.

In the commercial rhythm and blues music typical of the 1950s through the 1970s, the bands usually consisted of piano, one or two guitars, bass, drums, and saxophone. Arrangements were rehearsed to the point of effortlessness and were sometimes accompanied by background vocalists. Simple repetitive parts mesh, creating momentum and rhythmic interplay producing mellow, lilting, and often hypnotic textures while calling attention to no individual sound. While singers are emotionally engaged with the lyrics, often intensely so, they remain cool, relaxed, and in control. The bands dressed in suits, and even uniforms, a practice associated with the modern popular music that rhythm and blues performers aspired to dominate. Lyrics often seemed fatalistic, and the music typically followed predictable patterns of chords and structure. R&B lyrical themes often encapsulate the African-American experience of pain and the quest for freedom and joy, as well as triumphs and failures in terms of relationships, economics, and aspirations.

One publication of the Smithsonian Institution provided this summary of the origins of the genre in 2016.

"A distinctly African-American music drawing from the deep tributaries of African American expressive culture, it is an amalgam of jump blues, big band swing, gospel, boogie, and blues that was initially developed during a thirty-year period that bridges the era of legally sanctioned racial segregation, international conflicts, and the struggle for civil rights".

The Rock & Roll Hall of Fame defines some of the originators of R&B, including Joe Turner's big band, Louis Jordan's Tympany Five, James Brown and LaVern Baker. In fact, this source states that "Louis Jordan joined Turner in laying the foundation for R&B in the 1940s, cutting one swinging rhythm & blues masterpiece after another". Other artists who were "cornerstones of R&B and its transformation into rock & roll" include Etta James, Fats Domino, Roy Brown, Little Richard and Ruth Brown. The "doo wop" groups were also noteworthy, including the Orioles, the Ravens and the Dominoes.

The term "rock and roll" had a strong sexual connotation in jump blues and R&B, but when DJ Alan Freed referred to rock and roll on mainstream radio in the mid-1950s, "the sexual component had been dialed down enough that it simply became an acceptable term for dancing".

== History ==
=== Precursors ===
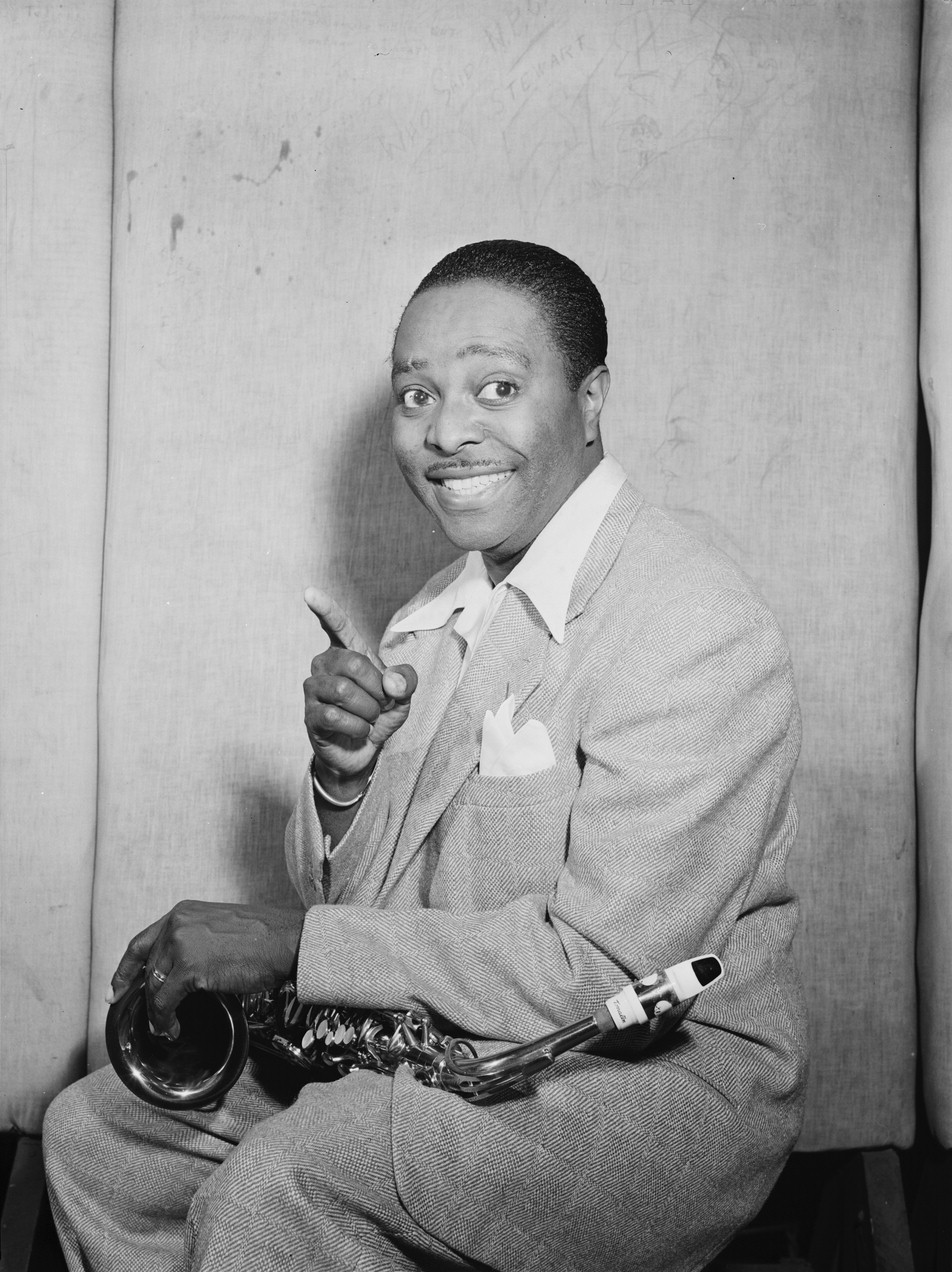
Louis Jordan in New York City, c. July 1946

The great migration of Black Americans to the urban industrial centers of Chicago, Detroit, New York City, Los Angeles, Washington, D.C. and elsewhere in the 1920s and 1930s created a new market for jazz, blues, and related genres of music. The migration of African Americans to urban centers in the 1920s and 1930s helped shape rhythm and blues by blending jazz, blues, and urban influences. These genres of music were often performed by full-time musicians, either working alone or in small groups. The precursors of rhythm and blues came from jazz and blues, which overlapped in the late-1920s and 30s through the work of musicians such as the Harlem Hamfats, with their 1936 hit "Oh Red", as well as Lonnie Johnson, Leroy Carr, Cab Calloway, Count Basie, and T-Bone Walker. There was also increasing emphasis on the electric guitar as a lead instrument, as well as the piano and saxophone.

=== Late 1940s ===
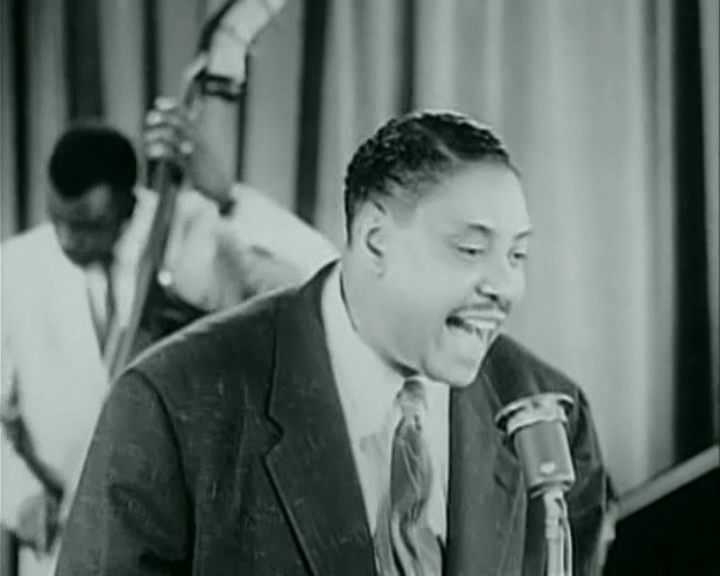
Big Joe Turner was a key figure in early R&B, blending blues and rock.

R&B originated in African-American communities in the 1940s. In 1948, RCA Victor was marketing black music under the name "Blues and Rhythm". In that year, Louis Jordan dominated the top five listings of the R&B charts with three songs, and two of the top five songs were based on the boogie-woogie rhythms that had come to prominence during the 1940s. Jordan's band, the Tympany Five (formed in 1938), consisted of him on saxophone and vocals, along with musicians on trumpet, tenor saxophone, piano, bass and drums. Lawrence Cohn described the music as "grittier than his boogie-era jazz-tinged blues". Author Robert Palmer described it as "urbane, rocking, jazz-based music ... [with a] heavy, insistent beat". Jordan's music, along with that of Big Joe Turner, Roy Brown, Billy Wright, and Wynonie Harris, before 1949, was referred to as jump blues. Then, Paul Gayten, Roy Brown, and others had had hits in the style now referred to as rhythm and blues. In 1948, Wynonie Harris's remake of Brown's 1947 recording "Good Rockin' Tonight" reached number two on the charts, following band leader Sonny Thompson's "Long Gone" at number one.

In 1949, the term "Rhythm and Blues" (R&B) replaced the Billboard category Harlem Hit Parade. Also in that year, "The Huckle-Buck", recorded by band leader and saxophonist Paul Williams, was the number one R&B tune, remaining on top of the charts for nearly the entire year. Written by musician and arranger Andy Gibson, the song was described as a "dirty boogie" because it was risque and raunchy. Paul Williams and His Hucklebuckers' concerts were sweaty riotous affairs that got shut down on more than one occasion. Their lyrics, by Roy Alfred (who later co-wrote the 1955 hit "(The) Rock and Roll Waltz"), were mildly sexually suggestive, and one teenager from Philadelphia said "That Hucklebuck was a very nasty dance". Also in 1949, a new version of a 1920s blues song, "Ain't Nobody's Business" was a number four hit for Jimmy Witherspoon, and Louis Jordan and the Tympany Five once again made the top five with "Saturday Night Fish Fry". Many of these hit records were issued on new independent record labels, such as Savoy (founded 1942), King (founded 1943), Imperial (founded 1945), Specialty (founded 1946), Chess (founded 1947), and Atlantic (founded 1948).

=== Afro-Cuban rhythmic influence ===
African American music began incorporating Afro-Cuban rhythmic motifs in the 1800s with the popularity of the Cuban contradanza (known outside of Cuba as the habanera). The habanera rhythm can be thought of as a combination of tresillo and the backbeat.

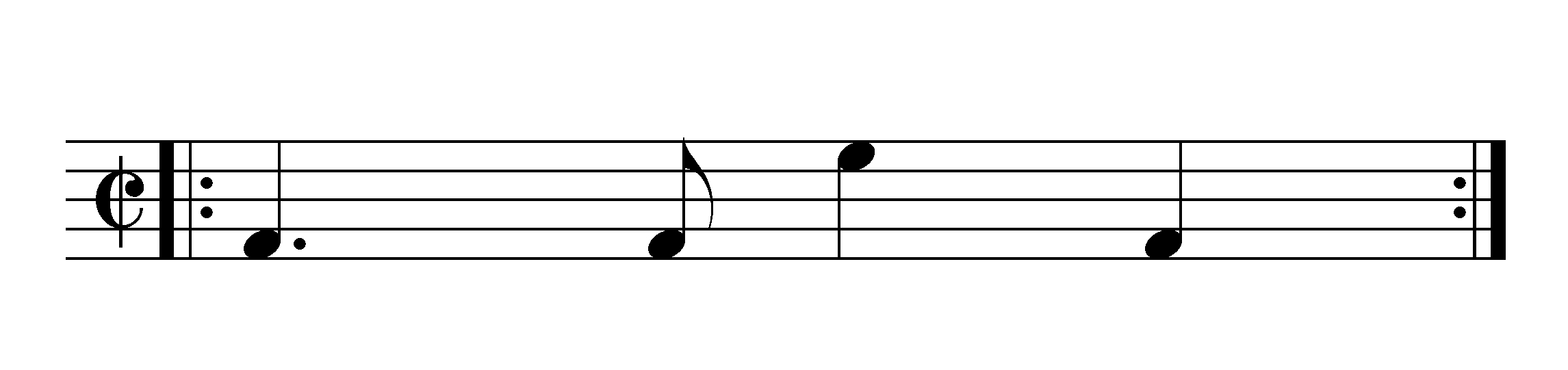
The habanera rhythm shown as tresillo (lower notes) with the backbeat (upper note)

For the more than a quarter-century in which the cakewalk, ragtime and proto-jazz were forming and developing, the Cuban genre habanera exerted a constant presence in African American popular music. Jazz pioneer Jelly Roll Morton considered the tresillo/habanera rhythm (which he called the Spanish tinge) to be an essential ingredient of jazz. There are examples of tresillo-like rhythms in some African American folk music such as the hand-clapping and foot-stomping patterns in ring shout, post-Civil War drum and fife music, and New Orleans second line music. Wynton Marsalis considers tresillo to be the New Orleans "clave" (although technically, the pattern is only half a clave). Tresillo is the most basic duple-pulse rhythmic cell in Sub-Saharan African music traditions, and its use in African American music is one of the clearest examples of African rhythmic retention in the United States. The use of tresillo was continuously reinforced by the consecutive waves of Cuban music, which were adopted into North American popular culture. In 1940 Bob Zurke released "Rhumboogie", a boogie-woogie with a tresillo bass line, and lyrics proudly declaring the adoption of Cuban rhythm:

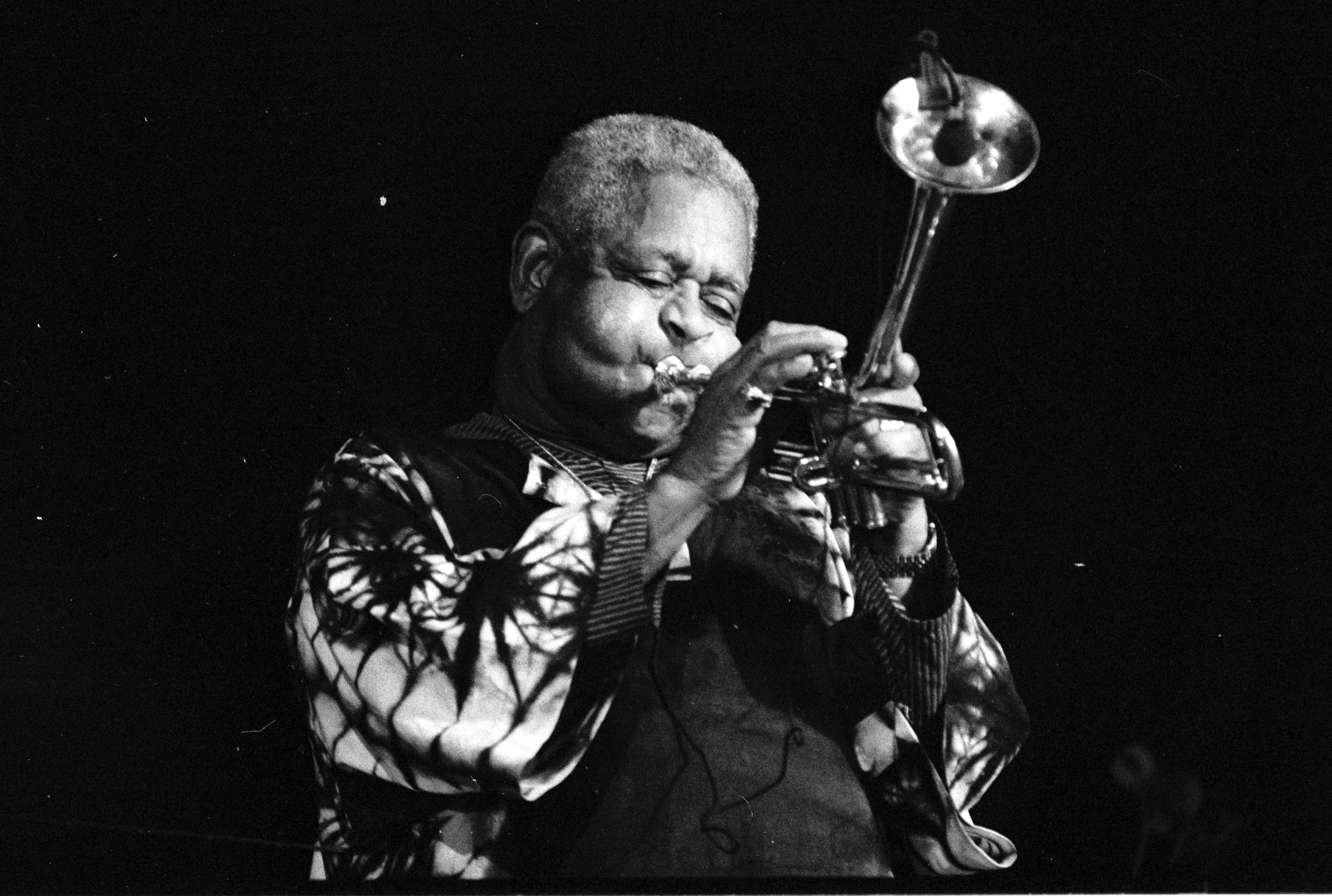
Dizzy Gillespie was instrumental in blending Afro-Cuban rhythms with jazz.

Harlem's got a new rhythm, man it's burning up the dance floors because it's so hot! They took a little rhumba rhythm and added boogie-woogie and now look what they got! Rhumboogie, it's Harlem's new creation with the Cuban syncopation, it's the killer! Just plant your both feet on each side. Let both your hips and shoulder glide. Then throw your body back and ride. There's nothing like rhumbaoogie, rhumboogie, boogie-woogie. In Harlem or Havana, you can kiss the old Savannah. It's a killer!

Although originating in the metropolis at the mouth of the Mississippi River, New Orleans blues, with its Afro-Caribbean rhythmic traits, is distinct from the sound of the Mississippi Delta blues. In the late 1940s, New Orleans musicians were especially receptive to Cuban influences precisely at the time when R&B was first forming. The first use of tresillo in R&B occurred in New Orleans. British singer Robert Palmer, who sampled R&B on his album Don't Explain, recalls:

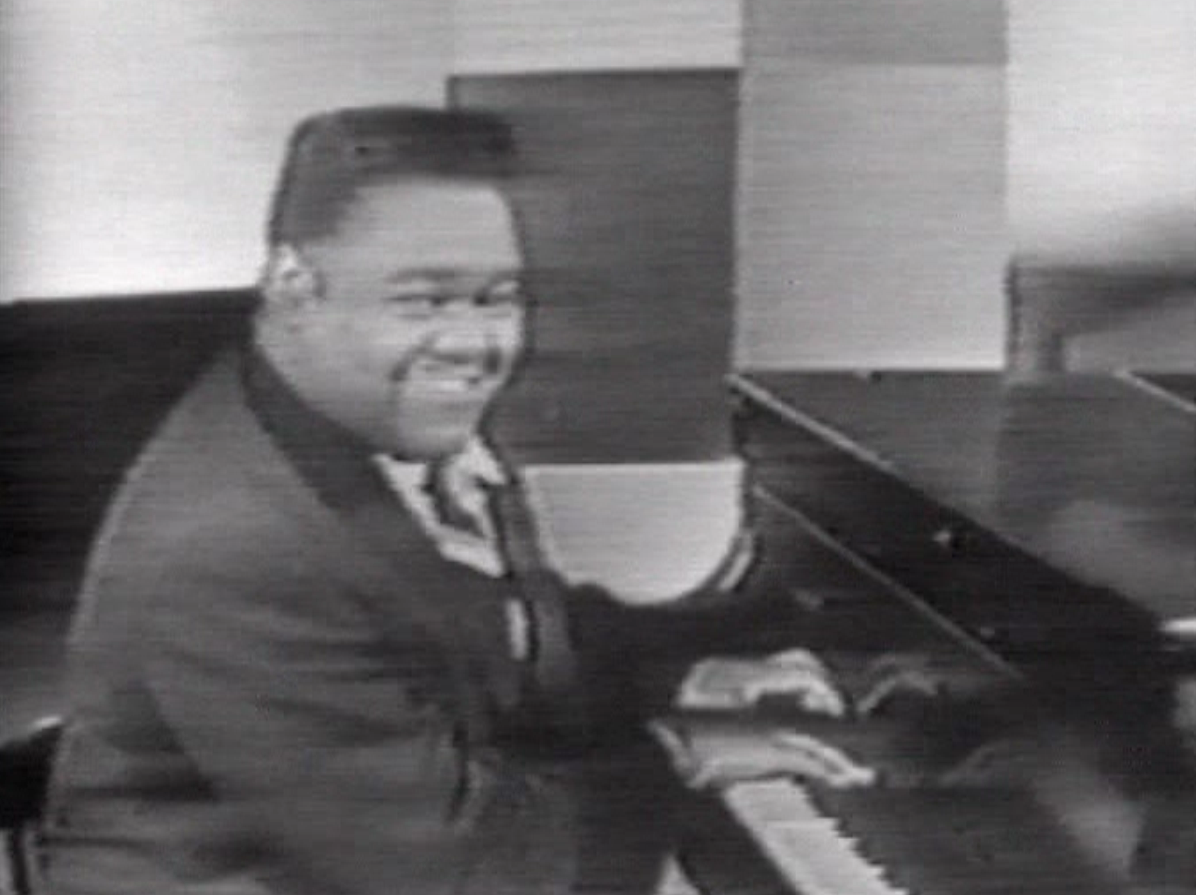
Fats Domino in 1956

New Orleans producer-bandleader Dave Bartholomew first employed this figure (as a saxophone-section riff) on his own 1949 disc "Country Boy" and subsequently helped make it the most over-used rhythmic pattern in 1950s rock 'n' roll. On numerous recordings by Fats Domino, Little Richard and others, Bartholomew assigned this repeating three-note pattern not just to the string bass, but also to electric guitars and even baritone sax, making for a very heavy bottom. He recalls first hearing the figure – as a bass pattern on a Cuban disc.

In a 1988 interview, Bartholomew (who had the first R&B studio band), revealed how he initially superimposed tresillo over swing rhythm:

I heard the bass playing that part on a 'rumba' record. On 'Country Boy' I had my bass and drums playing a straight swing rhythm and wrote out that 'rumba' bass part for the saxes to play on top of the swing rhythm. Later, especially after rock 'n' roll came along, I made the 'rumba' bass part heavier and heavier. I'd have the string bass, an electric guitar and a baritone all in unison.

Bartholomew referred to the Cuban son by the misnomer rumba, a common practice of that time. Fats Domino's "Blue Monday", produced by Bartholomew, is another example of this now classic use of tresillo in R&B. Bartholomew's 1949 tresillo-based "Oh Cubanas" is an attempt to blend African American and Afro-Cuban music. The word mambo, larger than any of the other text, is placed prominently on the record label. In his composition "Misery", New Orleans pianist Professor Longhair plays a habanera-like figure in his left hand. The deft use of triplets is a characteristic of Longhair's style.

Gerhard Kubik notes that with the exception of New Orleans, early blues lacked complex polyrhythms, and there was a "very specific absence of asymmetric time-line patterns (key patterns) in virtually all early-twentieth-century African-American music ... only in some New Orleans genres does a hint of simple time line patterns occasionally appear in the form of transient so-called 'stomp' patterns or stop-time chorus. These do not function in the same way as African timelines." In the late 1940s, this changed somewhat when the two-celled timeline structure was brought into the blues. New Orleans musicians such as Bartholomew and Longhair incorporated Cuban instruments, as well as the clave pattern and related two-celled figures in songs such as "Carnival Day", (Bartholomew 1949) and "Mardi Gras In New Orleans" (Longhair 1949). While some of these early experiments were awkward fusions, the Afro-Cuban elements were eventually integrated fully into the New Orleans sound.

In the 1940s, Professor Longhair listened to and played with musicians from the islands and "fell under the spell of Perez Prado's mambo records." He was especially enamored with Afro-Cuban music. Michael Campbell states: "Professor Longhair's influence was ... far-reaching. In several of his early recordings, Professor Longhair blended Afro-Cuban rhythms with rhythm and blues. The most explicit is 'Longhair's Blues Rhumba,' where he overlays a straightforward blues with a clave rhythm." Longhair's particular style was known locally as rumba-boogie. In his "Mardi Gras in New Orleans", the pianist employs the 2–3 clave onbeat/offbeat motif in a rumba boogie "guajeo".

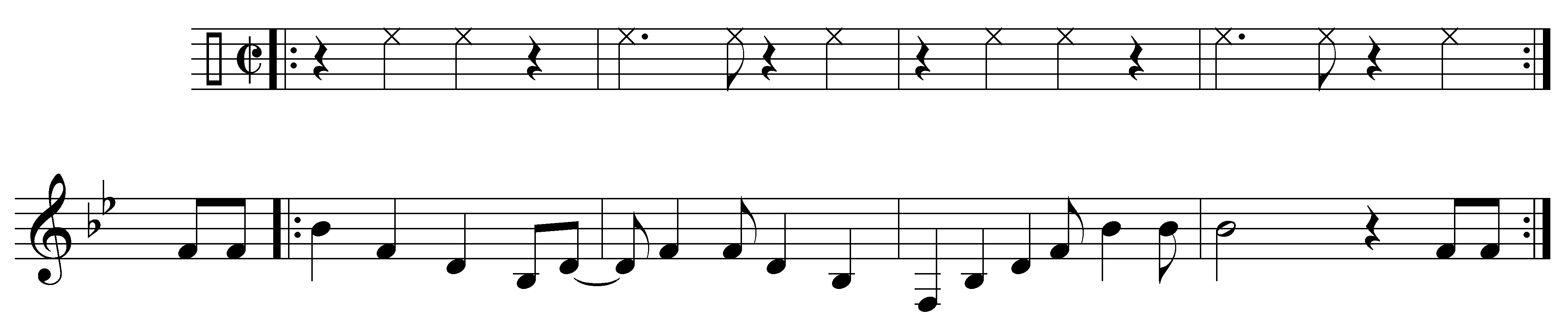
Piano excerpt from the rumba boogie "Mardi Gras in New Orleans" (1949) by Professor Longhair. 2–3 claves are written above for rhythmic reference.

The syncopated, but straight subdivision feel of Cuban music (as opposed to swung subdivisions) took root in New Orleans R&B during this time. Alexander Stewart states that the popular feel was passed along from "New Orleans—through James Brown's music, to the popular music of the 1970s," adding: "The singular style of rhythm & blues that emerged from New Orleans in the years after World War II played an important role in the development of funk. In a related development, the underlying rhythms of American popular music underwent a basic, yet generally unacknowledged transition from a triplet or shuffle feel to even or straight eighth notes. Concerning the various funk motifs, Stewart states that this model "is different from a time line (such as clave and tresillo) in that it is not an exact pattern, but more of a loose organizing principle."

Johnny Otis released the R&B mambo "Mambo Boogie" in January 1951, featuring congas, maracas, claves, and mambo saxophone guajeos in a blues progression. Ike Turner recorded "Cubano Jump" (1954) an electric guitar instrumental, which is built around several 2–3 clave figures, adopted from the mambo. The Hawketts, in "Mardi Gras Mambo" (1955) (featuring the vocals of a young Art Neville), make a clear reference to Perez Prado in their use of his trademark "Unhh!" in the break after the introduction.

Ned Sublette states: "The electric blues cats were very well aware of Latin music, and there was definitely such a thing as rhumba blues; you can hear Muddy Waters and Howlin' Wolf playing it." He also cites Otis Rush, Ike Turner and Ray Charles, as R&B artists who employed this feel.

The use of clave in R&B coincided with the growing dominance of the backbeat, and the rising popularity of Cuban music in the U.S. In a sense, clave can be distilled down to tresillo (three-side) answered by the backbeat (two-side).

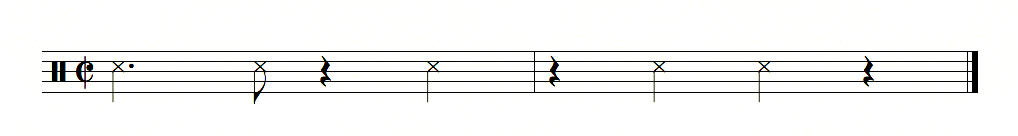
3–2 clave written in two measures in cut-time

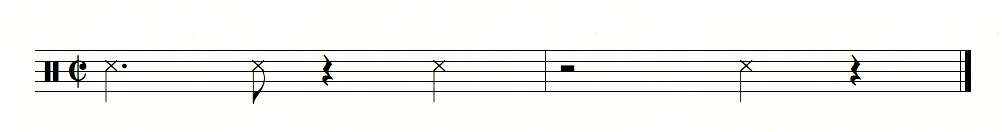
Tresillo answered by the backbeat, the essence of clave in African American music

The "Bo Diddley beat" (1955) is perhaps the first true fusion of 3–2 clave and R&B/rock 'n' roll. Bo Diddley has given different accounts of the riff's origins. Sublette asserts: "In the context of the time, and especially those maracas [heard on the record], 'Bo Diddley' has to be understood as a Latin-tinged record. A rejected cut recorded at the same session was titled only 'Rhumba' on the track sheets." Johnny Otis's "Willie and the Hand Jive" (1958) is another example of this successful blend of 3–2 claves and R&B. Otis used the Cuban instruments claves and maracas on the song.

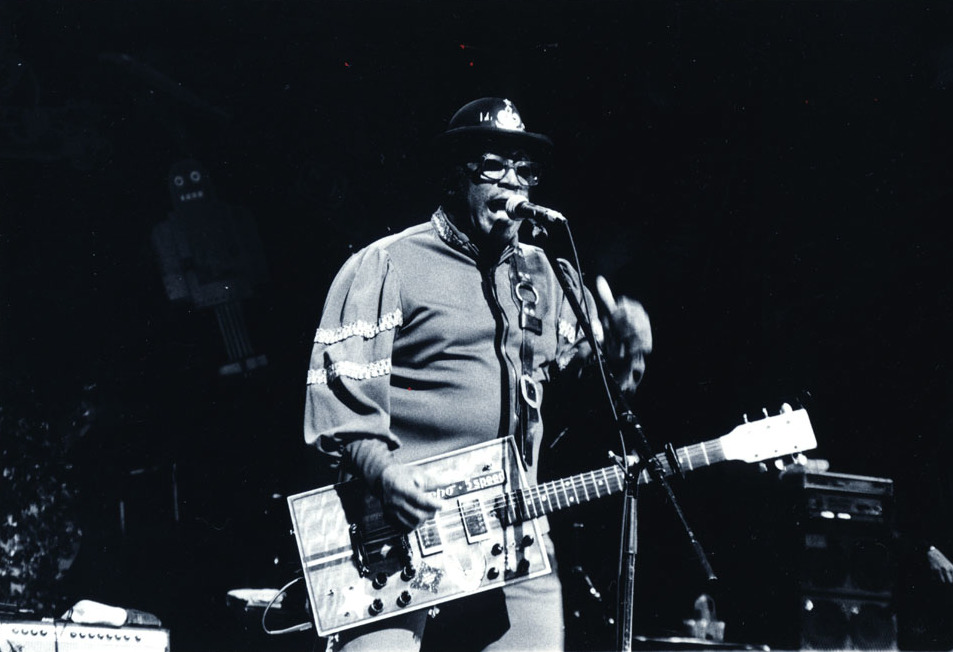
Bo Diddley's "Bo Diddley beat" is a clave-based motif.

Afro-Cuban music was the conduit by which African American music was "re-Africanized", through the adoption of two-celled figures like clave and Afro-Cuban instruments like the conga drum, bongos, maracas and claves. According to John Storm Roberts, R&B became the vehicle for the return of Cuban elements into mass popular music. Ahmet Ertegun, producer for Atlantic Records, is reported to have said that "Afro-Cuban rhythms added color and excitement to the basic drive of R&B." As Ned Sublette points out though: "By the 1960s, with Cuba the object of a United States embargo that still remains in effect today, the island nation had been forgotten as a source of music. By the time people began to talk about rock and roll as having a history, Cuban music had vanished from North American consciousness."

=== Early to mid-1950s ===
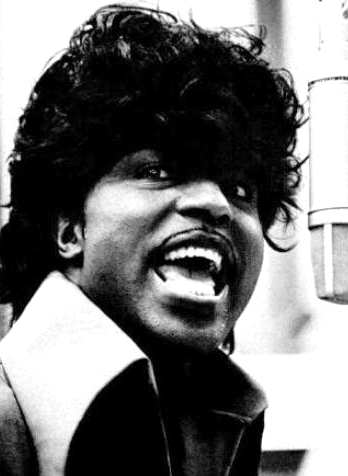
Little Richard in 1967

At first, only African Americans were buying R&B discs. According to Jerry Wexler of Atlantic Records, sales were localized in African-American markets; there were no white sales or white radio play. During the early 1950s, more white teenagers started to become aware of R&B and began purchasing the music. For example, 40% of 1952 sales at Dolphin's of Hollywood record shop, located in an African-American area of Los Angeles, were to whites. Eventually, white teens across the country turned their musical taste toward rhythm and blues.

Johnny Otis, who had signed with the Newark, New Jersey–based Savoy Records, produced many R&B hits in 1951, including "Double Crossing Blues", "Mistrustin' Blues" and "Cupid's Boogie", all of which hit number one that year. Otis scored ten top ten hits that year. Other hits include "Gee Baby", "Mambo Boogie" and "All Nite Long". The Clovers, a quintet consisting of a vocal quartet with accompanying guitarist, sang a distinctive-sounding combination of blues and gospel. They had the number five hit of the year with "Don't You Know I Love You" on Atlantic. Also in July 1951, Cleveland, Ohio DJ Alan Freed started a late-night radio show called "The Moondog Rock Roll House Party" on WJW (850 AM). Freed's show was sponsored by Fred Mintz, whose R&B record store had a primarily African-American clientele. Freed began referring to the rhythm and blues music he played as "rock and roll".

In 1951 Little Richard Penniman began recording for RCA Records in the jump blues style of late 1940s stars Roy Brown and Billy Wright. However, it was not until he recorded a demo in 1954 that caught the attention of Specialty Records that the world would start to hear his new uptempo funky rhythm and blues that would catapult him to fame in 1955 and help define the sound of rock 'n' roll. A rapid succession of rhythm and blues hits followed, beginning with "Tutti Frutti" and "Long Tall Sally", which would influence performers such as James Brown, Elvis Presley, and Otis Redding.

Also in 1951, the song Rocket 88 was recorded by Ike Turner and his Kings of Rhythm at a studio owned by Sam Phillips with the vocal by Jackie Brenston. This song is often cited as a precursor to rock and roll or as one of the first records in that genre. In a later interview, however, Ike Turner offered this comment: "I don't think that 'Rocket 88' is rock 'n' roll. I think that 'Rocket 88' is R&B, but I think 'Rocket 88' is the cause of rock and roll existing".

Ruth Brown, performing on the Atlantic label, placed hits in the top five every year from 1951 through 1954: "Teardrops from My Eyes", "Five, Ten, Fifteen Hours", "(Mama) He Treats Your Daughter Mean" and "What a Dream". Faye Adams's "Shake a Hand" made it to number two in 1952. In 1953, the R&B record-buying public made Big Mama Thornton's original recording of Leiber and Stoller's "Hound Dog" the year's number three hit. Ruth Brown was very prominent among female R&B stars; her popularity most likely came from "her deeply rooted vocal delivery in African American tradition". That same year The Orioles, a doo-wop group, had the number four hit of the year with "Crying in the Chapel".

Fats Domino made the top 30 of the pop charts in 1952 and 1953, then the top 10 with "Ain't That a Shame". Ray Charles came to national prominence in 1955 with "I Got a Woman". Big Bill Broonzy said of Charles's music: "He's mixing the blues with the spirituals ... I know that's wrong."

In 1954 the Chords' "Sh-Boom" became the first hit to cross over from the R&B chart to hit the top 10 early in the year. Late in the year, and into 1955, "Hearts of Stone" by the Charms made the top 20.

At Chess Records in the spring of 1955, Bo Diddley's debut record "Bo Diddley"/"I'm a Man" climbed to number two on the R&B charts and popularized Bo Diddley's own original rhythm and blues clave-based vamp that would become a mainstay in rock and roll.

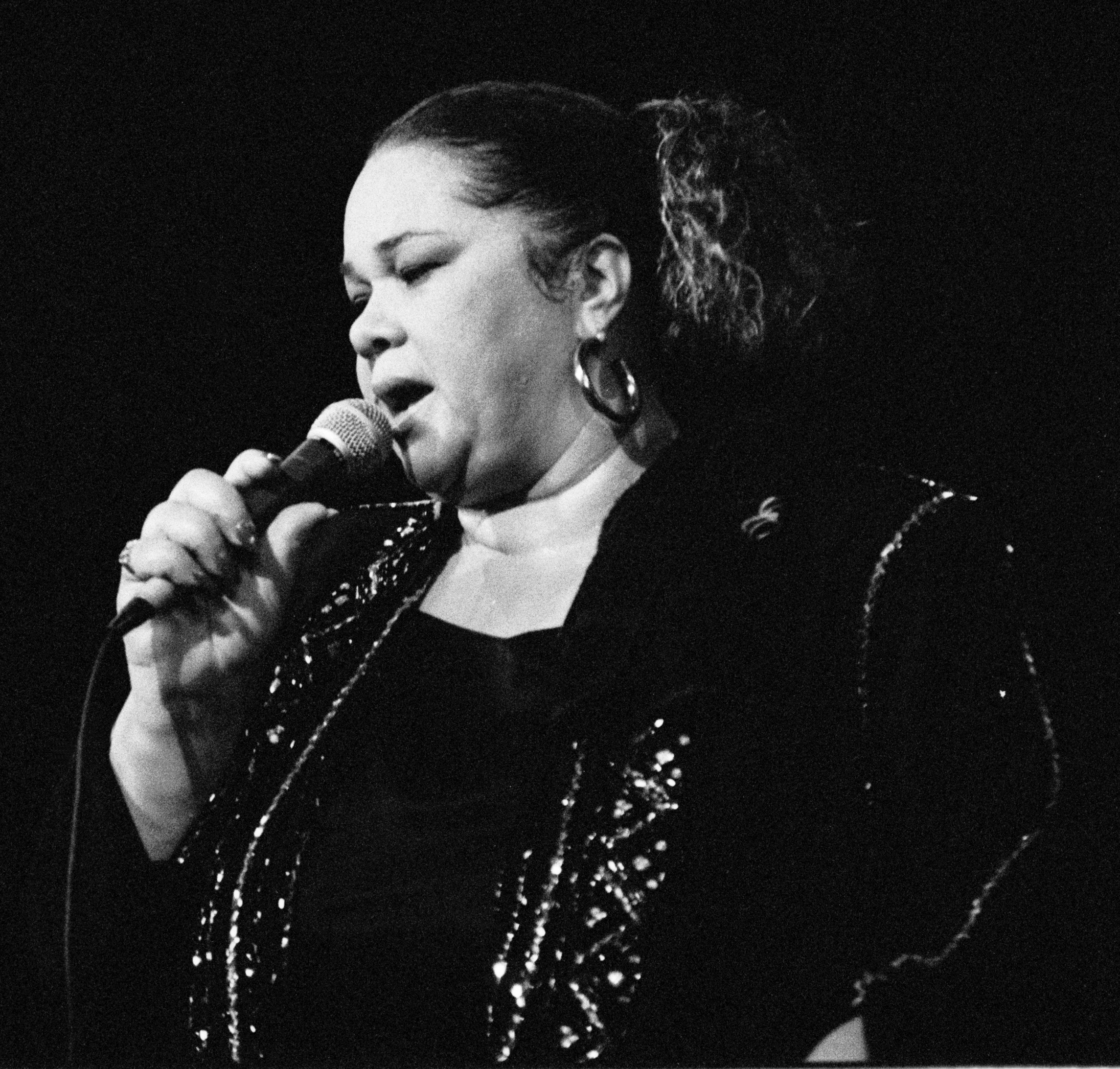
Etta James blended blues, R&B, and gospel influences.

At the urging of Leonard Chess at Chess Records, Chuck Berry reworked a country fiddle tune with a long history, entitled "Ida Red". The resulting "Maybellene" was not only a number three hit on the R&B charts in 1955, but also reached into the top 30 on the pop charts. Alan Freed, who had moved to the much larger market of New York City in 1954, helped the record become popular with white teenagers. Freed had been given part of the writing credit by Chess in return for his promotional activities, a common practice at the time.

R&B was also a strong influence on rock and roll. A 1985 article in The Wall Street Journal, titled, "Rock! It's Still Rhythm and Blues" reported that the "two terms were used interchangeably" until about 1957. The other sources quoted in the article said that rock and roll combined R&B with pop and country music.

Fats Domino was not convinced that there was any new genre. In 1957, he said, "What they call rock 'n' roll now is rhythm and blues. I've been playing it for 15 years in New Orleans". According to Rolling Stone, "this is a valid statement ... all Fifties rockers, black and white, country born and city bred, were fundamentally influenced by R&B, the black popular music of the late Forties and early Fifties".

=== Late 1950s ===
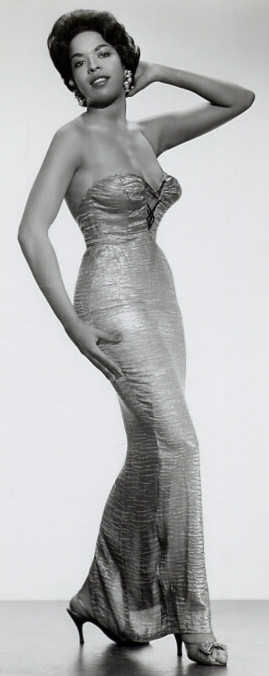
Della Reese

In 1956, an R&B "Top Stars of '56" tour took place, with headliners Al Hibbler, Frankie Lymon and the Teenagers, and Carl Perkins, whose "Blue Suede Shoes" was very popular with R&B music buyers. Some of the performers completing the bill were Chuck Berry, Cathy Carr, Shirley & Lee, Della Reese, Sam "T-Bird" Jensen, the Cleftones, and the Spaniels with Illinois Jacquet's Big Rockin' Rhythm Band. Cities visited by the tour included Columbia, South Carolina; Annapolis, Maryland; Pittsburgh, Pennsylvania; Syracuse, Rochester and Buffalo, New York; and other cities. In Columbia, the concert ended with a near riot as Perkins began his first song as the closing act. Perkins is quoted as saying, "It was dangerous. Lot of kids got hurt". In Annapolis, 50,000 to 70,000 people tried to attend a sold-out performance with 8,000 seats. Roads were clogged for seven hours. Filmmakers took advantage of the popularity of "rhythm and blues" musicians as "rock n roll" musicians beginning in 1956. Little Richard, Chuck Berry, Fats Domino, Big Joe Turner, the Treniers, the Platters, and the Flamingos all made it onto the big screen.

Two Elvis Presley records made the R&B top five in 1957: "Jailhouse Rock"/"Treat Me Nice" at number one, and "All Shook Up" at number five, an unprecedented acceptance of a non-African American artist into a music category known for being created by blacks. Nat King Cole, also a jazz pianist who had two hits on the pop charts in the early 1950s ("Mona Lisa" at number two in 1950 and "Too Young" at number one in 1951), had a record in the top five in the R&B charts in 1958, "Looking Back"/"Do I Like It".

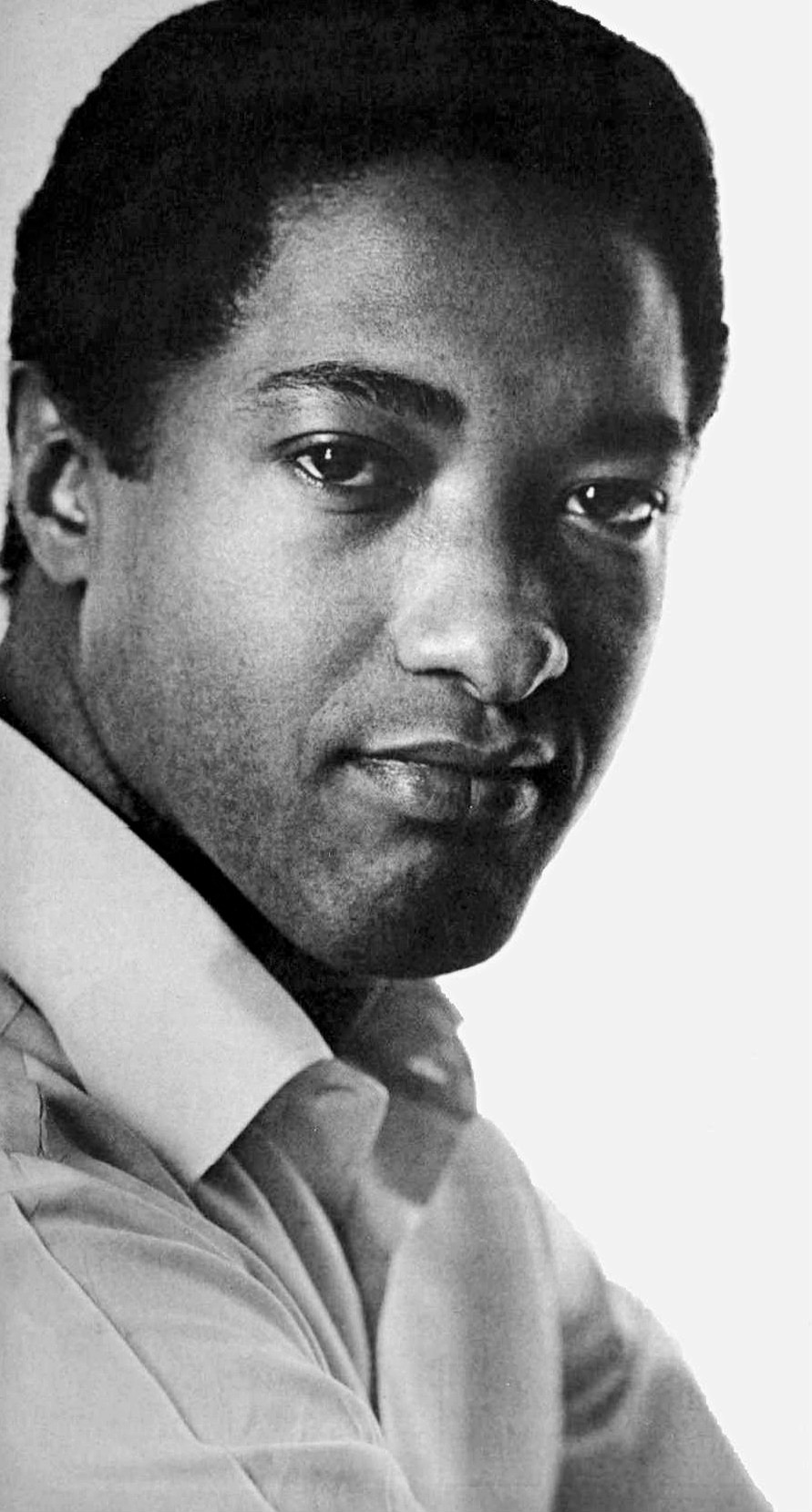
Sam Cooke

In 1959, two black-owned record labels, one of which would become hugely successful, made their debut: Sam Cooke's Sar and Berry Gordy's Motown Records. Brook Benton was at the top of the R&B charts in 1959 and 1960 with one number one and two number two hits. Benton had a certain warmth in his voice that attracted a wide variety of listeners, and his ballads led to comparisons with performers such as Nat King Cole, Frank Sinatra and Tony Bennett. Lloyd Price, who in 1952 had a number one hit with "Lawdy Miss Clawdy", regained predominance with a version of "Stagger Lee" at number one and "Personality" at number five in 1959.

The white bandleader of the Bill Black Combo, Bill Black, who had helped start Elvis Presley's career and was Elvis's bassist in the 1950s, had a hit among black listeners with "Smokie, Part 2". The single reached number 17 on the U.S. pop charts and number 1 on the R&B charts, selling over one million copies, and was awarded a gold disc by the RIAA. Hi Records did not feature pictures of the Combo on early records.

=== 1960s–1970s ===
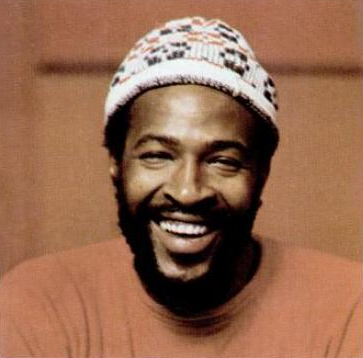
Marvin Gaye is a R&B artist known for his smooth voice.

Sam Cooke's number five hit "Chain Gang" is indicative of R&B in 1960, as is pop rocker Chubby Checker's number five hit "The Twist". By the early 1960s, the music industry category previously known as rhythm and blues was being called soul music, and similar music by white artists was labeled blue-eyed soul. Motown Records had its first million-selling single in 1960 with the Miracles' "Shop Around", and in 1961, Stax Records had its first hit with Carla Thomas's "Gee Whiz (Look at His Eyes)". Stax's next major hit, the Mar-Keys' instrumental "Last Night" (also released in 1961), introduced the rawer Memphis soul sound for which Stax became known. In Jamaica, R&B influenced the development of ska. In 1969, black culture and rhythm and blues reached another great achievement when the Grammys added the Rhythm and Blues category, giving academic recognition to the category.

By the 1970s, the term "rhythm and blues" was being used as a blanket term for soul, funk, and disco.

=== Since the 1980s ===
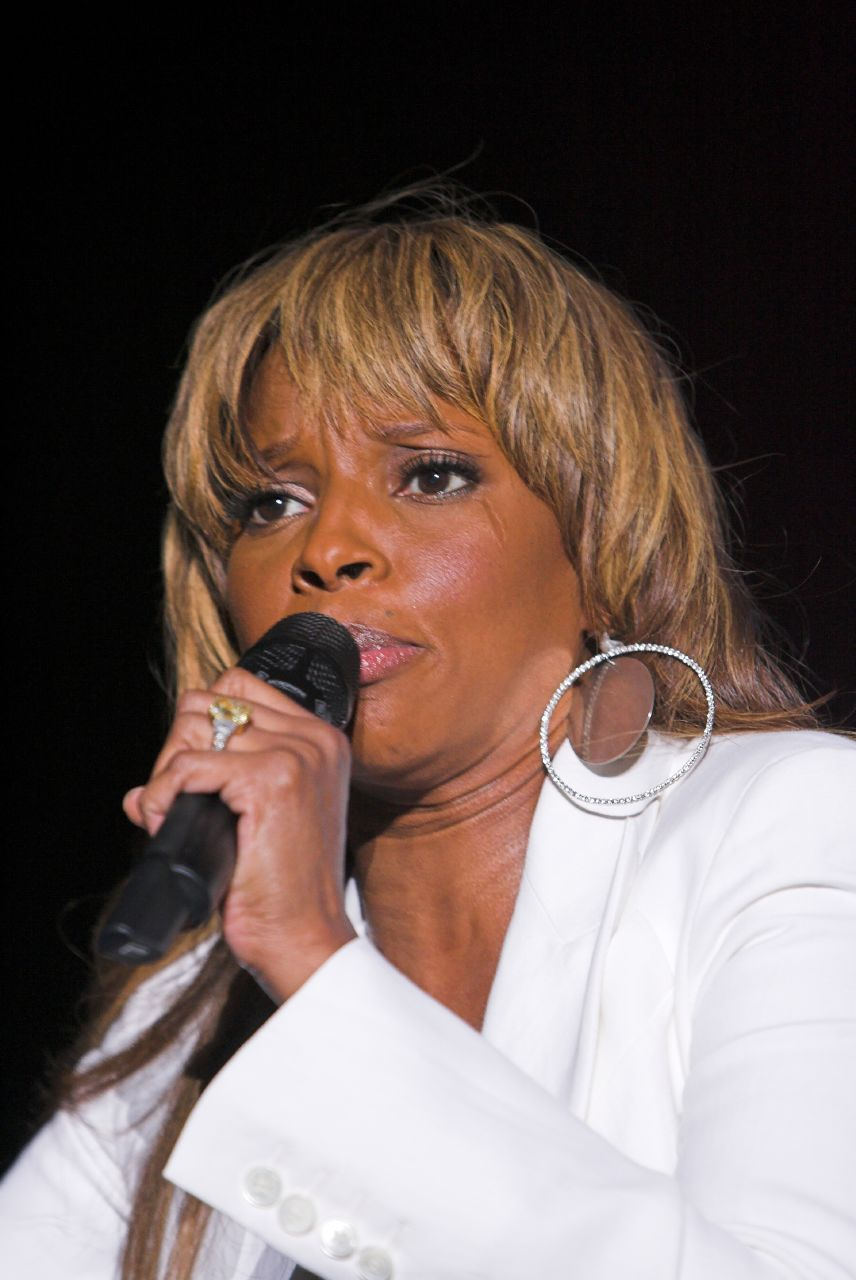
Mary J. Blige blended R&B with hip-hop influences, helping to shape the sound of the '90s.

In the late 1980s and early 1990s, hip-hop started to capture the imagination of America's youth. R&B started to become homogenized, with a group of high-profile producers responsible for most R&B hits. It was hard for R&B artists of the era to sell their music or even have their music heard because of the rise of hip-hop, but some adopted a "hip-hop" image, were marketed as such, and often featured rappers on their songs. Teddy Riley, Guy, Keith Sweat and Today gained new jack swing hits. In 1990, Billboard reintroduced R&B to categorize all of Black popular music other than hip-hop. Newer artists such as Usher, R. Kelly, Janet Jackson, TLC, Aaliyah, Brandy, Destiny's Child, Tevin Campbell and Mary J. Blige enjoyed success. L.A. Reid, the CEO of LaFace Records, was responsible for some of R&B's greatest successes in the 1990s in the form of Usher, TLC and Toni Braxton. Later, Reid successfully marketed Boyz II Men. In 2004, 80% of the songs that topped the R&B charts were also at the top of the Hot 100. That period was the all-time peak for R&B and hip hop on the Billboard Hot 100 and on Top 40 Radio. From about 2005 to 2013, R&B sales declined. However, since 2010, hip-hop has started to take cues from the R&B sound, choosing to adopt a softer, smoother sound that incorporates traditional R&B with rappers such as Drake, who has opened an entire new door for the genre. This sound has gained in popularity and created great controversy for both hip-hop and R&B as to how to identify it. In 2010, the National Rhythm & Blues Hall of Fame was founded by LaMont "ShowBoat" Robinson.

== Jewish influence in the business end of rhythm and blues ==
According to the Jewish writer, music publishing executive, and songwriter Arnold Shaw, during the 1940s in the US, there was generally little opportunity for Jews in the WASP-controlled realm of mass communications, but the music business was as "wide open for Jews as it was for blacks". Jews played a key role in developing and popularizing African American music, including rhythm and blues, and the independent record business was dominated by young Jewish men who promoted the sounds of black music.

For example, Milt Gabler was born to Jewish immigrants and grew up in Harlem. In the late 1930s, he created his own record label, Commodore Records, primarily recording, producing and promoting black singers and groups. Gabler recorded many of the leading jazz artists of the day. In 1939, he released the Billie Holiday hit song "Strange Fruit" on Commodore, boosting her career with what Time magazine 60 years later named 'Best Song of the Century'. Based on the success of Commodore, the major label Decca Records recruited and hired Gabler in 1941. His Jewish brother-in-law, Jack Crystal, (father of Billy Crystal), took over Commodore.

At Decca, Gabler worked with many of the biggest stars of the 1940s, producing a series of hits, as well as being the first to bring Louis Armstrong and Ella Fitzgerald together on record. Decca then placed him in charge of their subsidiary label Coral, where he continued to advance the careers of black musicians including the Ink Spots, Sammy Davis Jr. and Louis Jordan.

Gabler was responsible for many innovations in the recording industry of the 20th century. These included being the first person to deal in record reissues, the first to sell records by mail order, and the first to credit all the musicians on the recordings. In 1991, Gabler received the Grammy Trustees Award from The Recording Academy, for his significant contributions to the field of recording. In 1993, he was inducted into the Rock and Roll Hall of Fame by his nephew Billy Crystal.

== British rhythm and blues ==
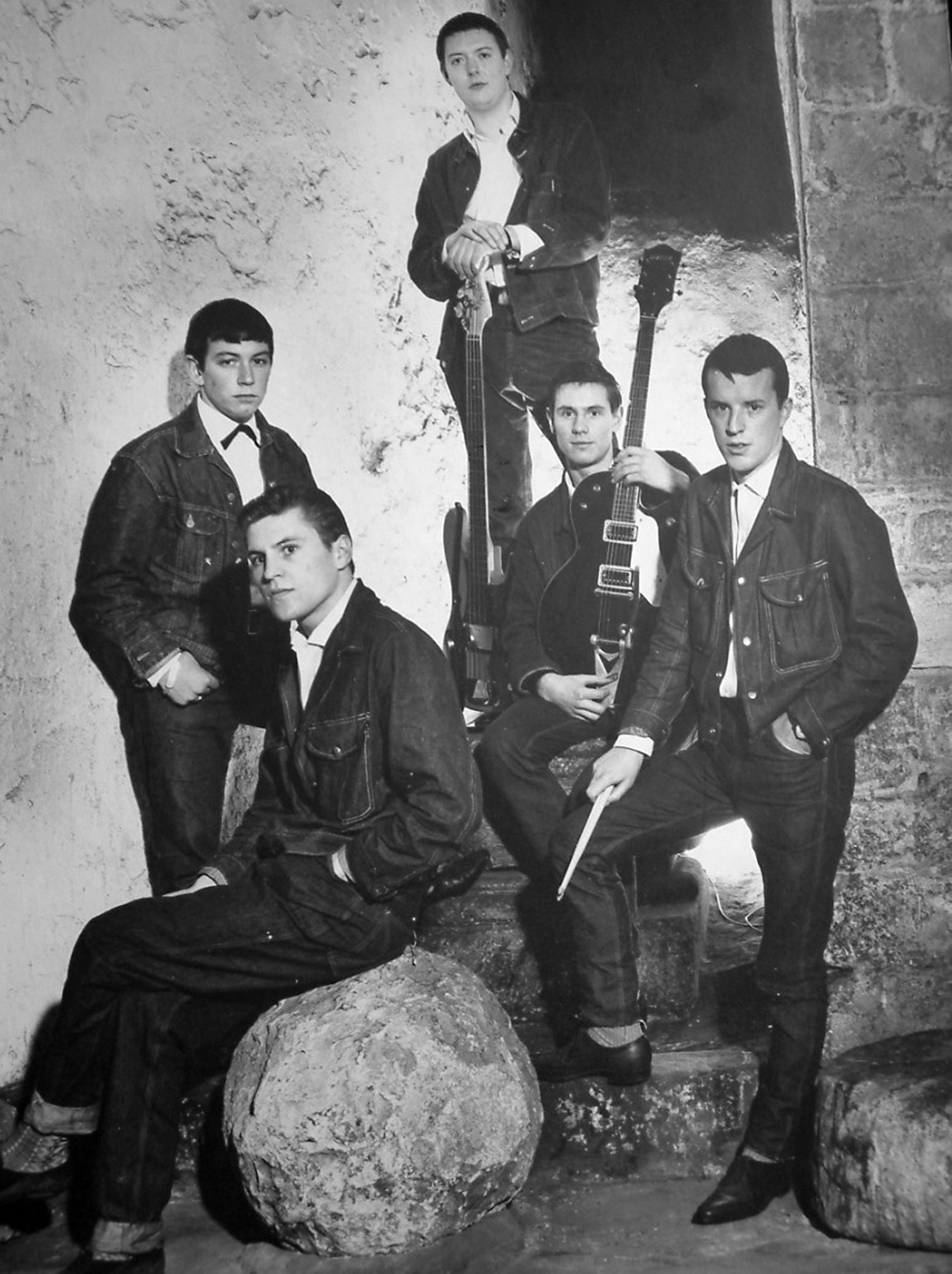
Eric Burdon & the Animals (1964)

British rhythm and blues and blues rock developed in the early 1960s, largely as a response to the recordings of American artists, often brought over by African American servicemen stationed in Britain or seamen visiting ports such as London, Liverpool, Newcastle and Belfast. Many bands, particularly in the developing London club scene, tried to emulate black rhythm and blues performers, resulting in a "rawer" or "grittier" sound than the more popular "beat groups". During the 1960s, Geno Washington, the Foundations, and the Equals gained pop hits. Many British black musicians helped form the British R&B scene. These included Geno Washington, an American singer stationed in England with the Air Force. He was invited to join what became Geno Washington & the Ram Jam Band by guitarist Pete Gage in 1965 and enjoyed top 40 hit singles and two top 10 albums before the band split up in 1969. Another American GI, Jimmy James, born in Jamaica, moved to London after two local number one hits in 1960 with The Vagabonds, who built a strong reputation as a live act. They released a live album and their studio debut, The New Religion, in 1966 and achieved moderate success with a few singles before the original Vagabonds broke up in 1970. White blues rock musician Alexis Korner formed new jazz rock band CCS in 1970. Interest in the blues would influence major British rock musicians, including Eric Clapton, Mick Taylor, Peter Green, and John Mayall, the groups Free and Cream adopted an interest in a wider range of rhythm and blues styles.

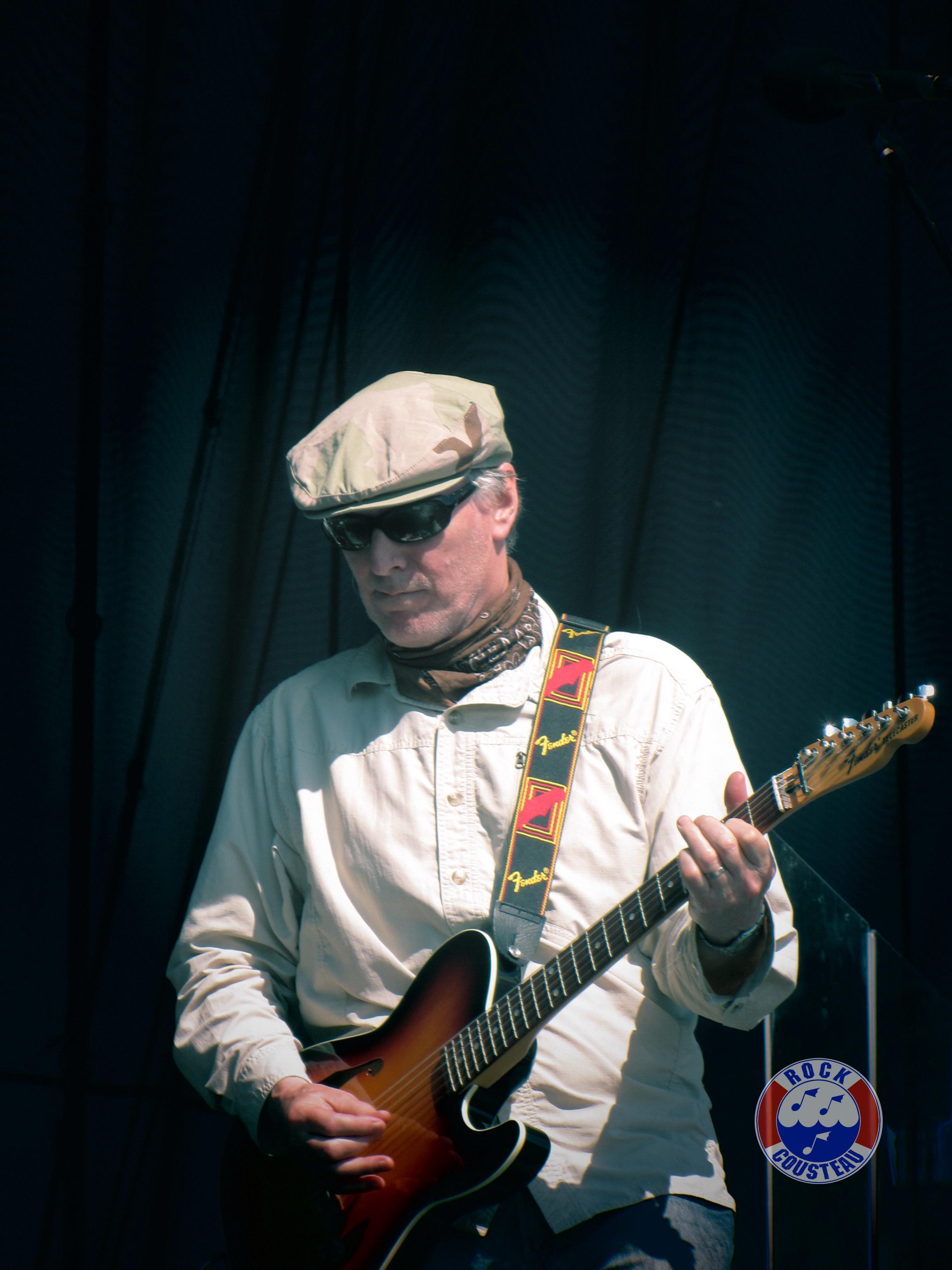
Steve Winwood is known for his influential R&B work with the Spencer Davis Group and Traffic.

The Rolling Stones became the second most popular UK band (after the Beatles) and led the "British Invasion" of the US pop charts. The Rolling Stones covered Bobby Womack & the Valentinos' song "It's All Over Now", giving them their first UK number one in 1964. Under the influence of blues and R&B, bands such as the Rolling Stones, the Yardbirds, and the Animals, and more jazz-influenced bands like the Graham Bond Organisation and Zoot Money, had blue-eyed soul albums. White R&B musicians popular in the UK included Steve Winwood, Frankie Miller, Scott Walker & the Walker Brothers, the Animals from Newcastle, the Spencer Davis Group, and Van Morrison & Them from Belfast. None of these bands exclusively played rhythm and blues, but it remained at the core of their early albums.

Champion Jack Dupree was a New Orleans blues and boogie woogie pianist who toured Europe and settled there from 1960, living in Switzerland and Denmark, then in Halifax, England, in the 1970s and 1980s, before finally settling in Germany. Average White Band and Ian Dury released funky singles. From the 1970s to 1980s, Carl Douglas, Hot Chocolate, Delegation, Junior, Central Line, Princess, Jaki Graham, Loose Ends, The Pasadenas, Ruby Turner, and Soul II Soul gained hits on the pop or R&B charts. UK R&B acts who gained success during the 1990s include Mark Morrison, Eternal, the Chimes, Carleen Anderson, D'Influence, Nu Colourz, Omar, and Bryan Powell. The music of the British mod subculture grew out of rhythm and blues and later soul performed by artists who were not available to the small London clubs where the scene originated. In the late 1960s, the Who performed American R&B songs such as the Motown hit "Heat Wave", a song which reflected the young mod lifestyle. Many of these bands enjoyed national success in the UK, but found it difficult to break into the American music market. The British white R&B bands produced music which was very different in tone from that of African-American artists.

== See also ==
- African-American music
- List of R&B musicians
- List of artists who reached number one on the Billboard R&B chart
- Lists of Billboard number-one rhythm and blues hits
- Music of the United States
