= Tresillo (rhythm) =

Rhythm pattern used in Latin American music

Tresillo (/trɛˈsiːjoʊ/ tres-EE-yoh; Spanish pronunciation: [tɾeˈsiʎo]) is a rhythmic pattern (shown below) used mainly in Latin American music and caribbean music.

Tresillo is the most fundamental duple-pulse rhythmic cell in Latin American music. It was introduced in the New World through the Atlantic slave trade during the Colonial period. The pattern is the most fundamental and most prevalent duple-pulse rhythmic cell in Sub-Saharan African music traditions.

The cinquillo pattern is another common embellishment of tresillo. Cinquillo is used frequently in the Cuban contradanza (the "habanera") and the danzón.

== Triplet (formal usage) ==
Tresillo is a Spanish word meaning "triplet"—three equal notes within the same time span normally occupied by two notes. In its formal usage, tresillo refers to a subdivision of the beat that does not normally occur within the given structure. Therefore, it is indicated by the number 3 between the halves of a horizontal bracket over the notes, as shown below. The first measure divides each beat in three: one, and, ah, two, and, ah. The second divides the span of two main beats by three (hemiola): one-ah, two-ah, three-ah.

== Duple-pulse correlative of 3:2 ==
=== Tresillo-over-two ===
Video of tresillo over two

Play tresillo:2

Play 3:2

Play the two alternating

In sub-Saharan rhythm, the four main beats are typically divided into three or four pulses, creating a 12-pulse (12/8), or 16-pulse (4/4) cycle. Every triple-pulse pattern has its duple-pulse correlate; the two pulse structures are two sides of the same coin. Cross-beats are generated by grouping pulses contrary to their given structure, for example: groups of two or four in 12/8 or groups of three or six in 4/4. The duple-pulse correlative of the three cross-beats of the hemiola, is known in Afro-Cuban music as tresillo. The pulse names of tresillo and the three cross-beats of the hemiola (3:2) are identical: one, one-ah, two-and.

=== Cross-beat generation ===
The composite pattern of tresillo and the main beats is commonly known as the habanera, congo, tango-congo, or tango. The habanera rhythm is the duple-pulse correlate of the vertical hemiola (above). The three cross-beats of the hemiola are generated by grouping triple pulses in twos: 6 pulses ÷ 2 = 3 cross-beats. Tresillo is generated by grouping duple pulses in threes: 8 pulses ÷ 3 = 2 cross-beats (consisting of three pulses each), with a remainder of a partial cross-beat (spanning two pulses). In other words, 8 ÷ 3 = 2, r2. Tresillo is a cross-rhythmic fragment. It contains the first three cross-beats of 4:3.

== Basic rhythmic cell (common usage in Cuban popular music) ==
=== Habanera (Cuban contradanza) ===
The Cuban contradanza, known outside of Cuba as the habanera, was the first written music to be rhythmically based on an African motif (tresillo and its variants). Tresillo is used as an ostinato figure in the left hand. The habanera was the first dance music from Cuba to be exported all over the world. Because of the habanera's global popularity, tresillo and its variants are found in popular music in nearly every city on the planet. Later, Cuban musical exports, such as the son, son montuno, and the mambo continued to reinforce the use of tresillo bass lines and vamps.

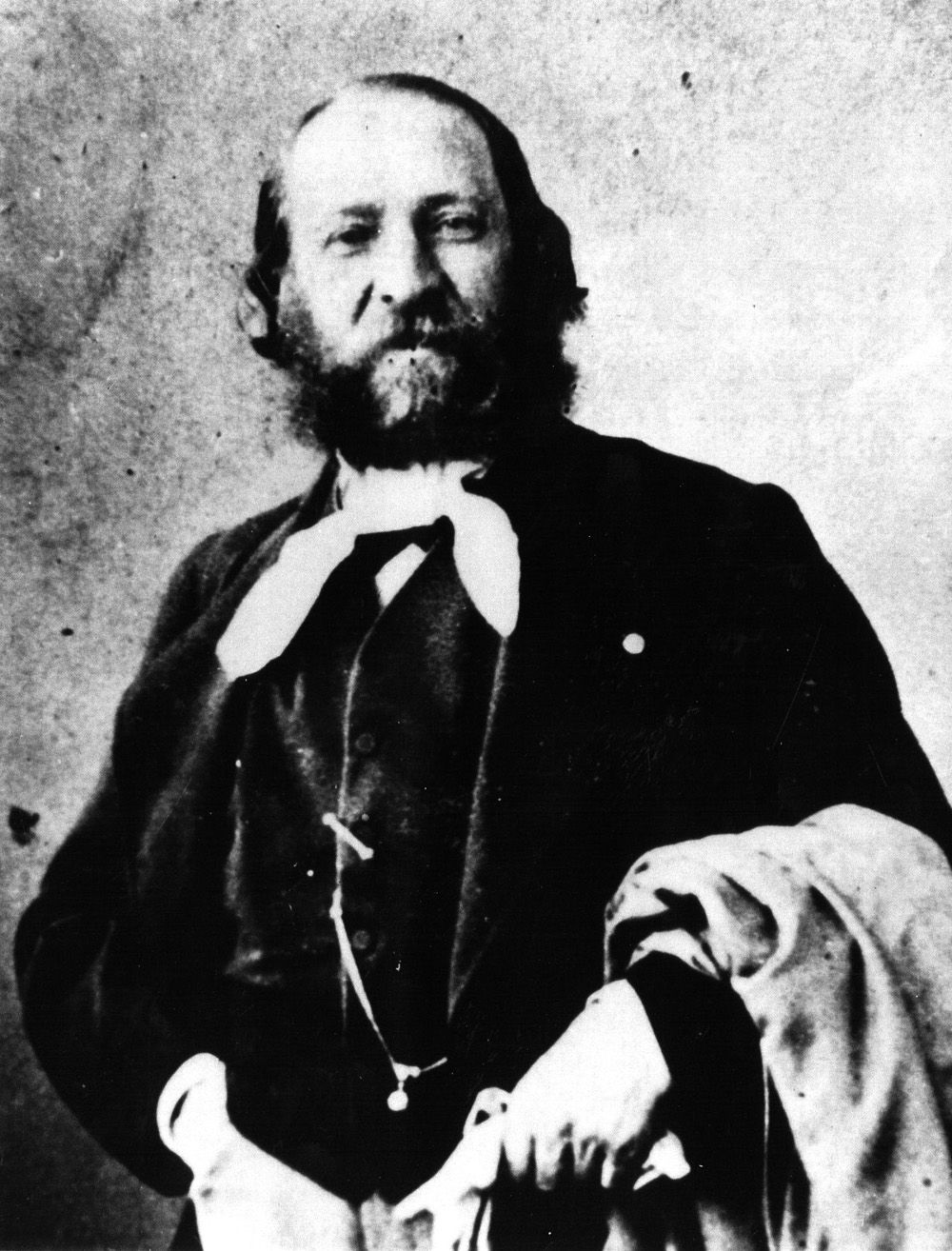
Composer Sebastián Iradier

"La Paloma" (1863) is one of the most popular habaneras, having been produced and reinterpreted in diverse cultures, settings, arrangements, and recordings over the last 140 years. The song was composed and written by Spanish composer Sebastián Iradier (later Yradier) after he visited Cuba in 1861. In the excerpt below, the left hand plays the tresillo rhythm.

=== The "three-side" of clave ===
As used in Cuban popular music, tresillo refers to the "three-side" (first three strokes) of the son clave pattern. (Note: [The] clave pattern has two opposing rhythm cells: the first cell consists of three strokes, or the rhythm cell, which is called tresillo (Spanish tres = three). This rhythmically syncopated part of the clave is called the three-side or the strong part of the clave. The second cell has two strokes and is called the two-side or the weak part of the clave... The different accent types in the melodic line typically encounter with the clave strokes, which have some special name. Some of the clave strokes are accented both in more traditional tambores batá music and in more modern salsa styles. Because of the popularity of these strokes, some special terms have been used to identify them. The second stroke of the strong part of the clave is called bombo. It is the most often accented clave stroke in my research material. Accenting it clearly identifies the three-side of the clave (Peñalosa The Clave Matrix 2009, 93-94). The second common clave stroke accented among these improvisations is the third stroke of the strong part of the clave. This stroke is called ponche. In Cuban popular genres, this stroke is often accented in unison breaks that transition between the song sections (Peñalosa 2009, 95; Mauleón 1993, 169). The third typical way to accent the clave strokes is to play a rhythm cell, which includes both bombo and ponche accents. This rhythm cell is called [the] conga pattern (Ortiz, Fernando 1965 [1950] La Africania De La Musica Folklorica De Cuba, 277; Mauleón 1993, 169-170). Iivari, Ville (2011: 1, 5). "The Relation Between clave Pattern and Violin Improvisation in Santería's Religious Feasts". Department of Musicology, University of Turku, Finland. Web.)

=== The most basic duple-pulse cell ===
Although the triplet divides the main beats by three pulses (triple-pulse) and tresillo divides them by four pulses (duple-pulse), the two figures share the same pulse names: one, one-ah, two-and. The common figure known as the habanera consists of tresillo with the second main beat.

The cinquillo pattern is another common embellishment of tresillo. Cinquillo is used frequently in the Cuban contradanza (the "habanera") and the danzón. The figure is also a common bell pattern found throughout sub-Saharan Africa.

=== Bass tumbao ===
Tresillo is the rhythmic basis of many African and Afro-Cuban drum rhythms, as well as the ostinato bass tumbao in Cuban son-based musics, such as son montuno, mambo, salsa, and Latin jazz. The example below shows a tresillo-based tumbao from "Alza los pies Congo" by Septeto Habanero (1925).

== In art music ==
Because of the popularity of the Cuban contradanza (habanera), the tresillo variant known as the habanera rhythm was adopted into European art music. For example, Georges Bizet's opera Carmen (1874) has a famous aria, "L'amour est un oiseau rebelle" based on a habanera pattern. The first seven measures are shown below.

In addition, Louis Moreau Gottschalk's first symphony, La nuit des tropiques (lit. "Night of the Tropics") (1860) was influenced by the composer's studies in Cuba. Gottschalk uses the tresillo variant cinquillo extensively. With Gottschalk, we see the beginning of serious treatment of Afro-Caribbean rhythmic elements in New World art music. Tresillo and the habanera rhythm are heard in the left hand of Gottschalk's salon piano compositions such as Souvenir de la Havane ("Souvenirs From Havana") (1859).

== Cinquillo-Tresillo in the French Antilles ==
Bélé (also called belair) was developed in rural Martinique and is played on a drum of the same name. The drum is played by two performers: one straddles the drum, playing on the drumhead with both hands and a foot (which is used to dampen and dry the drumhead in order to produce different pitches); the other performer uses a pair of sticks (called tibwa) to beat out characteristic and intricate cross-rhythms on the side of the drum.

In bélé, the cinquillo-tresillo is beat out by the tibwa, but it translates very well to the chacha (a maracas) when the rhythms are applied for playing biguine music. The biguine, a modern form of bélé, is accompanied by call-and-response singing and by dancing. The tibwa rhythm also provided inspiration for the chouval bwa and then for zouk (two Antillean popular music).

In zouk, the rhythm is often simplified to an almost-constant 3+3+2 motif and played with rimshots on the snare while the chacha or hi-hats play the cinquillo-tresillo rhythm.

== In African music ==
=== Gqom ===
Tresillo is present in South African music, particularly gqom music and its variants core tribe and taxi kick.

== In African-American music ==
=== Ragtime and jazz ===
African-American music began incorporating Afro-Cuban rhythmic motifs in the 1800s with the popularity of the Cuban contradanza (known outside of Cuba as the habanera). The habanera was the first written music to be rhythmically based on an African motif (1803). Musicians from Havana and New Orleans would take the twice-daily ferry between both cities to perform and not surprisingly, the habanera quickly took root in the musically fertile city of New Orleans. The habanera was the first of many Cuban music genres which enjoyed periods of popularity in the United States, and reinforced and inspired the use of tresillo-based rhythms in African American music. (Note: "[Afro]-Latin rhythms have been absorbed into black American styles far more consistently than into white popular music, despite Latin music's popularity among whites." (Roberts 1979: 41).)

From the perspective of African American music, the habanera rhythm can be thought of as a combination of tresillo and the backbeat.

Tresillo in African American music is one of the clearest examples of African rhythmic retention in the United States. (Note: Schuller, Gunther (1968: 19) "It is probably safe to say that by and large the simpler African rhythmic patterns survived in jazz ... because they could be adapted more readily to European rhythmic conceptions. Some survived, others were discarded as the Europeanization progressed. It may also account for the fact that patterns such as [tresillo have] ... remained one of the most useful and common syncopated patterns in jazz." Early Jazz; Its Roots and Musical Development. New York: Oxford Press.) There are examples of tresillo-like rhythms in a few African American folk musics such as the foot stomping patterns in ring shout and the post-Civil War drum and fife music. Tresillo is also heard prominently in New Orleans second line music. Wynton Marsalis considers tresillo to be the New Orleans "clave", although technically, the pattern is only half a clave.

John Storm Roberts states that "the habanera reached the United States 20 years before the first rag was published." Scott Joplin's "Solace" (1909) is considered a habanera. For the more than quarter-century in which the cakewalk, ragtime and proto-jazz were forming and developing, the habanera was a consistent part of African American popular music. Ned Sublette postulates that the habanera rhythm "found its way into ragtime and the cakewalk", while Roberts suggests that "the habanera influence may have been part of what freed black music from ragtime's European bass."

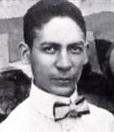
Jelly Roll Morton

Early New Orleans jazz bands had habaneras in their repertoire and the tresillo/habanera was a rhythmic staple of jazz at the turn of the 20th century. For example, "St. Louis Blues" (1914) by W.C. Handy has a tresillo bass line. Jelly Roll Morton considered the tresillo/habanera (which he called the Spanish tinge) to be an essential ingredient of jazz. Morton stated, "Now in one of my earliest tunes, "New Orleans Blues", you can notice the Spanish tinge. In fact, if you can't manage to put tinges of Spanish in your tunes, you will never be able to get the right seasoning, I call it, for jazz." An excerpt of "New Orleans Blues" is shown below. In the excerpt, the left hand plays the tresillo rhythm, while the right hand plays variations on cinquillo.

James P. Johnson's influential "Charleston" rhythm is based on the first two strokes of tresillo. Johnson said he learned the rhythm from dockworkers in the South Carolina city of the same name. Although the exact origins of jazz syncopation may never be known, there is evidence that the habanera/tresillo was there at its conception. Buddy Bolden, the first known jazz musician, is credited with creating the big four, a tresillo/habanera-based pattern. The big four was the first syncopated bass drum pattern to deviate from the standard on-the-beat march. As the example below shows, the second half of the big four pattern is the habanera rhythm.

In Early Jazz; Its Roots and Musical Development, Gunther Schuller states:

It is probably safe to say that by and large the simpler African rhythmic patterns survived in jazz ... because they could be adapted more readily to European rhythmic conceptions. Some survived, others were discarded as the Europeanization progressed. It may also account for the fact that patterns such as [tresillo have] ... remained one of the most useful and common syncopated patterns in jazz.

=== R&B ===
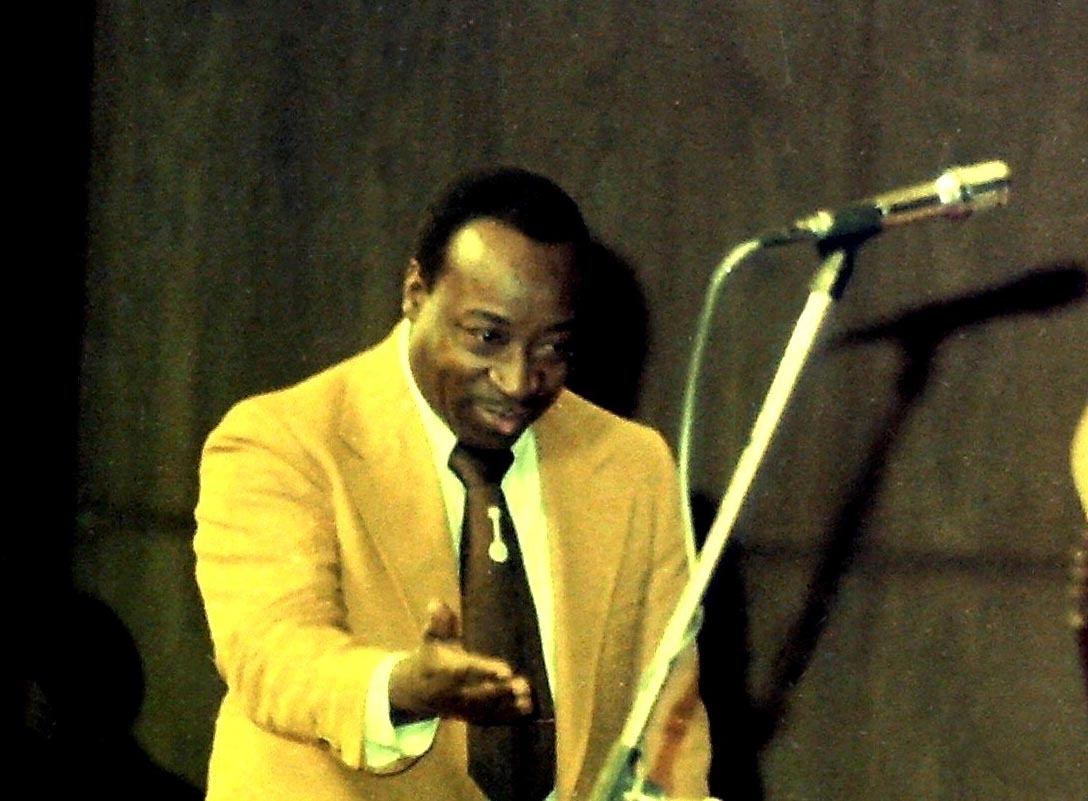
Dave Bartholomew in 1977

In the late 1940s, R&B music borrowed tresillo directly from Cuban music.

New Orleans producer-bandleader Dave Bartholomew first employed this figure (as a saxophone-section riff) on his own 1949 disc "Country Boy" and subsequently helped make it the most over-used rhythmic pattern in 1950s rock 'n' roll. On numerous recordings by Fats Domino, Little Richard and others, Bartholomew assigned this repeating three-note pattern not just to the string bass, but also to electric guitars and even baritone sax, making for a very heavy bottom. He recalls first hearing the figure – as a bass pattern on a Cuban disc.

— Palmer (1995)

In a 1988 interview with Robert Palmer, Bartholomew revealed how he initially superimposed tresillo over swing rhythm.

I heard the bass playing that part on a 'rumba' record. On "Country Boy" I had my bass and drums playing a straight swing rhythm and wrote out that rumba bass part for the saxes to play on top of the swing rhythm. Later, especially after rock 'n' roll came along, I made the 'rumba' bass part heavier and heavier. I'd have the string bass, an electric guitar and a baritone all in unison.

— Palmer (1988)

Bartholomew referred to son by the misnomer rumba, a common practice of that time. On Bartholomew's 1949 tresillo-based "Oh Cubanas", we clearly hear an attempt to blend African American and Afro-Cuban music.

Fats Domino's "Blue Monday", produced by Bartholomew, is another example of this now classic use of tresillo in R&B. On Bartholomew's 1949 tresillo-based "Oh Cubanas" we clearly hear an attempt to blend African American and Afro-Cuban music. In his composition "Misery" (1957), New Orleans pianist Professor Longhair (Henry Roeland Byrd) plays a habanera-like figure in his left hand.

The bass line on Elvis Presley's 1956 "Hound Dog" is perhaps the most well known rock 'n roll example of the tresillo rhythm pattern.

=== Post-bop ===
The first jazz standard composed by a non-Latin to play off of the correlation between tresillo and the hemiola, was Wayne Shorter's "Footprints" (1967). On the version recorded on Miles Smiles by Miles Davis, the bass switches to tresillo at 2:20. This type of African-based rhythmic interplay between the two pulse (subdivision) structures, was explored in the 1940s by Machito's Afro-Cubans. Those structures are accessed directly by Ron Carter (bass) and Tony Williams (drums), via the rhythmic sensibilities of swing. Throughout the piece, the four beats, whether sounded or not, are maintained as the temporal referent.

In the example below, the main beats are indicated by slashed noteheads. They are shown here for reference and do not indicate bass notes.

Mongo Santamaria used the tresillo bass pattern in his 1958 jazz standard “Afro Blue”.

== In Middle Eastern and Asian music ==
Tresillo written in divisive form (top) and additive form (bottom)

Tresillo is found within a wide geographic belt stretching from Morocco to Indonesia. Tresillo is used in many different types of music across the entire continent of Africa. Use of the pattern in Moroccan music can be traced back to slaves brought north across the Sahara Desert from present-day Mali. This pattern may have migrated east from North Africa to Asia through the spread of Islam. In Egyptian music and music from the Levant, the Tresillo pattern is referred to as "Malfouf". African-based music has a divisive rhythm structure. Tresillo is generated through cross-rhythm. In Middle Eastern and Asian music, the figure is generated through additive rhythm, 3+3+2:

Although the difference between the two ways of notating this rhythm may seem small, they stem from fundamentally different conceptions. Those who wish to convey a sense of the rhythm's background [main beats], and who understand the surface morphology in relation to a regular subsurface articulation, will prefer the divisive format. Those who imagine the addition of three, then three, then two sixteenth notes will treat the well-formedness of 3 + 3 + 2 as fortuitous, a product of grouping rather than of metrical structure. They will be tempted to deny that African music has a bona fide metrical structure because of its frequent departures from normative grouping structure.

— Agawu (2003: 87)

In divisive form, the strokes of tresillo contradict the beats. In additive form, the strokes of tresillo are the beats. From a metrical perspective then, the two ways of perceiving tresillo constitute two different rhythms. On the other hand, from the perspective of simply the pattern of attack-points, tresillo is a shared element of traditional folk music from the northwest tip of Africa to southeast tip of Asia. Today, through the global spread of hip-hop music, we hear the tresillo bass drum superimposed over traditional genres in dance clubs across the vast Africa–Asia "tresillo-belt".

== Notes and references ==
Notes
