= Cinquillo =

Caribbean rhythmic cell

A cinquillo is a typical Caribbean rhythmic cell, used in the Cuban contradanza and the danzón, Dominican Pambiche and the siká and cuembé Puerto Rican Bomba. The figure is a common bell pattern found throughout sub-Saharan Africa. It consists of an eighth, a sixteenth, an eighth, a sixteenth, and an eighth note. Placing this rhythm in a 2/4 measure produces a strongly syncopated character from the sustained note which replaces an articulated one on the first quarter of the second beat. Cinquillo is an embellishment of the more basic pattern known as tresillo. Cinquillo is shown twice below. The first one merely displays the note values. The second one is a so-called orthographic notation, which gives an impression of the syncopated character.

When followed by four unsyncopated eighth notes, it is known as the baqueteo. Like the clave, this forms a pair of measures, syncopated and unsyncopated. The baqueteo is in fact, is an embellishment of clave, as it contains all of that key pattern's strokes. The baqueteo is shown below with both cells contained within a single measure.

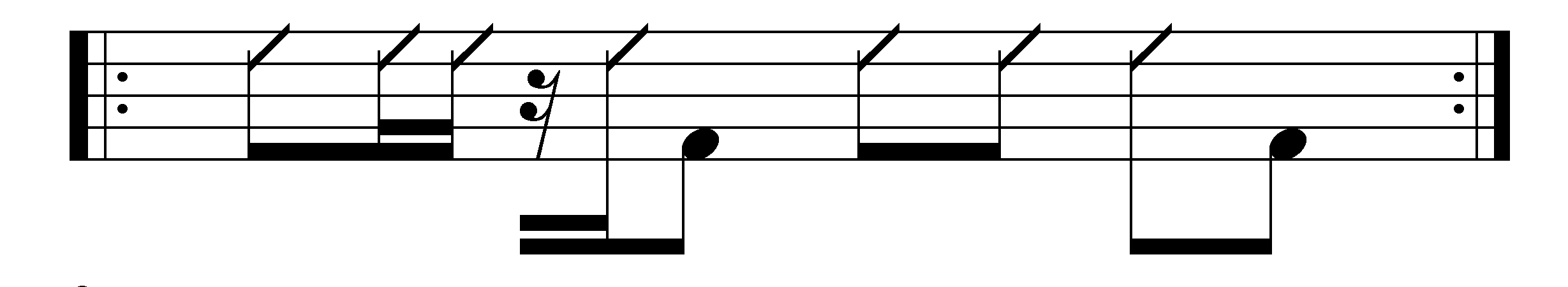
Basic baqueteo timbales part

The biguine uses a cinquillo variant related to that found in other Caribbean genres.
