= Contradanza =

Hispanic music and dance genre

- Other names: Contradanza criolla; Habanera
- Stylistic origins: Contredanse; African music; Spanish music
- Cultural origins: Late 18th century, Cuba
- Typical instruments: Piano; Violin; Flute; Clarinet; Double bass; Timpani; Güiro; Guitar
- Derivative forms: Danzón; Tango; Maxixe; Milonga

Other topics
- Cuban music

Contradanza (also called contradanza criolla, danza, danza criolla, or habanera) is the Spanish and Spanish-American version of the contradanse, which was an internationally popular style of music and dance in the 18th century, derived from the English country dance and adopted at the court of France. Contradanza was brought to America and there took on folkloric forms that still exist in Bolivia, Mexico, Venezuela, Colombia, Peru, Panama and Ecuador.

In Cuba during the 19th century, it became an important genre, the first written music to be rhythmically based on an African rhythm pattern and the first Cuban dance to gain international popularity, the progenitor of danzón, mambo and cha-cha-cha, with a characteristic "habanera rhythm" and sung lyrics.

Outside Cuba, the Cuban contradanza became known as the habanera – the dance of Havana – and that name was adopted in Cuba itself subsequent to its international popularity in the later 19th century, though it was never so called by the people who created it.

== History ==
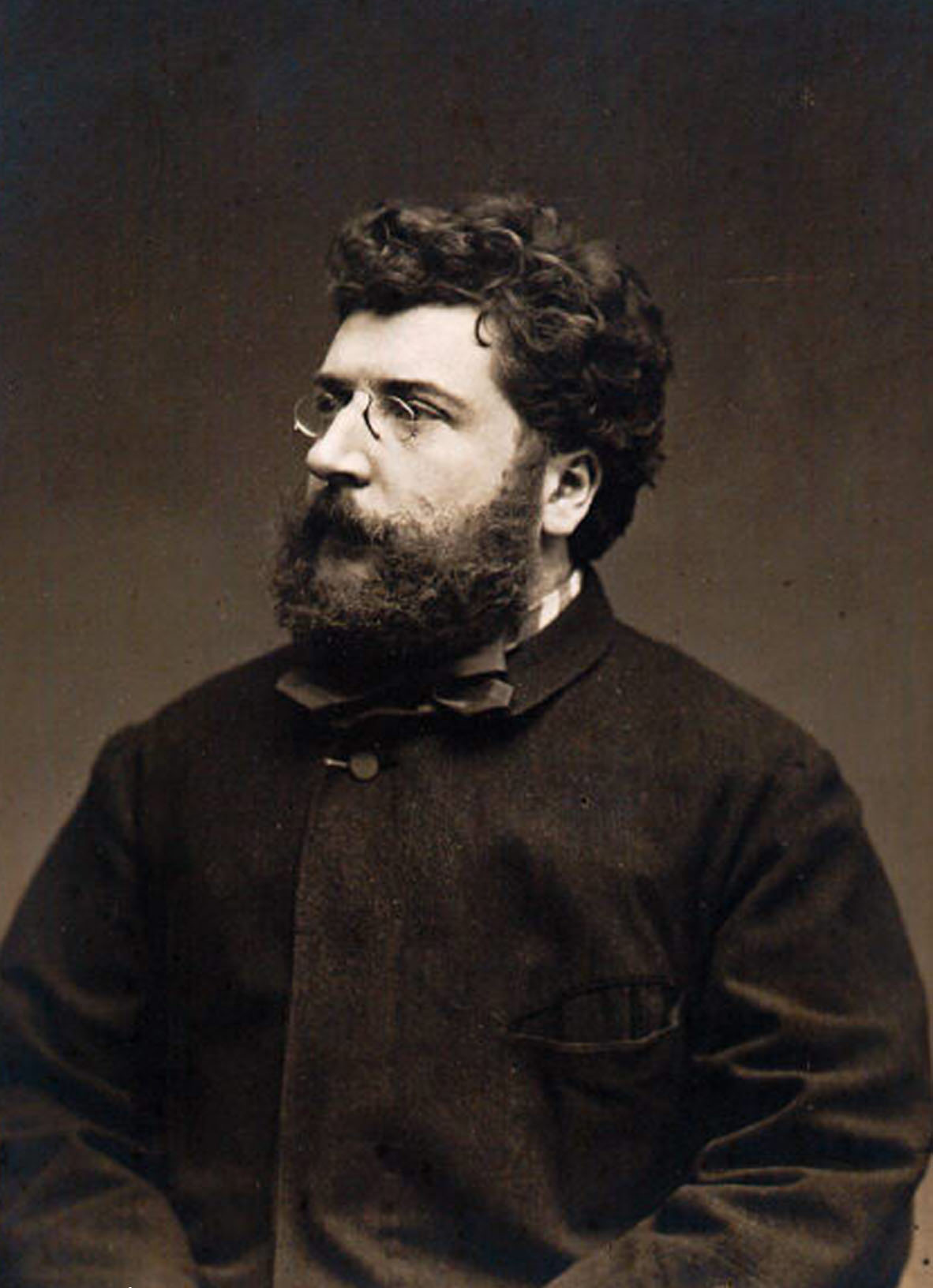
Bizet included a habanera in his opera Carmen, derived from Yradier's "El Arreglito".

The contradanza was popular in Spain and spread throughout Spanish America during the 18th century. According to musicologist Peter Manuel, it may be impossible to resolve the question of the contradanza's origin, as it has been pointed out by Cuban musicologist Natalio Galán in humorously labeling the genre as "anglofrancohispanoafrocubano" (English-French-Spanish-African-Cuban).

The most conventional consensus in regard to the origin of this popular Cuban genre was established by novelist Alejo Carpentier, in his book from 1946, La Música en Cuba. In the book, he proposes a theory that signals the French contredance, supposedly introduced in Cuba by French immigrants fleeing the Haitian Revolution (1791–1803), as the prototype for the creation of the creolized Cuban contradanza. However, according to other important Cuban musicologists, such as Zoila Lapique and Natalio Galán, it is quite likely that the contradanza had been introduced to Havana directly from Spain, France or England several decades earlier.

The earliest Cuban contradanza of which a record remains is "San Pascual Bailón", which was written in 1803. Certain characteristics would set the Cuban contradanza apart from the contredanse by the mid-19th century, notably the incorporation of the African cross-rhythm called the tresillo.

The habanera is also slower and as a dance more graceful in style than the older contradanza but retains the binary form of classical dance, being composed in two parts of 8 to 16 bars each, though often with an introduction. An early identifiable contradanza habanera, "La Pimienta", an anonymous song published in an 1836 collection, is the earliest known piece to use the characteristic habanera rhythm in the left hand of the piano.

The contradanza, when played as dance music, was performed by an orquesta típica composed of two violins, two clarinets, a contrabass, a cornet, a trombone, an ophicleide, paila and a güiro. But the habanera was sung as well as danced.

During the first half of the 19th century, the contradanza dominated the Cuban musical scene to such an extent that nearly all Cuban composers of the time, whether composing for the concert hall or the dance hall, tried their hands at the contradanza. Among them Manuel Saumell (1817–1870) is the most noted.

The New Orleans born pianist/composer Louis Moreau Gottschalk (1829–1869) wrote several pieces with the rhythm, gleaned in part from his travels through Cuba and the West Indies: "Danza" (1857), "La Gallina, Danse Cubaine" (1859), "Ojos Criollos" (1859) and "Souvenir de Porto Rico" (1857) among others.

It is thought that the Cuban style was brought by sailors to Spain, where it became popular for a while before the turn of the twentieth century. The Basque composer Sebastian Yradier's "La Paloma" ("The Dove"), achieved great fame in Spain and America. The dance was adopted by all classes of society and had its moment in English and French salons.

It was so well established as a Spanish dance that Jules Massenet included one in the ballet music to his opera Le Cid (1885). Maurice Ravel wrote a Vocalise-Étude en forme de Habanera, and a habanera for Rapsodie espagnole (movement III, originally a piano piece written in 1895), Camille Saint-Saëns' Havanaise for violin and orchestra is still played and recorded today, as is Emmanuel Chabrier's Habanera for orchestra (originally for piano). Bernard Herrmann's score for Vertigo (1958) makes prominent use of the rhythm as a clue to the film's mystery.

Habanera rhythmClaveCarmen bass line

In Andalusia (especially Cádiz), Valencia and Catalonia, the habanera is still popular. "La Paloma", "La bella Lola" or "El meu avi" ("My Grandfather") are well known. From Spain, the style arrived in the Philippines where it still exists as a minor art-form.

In the 20th century, the habanera gradually became a relic form in Cuba, especially after the success of the son. However, some of its compositions were transcribed and reappeared in other formats later on: Eduardo Sánchez de Fuentes' Tú is still a much-loved composition. The music and dance of the contradanza/danza are no longer popular in Cuba but are occasionally featured in the performances of folklore groups.

== Rhythm ==
Top: habanera rhythm (tresillo-over-twoBottom: Vertical hemiola (three-over-twoThe two alternating

The habanera rhythm's time signature is 2/4. An accented upbeat in the middle of the bar lends power to the habanera rhythm, especially when it is as a bass ostinato in contradanzas such as "Tu madre es conga". Syncopated cross-rhythms called the tresillo and the cinquillo, basic rhythmic cells in Afro-Latin and African music, began the Cuban dance's differentiation from its European form. Their unequally-grouped accents fall irregularly in a one or two bar pattern: the rhythm superimposes duple and triple accents in cross-rhythm (3:2) or vertical hemiola.

This pattern is heard throughout Africa, and in many diaspora musics, known as the Congo, tango-Congo, and tango. Thompson identifies the rhythm as the Kongo mbilu a makinu ("call to the dance"). The syncopated rhythm may be vocalised as "boom...ba-bop-bop", and "da, ka ka kan". It may be sounded with the Ghanaian beaded gourd instrument axatse, vocalized as: "pa ti pa pa", beginning on the second beat so that the last "pa" coincides with beat one, ending on the beginning of the cycle so that the part contributes to the cyclic nature of the rhythm, the "pa's" sounding the tresillo by striking the gourd against the knee, and the "ti" sounding the main beat two by raising the gourd and striking it with the free hand.

The cinquillo pattern is sounded on a bell in the folkloric Congolese-based makuta as played in Havana.

A variant of the habanera rhythm.

Carpentier states that the cinquillo was brought to Cuba in the songs of the black slaves and freedmen who emigrated to Santiago de Cuba from Haiti in the 1790s and that composers in western Cuba remained ignorant of its existence:

In the days when a trip from Havana to Santiago was a fifteen-day adventure (or more), it was possible for two types of contradanza to coexist: one closer to the classical pattern, marked by the spirits of the minuet, which later would be reflected in the danzón, by way of the danza; the other, more popular, which followed its evolution begun in Haiti, thanks to the presence of the 'French Blacks' in eastern Cuba.

—

Manuel disputes Carpentier's claim, mentioning "at least a half a dozen Havana counterparts whose existence refutes Carpentier's claim for the absence of the cinquillo in Havana contradanza".

== Danza, tango and later developments ==
The 6/8 contradanza evolved into the clave (not to be confused with the key pattern of the same name), the criolla and the guajira. From the contradanza in 2/4 came the (danza) habanera and the danzón. According to Argeliers Léon, the word danza was merely a contraction of contradanza and there are no substantial differences between the music of the contradanza and the danza, Both terms continued to denominate what was essentially the same thing throughout the 19th century. But although the contradanza and danza were musically identical, the dances were different.

A danza entitled "El Sungambelo", dated 1813, has the same structure as the contradanza – the four-section scheme is repeated twice, ABAB and the cinquillo rhythm can already be heard.

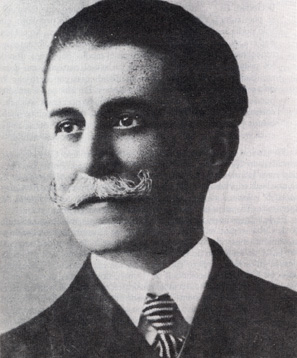
Ignacio Cervantes

The danza dominated Cuban music in the second half of the 19th century, though not as completely as the contradanza had in the first half. Two famous Cuban composers in particular, Ignacio Cervantes (1847–1905) and Ernesto Lecuona (1895–1963), used the danza as the basis of some of their most memorable compositions.

In Cuba the danza was supplanted by the danzón from the 1870s onwards, though the danza continued to be composed as dance music into the 1920s. By this time, the charanga had replaced the orquesta típica of the 19th century. The danzón has a different but related rhythm, the baqueteo, and the dance is quite different.

The Argentine milonga and tango makes use of the habanera rhythm of a dotted quarter-note followed by three eighth-notes, with an accent on the first and third notes. As the consistent rhythmic foundation of the bass line in Argentine tango the habanera lasted for a relatively short time until a variation, noted by Roberts, began to predominate.

In 1883 Ventura Lynch, a scholar of the dances and folklore of Buenos Aires, noted the milonga dance was "so universal in the environs of the city that it is an obligatory piece at all the lower-class dances (bailecitos de medio pelo), and ... has also been taken up by the organ-grinders, who have arranged it so as to sound like the habanera dance. It is danced in the low life clubs ..."

The contradanza remains an essential part of the tango's music. For example, Aníbal Troilo's 1951 milonga song "La trampera" (Cheating Woman) uses the same habanera heard in Georges Bizet's opera 1875 Carmen.

== African-American music ==
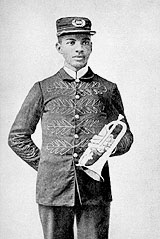
WC Handy (1873–1958) aged 19

African-American music began incorporating Contradanza musical motifs in the 1800s. The Contradanza rhythm is heard prominently in New Orleans second line music, and there are examples of similar rhythms in some African-American folk music such as the foot-stamping patterns in ring shout and in post-Civil War drum and fife music. John Storm Roberts states that the musical genre "reached the U.S. 20 years before the first rag was published".

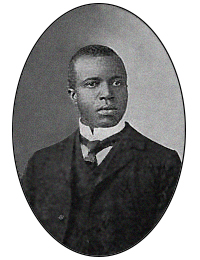
Scott Joplin (c. 1867–1917)

For the more than quarter-century in which the cakewalk, ragtime, and proto-jazz were forming and developing, the habanera was a consistent part of African-American popular music. Early New Orleans jazz bands had habaneras in their repertoire and the tresillo/habanera figure was a rhythmic staple of jazz at the turn of the 20th century. A habanera was written and published in Butte, Montana in 1908. The song was titled "Solita" and was written by Jack Hangauer. Scott Joplin's "Solace" (1909) is considered a habanera (though it is labeled a "Mexican serenade"). "St. Louis Blues" (1914) by W. C. Handy has a habanera/tresillo bass line. Handy noted a reaction to the habanera rhythm included in Will H. Tyler's "Maori": "I observed that there was a sudden, proud and graceful reaction to the rhythm ... White dancers, as I had observed them, took the number in stride. I began to suspect that there was something Negroid in that beat." After noting a similar reaction to the same rhythm in "La Paloma", Handy included this rhythm in his "St. Louis Blues", the instrumental copy of "Memphis Blues", the chorus of "Beale Street Blues", and other compositions.

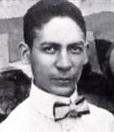
Jelly Roll Morton (1890–1941)

Jelly Roll Morton considered the tresillo/habanera (which he called the Spanish tinge) an essential ingredient of jazz. The rhythm can be heard in the left hand on songs such as "The Crave" (1910, recorded in 1938).

Now in one of my earliest tunes, "New Orleans Blues", you can notice the Spanish tinge. In fact, if you can't manage to put tinges of Spanish in your tunes, you will never be able to get the right seasoning, I call it, for jazz.

— Morton (1938: Library of Congress Recording)

Although the exact origins of jazz syncopation may never be known, there's evidence that the habanera/tresillo was there at its conception. Buddy Bolden, the first known jazz musician, is credited with creating the big four, a habanera-based pattern. The big four (below) was the first syncopated bass drum pattern to deviate from the standard on-the-beat march. As the example below shows, the second half of the big four pattern is the habanera rhythm.

== In Asian music ==
Elements of the Habanera are also incorporated into popular Japanese music called Ryūkōka. It is mixed with traditional Min'yō. It was mainly through the influence of Milonga and Tango that this rhythm reached Japan.

Some examples are :

- Nihonbashi kara( にほんばし から) by Seki Taneko (せき たねこ) (1932)
- Matendo by Sato Chiyako (1929)
- Kamome Kanashiya by Yayoi tanaka

== Selected recordings ==
- Yo Siempre Te Esperé (Imperio Argentina, 1932)
- Cuando silba el viento (Mercedes Simone, 1936)

== See also ==
- Danzón
- French contredanse
- Guaracha
- La tumba francesa
- Music of Haiti
- Contra dance
