= Jelly Roll Morton: The Complete Library of Congress Recordings =

Box set by Jelly Roll Morton
- Released: September 27, 2005
- Recorded: May–December 1938; April 1949
- Genre: Jazz
- Length: 539:03 (8 hours, 59 minutes and 3 seconds)
- Label: Rounder Records
- Producers: Jeffrey Greenberg and Anna Lomax Wood

Jelly Roll Morton: The Complete Library of Congress Recordings is a 2005 box set of recordings from jazz pioneer Jelly Roll Morton. The set spans 128 tracks over eight CDs. It won two Grammy Awards in 2006 for Best Historical Album and Best Album Notes.

== Background ==
In 1938, noted musicologist and Morton biographer Alan Lomax conducted a series of interviews with Morton at the Library of Congress. Richard Cook and Brian Morton describe these recordings as Jelly Roll Morton's "virtual history of the birth pangs of jazz as it happened in the New Orleans of the turn of the century. His memory was unimpaired, although he chose to tell things as he preferred to remember them, perhaps; and his hands were still in complete command of the keyboard."

Excerpts from the sessions first appeared on a 1948 album. Riverside Records issued the recordings as LP records in 1955. Ron Wynn and Bruce Boyd Raeburn note that "though the albums came out posthumously, the interviews generated tremendous new interest in Morton's life and music." During the 1990s, Rounder Records released a series of compact discs including the musical content, but not the dialogue, from the 1938 sessions. Both the Riverside and earlier Rounder releases were heavily expurgated, and as recently as 2008, when selections from the complete Rounder collection were featured in a BBC Radio 4 documentary on Morton, presenter Marybeth Hamilton noted that, even then, some of the recordings were still considered unsuitable for broadcast, due to the obscene nature of some of the lyrics and Morton's narration.

== 2005 release ==
In 2005, Rounder released the 1938 recordings in their entirety as part of an eight-disc box set. The first seven discs include Lomax's 1938 interviews, in which Morton describes his life and the early days of jazz, plays piano, and sings. The eighth disc includes 1949 recordings of Morton's contemporaries, reminiscing about Morton and providing musical demonstrations.

The set was originally released in a piano-shaped box and included a copy of Mister Jelly Roll, Lomax's biography about Morton. The set also includes a PDF file including additional liner notes, complete transcriptions of the recorded dialogue and lyrics, additional unrecorded interviews and archival documents and photos.

In 2007, Rounder released Jelly Roll Morton: The Library of Congress Recordings by Alan Lomax, a single disc consisting of selected highlights from the box set.

== Reception ==
Professional ratings
Review scores
Source	Rating
Allmusic	4.5/5 stars
Austin Chronicle	5/5 stars
Penguin Guide to Jazz	4/4 stars
Rolling Stone	4/5 stars

arwulf arwulf [sic], writing for AllMusic, described the recordings as having been "beautifully restored."

Harvey Pekar, writing for The Austin Chronicle, gave the set a five-star rating (of a possible five), noting that "[Morton's] oral history here is provocative, and his playing bears out some of the hard-to-believe statements that have been made by (and about) him."

Richard Cook and Brian Morton, writing for The Penguin Guide to Jazz, gave the set a four-star rating (of a possible four), describing it as "surely the most comprehensive coverage of the speech and music to date.… It is a wonderfully illustrated lecture on Morton's music by the man who created it. Indispensable records for anyone interested in jazz history."

Louis Armstrong recorded an audio response to the 1948 album version of the recordings in 1950 or 1951, praising Morton but taking issue with Morton's recollections about scat singing.

== Track listing ==
Disc 1
No.	Title	Length
1.	"I'm Alabama Bound"	4:03
2.	"Time in Mobile"	4:13
3.	"King Porter Stomp"	4:06
4.	"The Story of 'King Porter Stomp'"	3:53
5.	"Jelly Roll's Background"	4:22
6.	"Music Lessons"	4:05
7.	"Miserere"	4:05
8.	"The Stomping Grounds"	4:15
9.	"The Style of Sammy Davis"	4:17
10.	"Tony Jackson Was the Favorite / Dope, Crown, and Opium"	4:00
11.	"Poor Alfred Wilson"	4:02
12.	"Honky Tonk Blues / In New Orleans, Anyone Could Carry a Gun"	4:20
13.	"New Orleans was a Free and Easy Place"	4:06
14.	"The Story of Aaron Harris"	4:06
Total length:		57:53

Disc 2
No.	Title	Length
1.	"The Story of Aaron Harris, continued / Aaron Harris Blues"	4:05
2.	"Aaron Harris, His Hoodoo Woman, and the Hat That Started a Riot"	4:10
3.	"The Story of the 1900 New Orleans Riot and the Song of Robert Charles"	4:04
4.	"The Story of the 1900 New Orleans Riot, continued"	4:04
5.	"Game Kid Blues"	3:57
6.	"New Orleans Funerals"	4:17
7.	"Funeral Marches"	4:11
8.	"Oh! Didn't He Ramble"	4:07
9.	"Tiger Rag, third, fourth, and fifth strains"	4:02
10.	"Tiger Rag / Panama"	4:02
11.	"The Right Tempo is the Accurate Tempo"	4:39
12.	"Jazz Discords and Story of the Kansas City Stomp"	4:31
13.	"Kansas City Stomp, continued"	4:34
14.	"Slow Swing and 'Sweet Jazz Music'"	4:32
15.	"Salty Dog / Bill Johnson, Jelly's Brother-in-Law"	4:22
16.	"Hesitation Blues"	4:30
Total length:		68:07

Disc 3
No.	Title	Length
1.	"My Gal Sal""	3:51
2.	"The St. Louis Scene"	4:09
3.	"Maple Leaf Rag, St. Louis style / Maple Leaf Rag, New Orleans style"	4:19
4.	"Jelly Roll Carves St. Louis"	4:19
5.	"Jelly Roll Carves St. Louis, continued"	4:23
6.	"New Orleans Blues"	3:58
7.	"Winin' Boy Blues"	3:45
8.	"Winin' Boy Blues, continued"	4:24
9.	"The Anamule Dance"	3:46
10.	"The Anamule Dance, continued"	4:19
11.	"The Great Buddy Bolden / Buddy Bolden's Blues"	4:11
12.	"The Great Buddy Bolden, continued"	4:11
13.	"Mr. Jelly Lord"	4:09
14.	"How Jelly Roll Got His Name"	4:14
15.	"Original Jelly Roll Blues"	4:09
16.	"Honky Tonk Blues"	4:07
Total length:		66:14

Disc 4
No.	Title	Length
1.	"Real Tough Boys"	4:31
2.	"Sporting Attire and Shooting the Agate"	4:33
3.	"Sweet Mamas and Sweet Papas"	4:20
4.	"See See Rider"	4:24
5.	"Parading with the Broadway Swells"	4:22
6.	"Fights and Weapons"	4:27
7.	"Luis Russell and New Orleans Riffs"	4:25
8.	"Jelly's Travels: From Yazoo to Clarksdale"	4:14
9.	"Jelly's Travels: From Clarksdale to Helena"	4:34
10.	"Jelly's Travels: From Helena to Memphis"	4:23
11.	"In Memphis: The Monarch Saloon and Benny Frenchy"	4:24
12.	"Benny Frenchy's Tune, continued"	4:23
13.	"Make Me a Pallet on the Floor"	4:15
14.	"Make Me a Pallet on the Floor, continued"	4:14
15.	"Make Me a Pallet on the Floor, part 3"	4:14
16.	"Make Me a Pallet on the Floor, concluded"	4:35
Total length:		70:18

Disc 5
No.	Title	Length
1.	"The Dirty Dozen"	4:30
2.	"The Murder Ballad, part 1"	4:05
3.	"The Murder Ballad, part 2"	4:17
4.	"The Murder Ballad, part 3"	4:29
5.	"The Murder Ballad, part 4"	4:19
6.	"The Murder Ballad, part 5"	4:15
7.	"The Murder Ballad, part 6"	4:29
8.	"The Murder Ballad, part 7"	4:32
9.	"Fickle Fay Creep"	3:17
10.	"Jungle Blues"	3:43
11.	"King Porter Stomp"	2:55
12.	"Sweet Peter"	3:04
13.	"Hyena Stomp"	3:32
14.	"Wolverine Blues, begun"	3:45
15.	"Wolverine Blues, concluded"	4:04
16.	"State And Madison"	3:48
17.	"The Pearls, begun"	3:28
18.	"The Pearls, concluded"	3:35
Total length:		70:07

Disc 6
No.	Title	Length
1.	"Bert Williams"	3:41
2.	"Freakish"	3:59
3.	"Pep"	3:32
4.	"The Georgia Skin Game"	3:54
5.	"The Georgia Skin Game, continued"	3:03
6.	"The Georgia Skin Game, conclusion"	3:19
7.	"Ungai Hai"	4:09
8.	"New Orleans Blues"	4:07
9.	"The Spanish Tinge"	4:13
10.	"Improving Spanish Tempos"	4:06
11.	"Creepy Feeling, concluded"	4:28
12.	"The Crave"	4:37
13.	"Mamanita"	4:12
14.	"C'était N'aut' Can-Can, Payez Donc"	4:21
15.	"Spanish Swat"	4:21
16.	"Ain't Misbehavin'"	4:11
17.	"I Hate a Man Like You / Rolling Stuff"	4:11
18.	"Michigan Water Blues"	3:51
Total length:		72:15

Disc 7
No.	Title	Length
1.	"Winin' Boy Blues"	3:45
2.	"Winin' Boy Blues, continued"	4:24
3.	"Boogie Woogie Blues"	4:21
4.	"Buddy Bertrand's Blues, continued / Mamie's Blues"	4:25
5.	"When the Hot Stuff Came In"	8:40
6.	"The First Hot Arrangements"	9:00
7.	"The Pensacola Kid and the Cadillac Café"	7:57
8.	"At the Cadillac Café, Los Angeles"	9:54
9.	"Little Liza Jane, continued / On the West Coast"	9:45
10.	"In the Publishing Business"	8:50
Total length:		71:01

Disc 8
No.	Title	Length
1.	"Original Jelly Roll Blues"	1:51
2.	"Jelly Roll's Early Playing Days in the District"	1:22
3.	"Hot Bands and Creole Tunes"	4:29
4.	"Eh, La Bas"	2:02
5.	"Old-Time Creole Musicians and the French Element"	3:32
6.	"Playing Hot with Buddy Bolden"	3:17
7.	"High Society"	2:15
8.	"Sporting Life Costumes"	1:38
9.	"Buddy Bolden: Man and Musician"	2:23
10.	"Creoles Playing with Negroes: Getting that Drive"	4:28
11.	"Jelly Roll's Compositions"	3:22
12.	"How Johnny St. Cyr Learned to Play Guitar"	2:20
13.	"Guitar Blues"	2:17
14.	"Bad Men and Pimps"	3:38
15.	"The Story of the Coon Blues"	1:33
16.	"Coon Blues"	2:22
17.	"Jazz is Just a Makeup: Buddy Bolden, Honky Tonks, Brass Band Funerals, and Parades"	5:25
18.	"Young Sidney Bechet: Jim Crow and the Dangers of the District"	3:40
19.	"The Main Idea in Jazz"	3:23
20.	"Of All His Mother's Children He Loved Jelly the Best"	6:17
Total length:		61:34

== Credits ==
- Jelly Roll Morton – piano, vocals, guitar, commentary
- Alan Lomax – interviewer
- Johnny St. Cyr – guitar, commentary
- Leonard Bechet – commentary
- Paul Dominguez Jr. – guitar, commentary
- Albert Glenny – commentary
- Alphonse Picou – commentary
- John Szwed - album notes
