= Lanciego/Lantziego =

Lanciego / Lantziego
- Municipality
- Lantziego
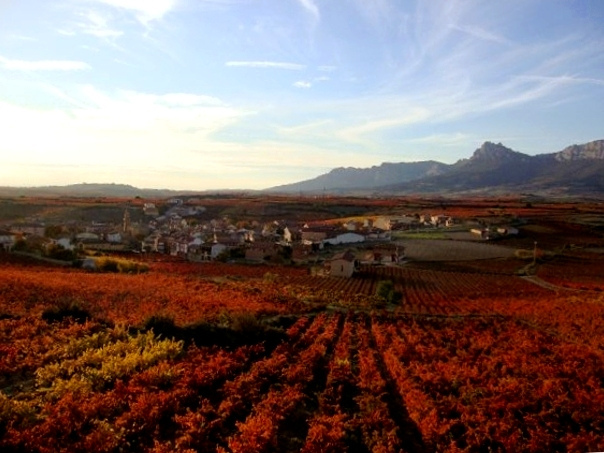

- Coat of arms

- Location in Spain Lanciego / Lantziego (Spain)
- Coordinates: 42°34′N 02°31′W
- Country: Spain
- Autonomous community: País Vasco
- Province: Álava
- Eskualdea / Comarca: Rioja Alavesa
- Founded: 1630

Government
  - Mayor: Alfonso Luis González Eguilaz (EAJ-PNV)

Area
  - Total: 24.20 km^{2} (9.34 sq mi)
- Elevation: 541 m (1,775 ft)
- Time zone: UTC+1 (CET)
  - Summer (DST): UTC+2 (CEST)
- Postal code: 01308
- Official languages: Basque, Spanish
- Website: www.lanciego.org

Lanciego in Spanish or Lantziego in Basque is a town and municipality located in the province of Álava, in the Basque Country, northern Spain. The municipality of Lanciego in Rioja Alavesa consists of three towns: Lanciego, Assa and Viñaspre. Lanciego has a total population of approximately 650. Its name derives from Lantzeaga (place of culture) and Lantze = cultivate.

== Places of interest ==
=== Religious Monuments ===
- The church of San Acisclo y Santa Victoria.
- The Hermitage of La Virgen del Campo.

=== Recreational Facilities ===
- The public open air swimming pools.
- The municipal leisure centre.
- The old Frontón.

== History ==
Lanciego (in Basque Lantziego), located in Rioja Alavesa, settles on a relatively flat area, in a small vale at the feet of the Cantabrian Sierra. It is watered by several creeks and is surrounded by lush vineyards from which the majority of local income is made. From its origin until the year 1630 it was a part of the jurisdiction of Laguardia, and in 1630 it obtained the title of town. The first documented appearance of the municipality is in the year 1257 and in 1366 its demographic information is first documented, being a part of the kingdom of Navarre.

== Notable people ==
- Sebastián Iradier (1809–1865), Spanish Basque composer who wrote the song La Paloma
