= Sebastián Iradier =

Spanish Basque composer

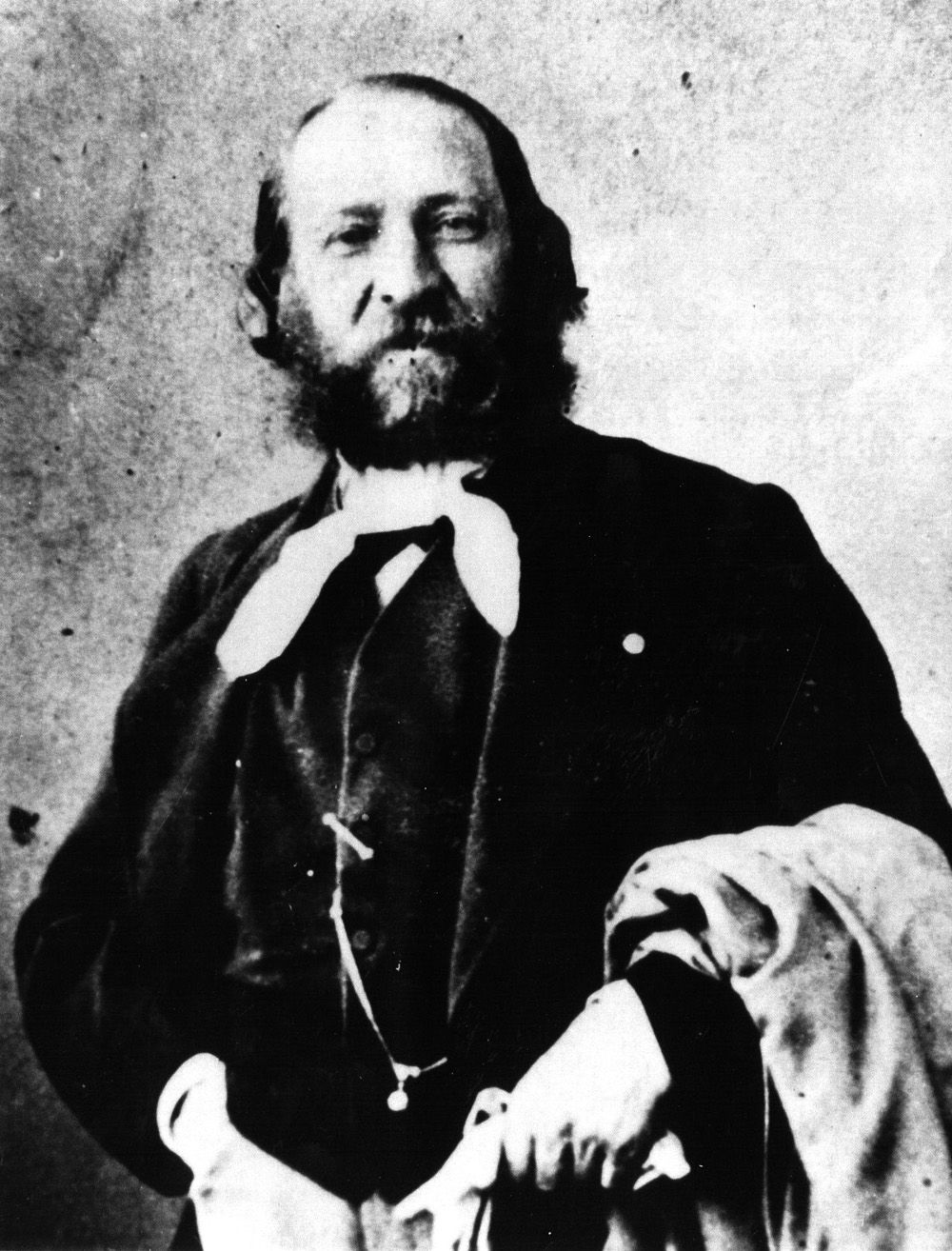
Sebastián Iradier

Sebastián Iradier Salaverri (Salaberri) (20 January 1809 – 6 December 1865), or Sebastián Yradier, was a Spanish Basque composer.

== Biography ==
Iradier was born in Lanciego, in the province of Álava. His publisher in Paris urged him to "universalize" his name, from Iradier to Yradier. His only daughter was Matilde.

He is known primarily for his habaneras, especially the one titled "La Paloma", written around 1860 after a visit to Cuba. "La Paloma" was extremely popular in both Spain and the Americas (especially Mexico), where it was responsible for the great popularity achieved by the habanera. Radio Universidad Nacional Autónoma de México (UNAM) has estimated that there are more than one thousand versions of "La Paloma", and said that, together with "Yesterday" by The Beatles, it is one of the most recorded songs in the history of music.

Another of Iradier's compositions is "El Arreglito", a habanera used by Georges Bizet in his opera Carmen. Bizet, thinking it was a folk song, was inspired by the melody, and recomposed it as the aria "L'amour est un oiseau rebelle", also known as the "Habanera". When he discovered his mistake, Bizet added a note to the vocal score of the opera, acknowledging its source.

Iradier died in obscurity in Vitoria-Gasteiz in 1865.
