= Spanish tinge =

Afro-Latin rhythms in jazz

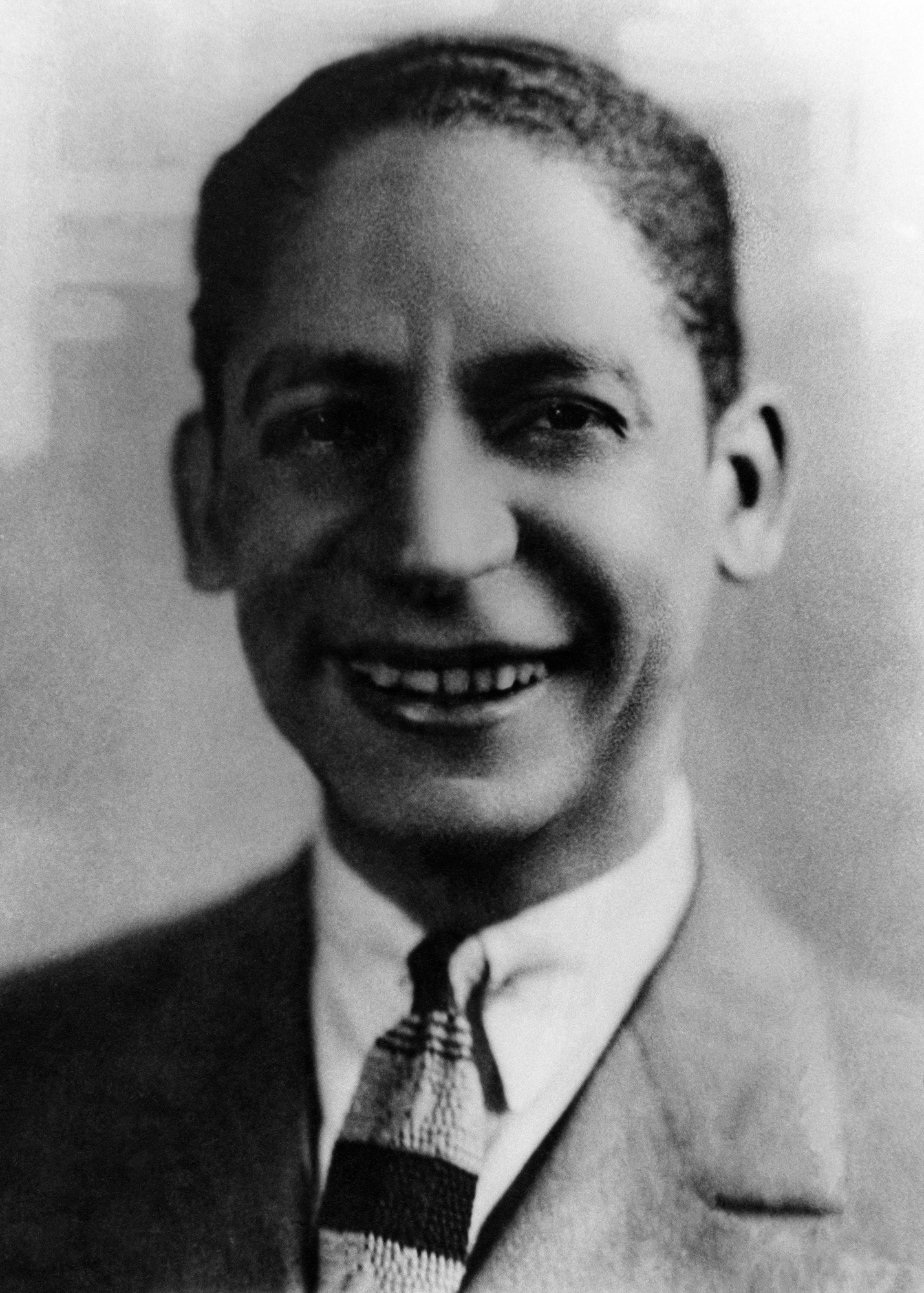
Jelly Roll Morton in 1927

The Spanish tinge is an Afro-Latin rhythmic touch that spices up the more conventional 4/4 rhythms commonly used in jazz and pop music. The phrase is a quotation from Jelly Roll Morton. In his Library of Congress recordings, after referencing the influence of his own French Creole culture in his music, he noted the Spanish presence:

Then we had Spanish people there. I heard a lot of Spanish tunes. I tried to play them in correct tempo, but I personally didn't believe they were perfected in the tempos. Now take the habanera "La Paloma", which I transformed in New Orleans style. You leave the left hand just the same. The difference comes in the right hand – in the syncopation, which gives it an entirely different color that really changes the color from red to blue. Now in one of my earliest tunes, "New Orleans Blues", you can notice the Spanish tinge. In fact, if you can't manage to put tinges of Spanish in your tunes, you will never be able to get the right seasoning, I call it, for jazz.

Top: tresillo rhythm. Bottom: habanera rhythm

What Morton called "Spanish" were the tresillo and Contradanza, Morton demonstrated the "tinge" to Alan Lomax in the 1938 Library of Congress recordings. What is known in Latin music as the Contradanza rhythm is also known as the congo, tango-congo, and tango.

Morton categorized his compositions in three groups: blues, stomps, and Spanish tinge, for those with habanera rhythms. Tunes with the "tinge" include "New Orleans Blues" (a.k.a. "New Orleans Joys"), "La Paloma", "The Crave", and "The Spanish Tinge". Morton also called attention to the Contradanza in "Saint Louis Blues" as one of the elements in the song's success.

== See also ==
- Latin music in the United States
