= John Storm Roberts =

British ethnomusicologist and record producer

John Storm Roberts (February 24, 1936 – November 29, 2009) was a British-born, U.S.-based ethnomusicologist, writer and record producer. He is best known as the co-founder of Original Music, a mail-order company that distributed world music books and records.

== Life ==
John Anthony Storm Roberts was born in London, England. Roberts grew up listening to jazz, blues, calypso and flamenco records that his father brought back from business trips abroad. After graduating from Oxford University, Roberts wrote for the East African Standard in Kenya and developed an intimate knowledge of African music. In the late 1960s, he produced programs about African music for the BBC World Service. Roberts moved to the United States in 1970, where he was an editor for Africa Report.

In 1972, Roberts traveled to the Caribbean Islands to make field recordings of traditional music, which were released as Caribbean Island Music: Songs and Dances of Haiti, The Dominican Republic and Jamaica on Nonesuch Records as part of their Explorer Series.

In 1972, he published Black Music of Two Worlds, which explored the impact that both African and European cultures had on music of the Americas. In his next book, The Latin Tinge (1979), Roberts wrote "virtually all of the major popular forms — Tin Pan Alley, stage and film music, jazz, rhythm-and-blues, country music, rock — have been affected throughout their development by the idioms of Brazil, Cuba, or Mexico."

In 1982, Roberts and his wife, Anne Needham, founded Original Music, a mail order company that distributed world music books and records written and produced by Roberts.

== Death ==
Roberts died in Kingston, New York, on November 29, 2009.

== Books ==
- A Land Full of People: Life in Kenya Today (1967)
- Black Music of Two Worlds: African, Caribbean, Latin, and African-American Traditions (1972)
- The Latin Tinge: The Impact of Latin American Music on the United States (1979)
- Latin Jazz: The First of the Fusions, 1880s to Today (1999)
