= Cell (music) =

Rhythmic or melodic unit in music

The 1957 Encyclopédie Larousse defines a cell in music as a "small rhythmic and melodic design that can be isolated, or can make up one part of a thematic context". The cell may be distinguished from the figure or motif: the 1958 Encyclopédie Fasquelle defines a cell as "the smallest indivisible unit", unlike the motif, which may be divisible into more than one cell. "A cell can be developed, independent of its context, as a melodic fragment, it can be used as a developmental motif. It can be the source for the whole structure of the work; in that case it is called a generative cell."

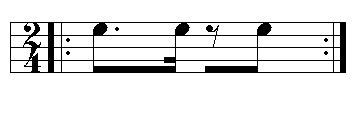
Tresillo, a rhythmic cell of the tango and habanera.

A rhythmic cell is a cell without melodic connotations. It may be entirely percussive or applied to different melodic segments.

== History ==
The term "cell" (German: Keim) derives from organic music theorists of the nineteenth century. Arnold Schering adopted the term, along with "melodic kernels" (Melodiekerne) in his analysis of 14th-century madrigal, one of the first uses of Gestalt psychology in music theory.

== See also ==
- Clave (rhythm)
- Hauptrhythmus
- Ostinato
- Vamp
