= Timba =

Cuban genre of music

- Stylistic origins: Son Cubano - Son montuno - Songo - Nueva trova - Afro-Cuban jazz - Salsa - Funk - Disco
- Cultural origins: 1988, Cuba

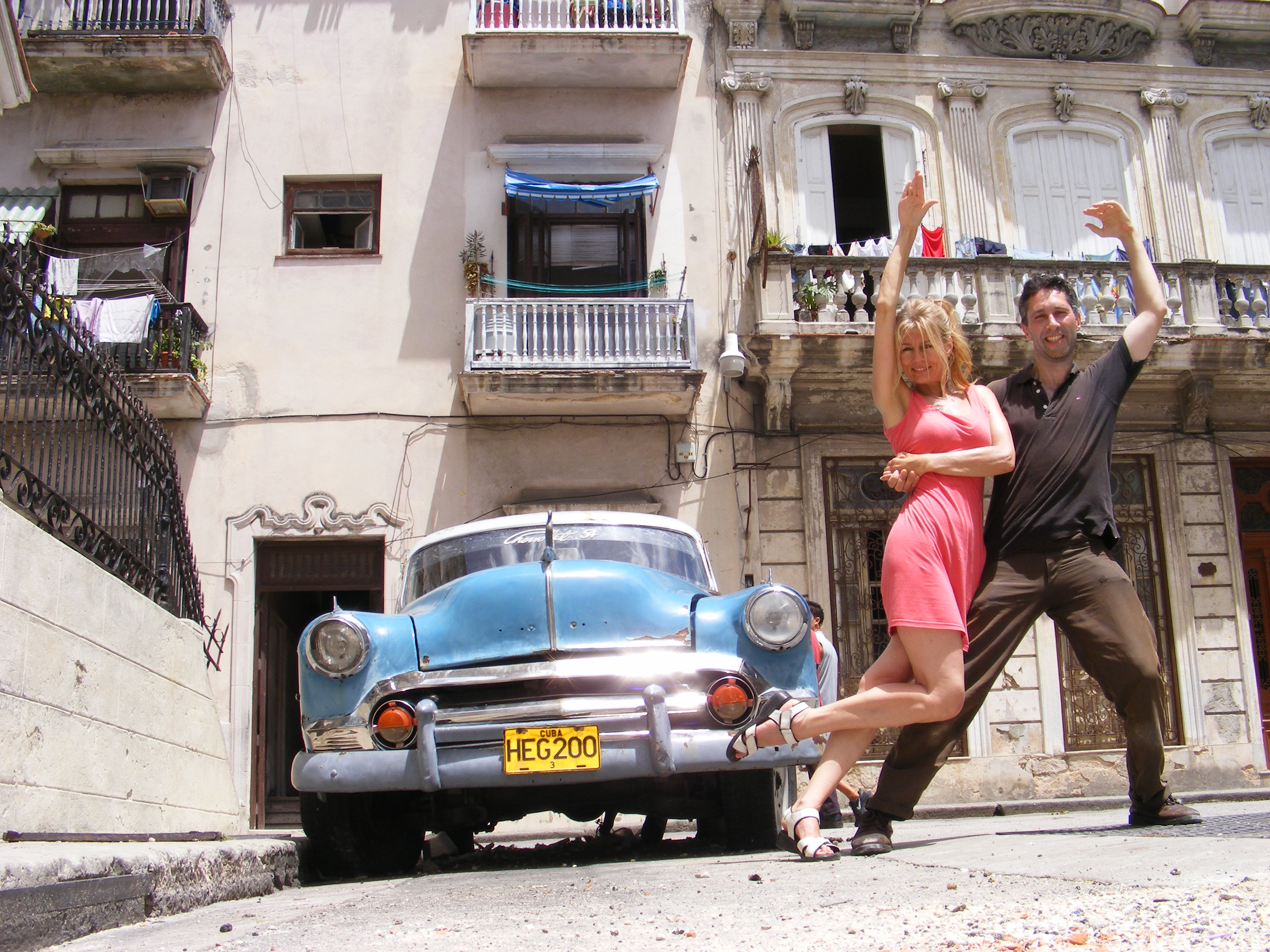
Cuban salsa dancers in Havana.

Timba is a Cuban genre of music based on Cuban son with salsa, American Funk-Pop/R&B and the strong influence of Afro-Cuban folkloric music. Timba rhythm sections differ from their salsa counterparts, because timba emphasizes the bass drum, which is not used in salsa bands. Timba and salsa use the same tempo range and they both use the standard conga marcha. Almost all timba bands have a trap drummer. Timbas also often break the basic tenets of arranging the music in-clave. Timba is considered to be a highly aggressive type of music, with rhythm and "swing" taking precedence over melody and lyricism. Associated with timba is a radically sexual and provocative dance style known as despelote (literally meaning chaos or frenzy). It is a dynamic evolution of salsa, full of improvisation and Afro Cuban heritage, based on son, Rumba and mambo, taking inspiration from Latin jazz, and is highly percussive with complex sections. Timba is more flexible than salsa and includes a more diverse range of styles. Timba incorporates heavy percussion and rhythms which originally came from the barrios of Cuba.

== Etymology ==
The word timba is part of a large family of mb and ng words that made their way into Spanish from African languages. Among the hundreds of other examples are tumba, rumba, marimba, kalimba, mambo, conga, and bongo. — Moore (2010: v. 5: 11).

Before it became the newest Cuban music and dance craze, timba was a word with several different uses yet no particular definition, mostly heard within the Afro-Cuban genre of rumba. A timbero was a complimentary term for a musician, and timba often referred to the collection of drums in a folklore ensemble. Since the 1990s, timba has referred to Cuba's intense and slightly more aggressive music and dance form.

At least as far back as 1943, the word timba was used in lyrics and song titles such as Casino de la Playa's "Timba Timbero" and Pérez Prado's "Timba Timba". It's also the name of a neighborhood in Havana. It came into use as a music genre name, first as timba brava, around 1988. Many, most famously NG La Banda's leader José Luis "El Tosco" Cortés, claim credit for being the first to use it to describe the new musical phenomenon—Moore (2010: v. 5: 11).

== History ==
As opposed to salsa, whose roots are strictly from son and the Cuban conjunto bands of the 1940s and 1950s, timba represents a synthesis of many folkloric (rumba, guaguancó, batá drumming and the sacred songs of santería.), and popular sources (even taking inspiration from non Afro-Cuban musical genres such as rock, jazz, funk, and Puerto Rican folk). According to Vincenzo Perna, author of Timba: The Sound of the Cuban Crisis, timba needs to be spoken of because of its musical, cultural, social, and political reasons; its sheer popularity in Cuba, its novelty and originality as a musical style, the skill of its practitioners, its relationship with both local traditions and the culture of the black Diaspora, its meanings, and the way its style brings to light the tension points within society. In addition to timbales, timba drummers make use of the drum set, further distinguishing the sound from that of mainland salsa. The use of synthesised keyboard is also common. Timba songs tend to sound more innovative, experimental and frequently more virtuosic than salsa pieces; horn parts are usually fast, at times even bebop influenced, and stretch to the extreme ranges of all instruments. Bass and percussion patterns are similarly unconventional. Improvisation is commonplace.

=== Precursors ===
The main precursors of timba are three bands: Los Van Van, Irakere (both in the 1970s) and NG La Banda (1988), though many other bands (e.g. Son 14, Orquesta Original de Manzanillo, Ritmo Oriental, Orquesta Revé) were influential in setting new standards.

==== Orquesta Revé ====
Elio Revé Matos was a Cuban musician and songwriter, a noted percussionist, born 23 June 1930 in Guantánamo. In 1956, he formed Elio Revé y su Charangón aka Orquesta Revé. Revé's Charanga included Trombones and Batá drum and he became known as the Father of Changüí for his contribution to that musical genre. In the 1970s, directed by timbalero Revé, Orquesta Revé saw innovations in timbales playing.

Elio Revé Sr. was an incomparable talent scout. He may also have been a difficult man to work for, if the number of musicians who have left his band is any indication! The incredible legacy of famous Revé spinoff bands began shortly after his group relocated from Guantanamo to Havana in 1956. In 1958, most of the members left to form Ritmo Oriental. In 1965, his young pianist Chucho Valdés left to pursue a jazz career, which resulted in the formation of Irakere. In 1968, bassist, Juan Formell, Pupy Pedroso and others left to form Los Van Van. In the late 70s, Armando Gola, German Velazco and Pepe Maza left to form Orquesta 440. Singer Félix Baloy left after 1982 and enjoyed a long career with Adalberto Álvarez and as a solo artist. Arranger Ignacio Herrera also left after 1982. We are not sure what happened to Herrera, but based on his stunning arrangements on the 1982 album, he certainly had the potential to create a brilliant spinoff band of his own. Another "missing-in-action" Revé alumnus who might well extended to this list was Tony García, the pianist and musical director of the early 1990s and the arranger of Revé famous "Mi salsa tiene sandunga" which became the theme song of Cuba television's most important music show, Mi Salsa.

It was Herrera's departure that led Revé to focus his talent scouting spotlight on another composer and arranger Juan Carlos Alfonso. Alfonso is also the brilliant pianist whose tumbaos will be studied in this section. After five years and four classic albums which elevated Revé to Van Van-like popularity and earned them the nickname La explosión del momento, Alfonso himself left the band in 1988 to form Dan Den... Suffice it to say that the history of Revé is like the corner of Hollywood and Vine if you study it carefully enough, you'll encounter most of the important Cuban musicians of the last 50 years in the process.—Moore (2010: v. 4: 49)

Others associated with Revé included the singer Yumurí. Elio was the father of musician brothers, Oderquis Reve and Elio jr (Elito), the latter continuing a direct link to his father's music with Elito Revé y su Charangón. Singer and writer, Emilio Frías “El Niño”, gained experience with the group before forming El Niño y La Verdad in June 2013.

==== Son 14 ====
Grandes Èxitos EGREM CD 0325 (Son 14). This CD is an excellent compilation of the best songs of Son 14 during the years in which Adalberto Álvarez led the band (1979–1983)

Adalberto Álvarez, born in Havana and raised in Camagüey, had already had some success writing songs for Rumbavana when Rodulfo Vaillant, one of the most recorded composers of the era, invited him come to Santiago as the musical director and pianist of a new group called Son 14. The group got off to a roaring start in 1979 with Adalberto's first massive hit, "A Bayamo en coche." Alvarez left after three classic albums (plus a fourth featuring Omara Portuondo singing songs from the other three) but Son 14 has stayed together, recording sporadically, under the leadership of Eduardo "Tiburón" Morales, the original singer of "A Bayamo en coche."

Adalberto Álvarez was among the first to popularize the use of "gospel" chord progressions using major triads built on II, III and VI. Throughout the 1970s and 80s, more and more elements of the pop music harmonic palette became acceptable in Latin music and by the 1990s, anything that produced a hook became fair game, resulting in an explosion of brilliant songwriting while North American salsa continued to be constrained by the formulaic limitations of the genre.—Moore (2010: v. 4: 22)

==== Orquesta Ritmo Oriental ====
Ritmo Oriental, often known as "La Ritmo", was one of the most popular bands in Cuba in the 1970s and 1980s. ... La Ritmo's violin tumbaos were endlessly inventive and Humberto Perera, often the arranger as well as the bassist, created bass tumbaos which were both thematic and filled the holes created by the other tumbaos. Pianist Luis Adolfo Peoalver mostly stayed within the typical style of the 1970s and 80s, locking down the groove with the violin section and Lazaga's machete-style güiro, while Perera, drummer Daniel Díaz, conguero Juan Claro Bravo and the band's extraordinary arrangers soared to unprecedented creative heights.—Moore (2010: v. 3: 33)

==== Original de Manzanillo ====
Original de Manzanillo added guitar to the standard charanga instrumentation. Less adventurous than Ritmo Oriental and the other modern charangas, it was distinguished primarily by its singer and composer, Candido Fabré, an extraordinary performer who influenced almost every subsequent singer with his uncanny ability to improvise lyrics. Original de Manzanillo's pianist and leader Wilfredo "Pachy" Naranjo is still with the group and his son, Pachy Jr., is the current pianist for Orquesta Revé and has recorded with many others, including Angel Bonne.—Moore (2010: v. 3: 33)

==== Los Van Van ====
In 1969, Formell left Revé to form his own band, Los Van Van, taking with him many of Revé's musicians, including pianist Pupy Pedroso. His first new songs bore much in common with the music he created for Revé although he began calling it songo instead of changüí.—Moore (2010: v. 3: 16)

Los Van Van developed what came to be known as the 'songo' genre, making countless innovations to traditional son, both in style and orchestration. In Latin music, genres are commonly attributed to rhythms (though of course not every rhythm is a genre), and whether or not timba is a genre of its own is debatable. Songo, however, can be considered to be a genre and is in all likelihood the only genre in the world played by only one orchestra, Los Van Van. The songo rhythm was created by percussionist José Luís Quintana ("Changuito"), at the behest of Van Van bandleader Juan Formell. Since the band's creation in 1969, Los Van Van has been the most popular band in Cuba, and are themselves considered to be one of the major timba bands.

==== Irakere ====
Irakere is known largely as a Latin jazz band outside Cuba, yet much of their music can be considered to be popular dance music. Like Los Van Van, Irakere experimented with many different styles, mixing Afro-Cuban rhythms with son and jazz. While bandleader Chucho Valdés is revered as one of the great jazz musicians of Cuba, both jazz and timba prodigies came out of the orchestra, including flutist José Luis Cortés ("El Tosco"), who assembled a group of highly talented musicians to form NG La Banda in the mid-1980s. NG experimented with different styles, including Latin jazz, for several years, before recording what is considered by many to be the first timba album, En La Calle, in 1989.

=== Special Period (early 1990s) ===
During the Special Period of the early 1990s, timba became a significant form of expression for the cultural and social upheaval that occurred. The Special Period was a time of economic downfalls and hardships for the Cuban people. In the wake of the dissolution of the Soviet Union, Cuba's main trading partner, the country experienced its worse crisis since the revolution. Cuba now opened its doors to tourism, and the influx of tourists to the island helped broaden the appeal of the music and dance of timba. The stand-off between Cuba and most of the rest of the world gave timba space to breathe new life into the city, causing the nightlife and party scene to grow. Timba's danceable beat and energizing sound was popular among the tourists at a time when the music and dance scene was indirectly helping provide some support for Cuba's struggling economy.

While timba developed at the beginning of a decade when Afro-Cuban conservatory graduates were turning to popular music catering to inner-city youth, its growth followed that of the music and tourist industries, as the state tried to address the economic challenges of the post-Soviet world. Timba lyrics generated considerable controversy due to their use of vulgar and witty street language, and also because they made veiled references to public concerns including prostitution, crime, and the effects of tourism on the island, which had only rarely been addressed by other musicians. This was not normal in Cuban texts before. There was also a reaffirmation of the Cuban identity. The difference of opinion between the old traditionalists going abroad for success and the young bloods stuck at home – and the difference in financial rewards – was bound to lead to friction. In the subsequent time, timba has largely crossed over from an accessible, mainstream medium to one that is directed at wealthy elites in high-end venues. This places timba in contrast with rap, which has come in some ways to fill the role of the music of the masses.

=== NG La Banda ===
Though NG La Banda had huge successes in the early 1990s, and is credited with being the first timba band, the band's fortunes have been mixed, partly because they remain highly experimental.

NG La Banda, usually considered the first timba band, was among the first groups to standardize the use of gears and song-specific piano tumbaos, as well as being the first in a series of bands to experience "mania"-like popularity in Havana during the heady days of the 1990s.

In terms of its members, however, NG La Banda was far from new. They had already been playing under the name "Nueva Generación", recording several eclectic jazz albums. Five members came directly from Irakere: the leader, José Luis "El Tosco" Cortés, and the entire horn section, known affectionately to fans as Los metales de terror for their flawless and aggressive execution of El Tosco's virtuosic hornlines ... El Tosco [had a] stint in the 1970s with Los Van Van. His initial concept for NG La Banda was to combine the popular music appeal of Los Van Van with the jazz influences and stupendous musicianship of Irakere.

The rhythm section was no less virtuosic than the horns. Drummer Calixto Oviedo, Bassist Feliciano Arango, drummer Giraldo Piloto and conguero Wickly Nogueras went on to become legends on their respective instruments. Most important from our point of view was the pianist Rodulfo "Peruchín" Argudín.

The original singers were Tony Calla and Issac Delgado, from Ritmo Oriental and Pachito Alonso, respectively. Delgado left NG to form his own band in about 1991. Piloto joined him about a year later as drummer, composer and musical director. El Tosco replaced Issac with another great singer, Antonio Mena.—Moore (2010: v. 5: 14)

=== La Charanga Habanera ===
What came to be known as the "timba explosion" started not with NG La Banda, but with the debut album of La Charanga Habanera, "Me Sube La Fiebre", in 1992. This album included all the elements of what is now known as timba, and the band dominated the scene until the break-up of the original band in 1998 (they have since reformed).

Charanga Habanera was ... catapulted to superstar status in the 1990s. Like NG La Banda, the charangueros had copious amounts of gear changes, song-specific tumbaos and attitude, but their musical style was drastically different and it kept changing and evolving with each album. Charanga Habanera's albums can be bought in their original form, which is fortunate because they're conceived as albums, with meticulous attention paid to artwork, track lists, and overall concept. Every note on these albums holds up under intense scrutiny. I've written extensive articles on each of the first five albums on www.timba.com and I've begun another, more technical batch of analyses of the same albums from the point of view of the rhythm section and its gear changes. Charanga Habanera's timba.com section also includes extremely accurate transcriptions of every lyric, including guías, on each of these albums.

In terms of instrumentation, Charanga Habanera is about as far from being a charanga as it could possibly be, and there's an interesting story behind the band's misleading name. The group's leader, David Calzado, who had played violin for Ritmo Oriental in the 1980s, landed a multi-year contract to play traditional charanga music each summer at a large Monte Carlo tourist hotel, hence the then-appropriate band name Charanga Habanera. Every weekend, the band would play the opening set for touring bands such as Earth, Wind and Fire, Stevie Wonder, James Brown and Kool & The Gang, and the charangueros became huge fans of both the music and stage shows of North American R&B. In the off-season, back in Cuba, there was very little work for their traditional music and the whole country was going wild for NG La Banda. In response, Calzado and musical director/pianist Juan Carlos Gonzalez changed everything about Charanga Habanera except the name. They added three trumpets and a sax, a bongosero, a kick drum, a synthesizer, elaborate costumes and stage shows, and a completely new kind of music which didn't sound like NG La Banda or Earth, Wind and Fire, but which worked pure musical magic on all levels. The piano tumbaos and arrangements ... were nothing short of sublime.

Charanga Habanera underwent three distinct style periods in the 1993–1997 period, represented by the three albums pictured above. An earlier album, Love Fever (Me sube la fiebre), fits stylistically with Hey You Loca and even shares two important songs : Me sube la fiebre and Para el llanto. If you catch Charanga fever, there are three important classics on Love Fever that weren't re-recorded on Hey You Loca: "Extraños ateos", "Pregón de chocolate" and "Te voy a liquidar."—Moore (2010: v. 5: 16)

Since then a large number of bands have sprung up in Cuba and internationally, many of the best known being headed or staffed by former members of the above-mentioned bands. Some important figures and bands include: Pachito Alonso y sus Kini Kini, Azúcar Negra, Bamboleo, Charanga Forever, Dan Den, Alain Pérez, Issac Delgado, Tirso Duarte, Klímax, Manolín "El Médico de la salsa", Manolito y su Trabuco, Paulo FG, and Pupy y Los que Son, Son (directed by César "Pupy" Pedroso, former pianist of Los Van Van).

=== Manolín "El Médico de la salsa" ===
If the early 1990s popularity of NG La Banda and Charanga Habanera was unprecedented, the response to the arrival of the next superstar group bordered on the unbelievable: the Cuban equivalent of Beatlemania. The unlikely star was Manuel "Manolín" Gonzalez, an amateur songwriter whom NG's El Tosco discovered at med school and famously dubbed "El Médico de la Salsa". Manolín's music was as different from Charanga Habanera as Charanga Habanera was from NG La Banda. His creative team included several arrangers, including the great Luis Bu, a brilliant pianist, Chaka Nápoles ... and an incredibly powerful and creative rhythm section. As influential as Manolín was from a strictly musical point of view, his charisma, popularity and unprecedented earning power had an even more seismic impact, causing a level of excitement among musicians that had not been seen since the 1950s, if ever. To borrow a phrase from Reggie Jackson, El Médico de la Salsa was "the straw that stirs the drink."—Moore (2010: v. 5: 18)

=== Paulito FG ===
Paulo Fernández Gallo, aka Paulito FG, Pablo FG or Paulo FG, joined Issac Delgado and Manolìn as the three top singer-bandleaders of the 1990s. The other major bands of the era, from Los Van Van to Bamboleo, were led by musicians and featured a "front line" of two to four lead singers who took turns singing lead while the others sang coro. Paulito's vocal style is characterized by razor-sharp accuracy and an ability to reinvent the melodies of his compositions with each performance. Like a basketball point guard he was able to call gear changes spontaneously and only Issac Delgado's band was able to vary their performances as much from night to night. Paulito's band, the "Elite", was indeed an elite force, with the best or one of the best players in Havana on nearly every instrument. Many of the members had stayed on from the Opus 13 days. Paulito wrote almost all of his material and had a brilliant chemistry with arranger Juan Ceruto and his all-star rhythm section, resulting in some of the most intricate and original arrangements of the 1990s. Aesthetically, Paulito's music seems to share a kinship with Manolín's but from our point of view a more useful comparison is with Delgado. Delgado's and Paulito's were arguably the greatest live timba bands from the point of view of being able to use gears and improvisation to make each performance of a song different from one concert to the next. Each group had wonderfully complex and flexible gear systems, and each had a string of brilliant pianists. Many of the top pianists played in both bands at different points. Paulito's pianists were Emilio Morales, Sergio Noroña, Pepe Rivero, Yaniel "El Majá" Matos, Rolando Luna, and Roberto "Cucurucho" Carlos. Delgado's were Tony Pérez, Melón Lewis, Pepe Rivero, Yaniel "El Maja" Matos, Roberto "Cucurucho" Carlos, Rolando Luna and Tony Rodríguez.—Moore (2010: v. 5: 20)

=== Manolito y su Trabuco ===
Manolito y su Trabuco's front line has included some of the best singers of the era, including Rosendo "El Gallo" Díaz, Sixto "El Indio" Llorente (who sang many of the Orquesta Aliamén ... and Carlos Kalunga, who sang many of the recommended Klímax songs in the previous section. Manolito's 1990s recordings also feature one of the best and most thoughtful synthesizer players, Osiris Martínez, who now plays with Los Que Son Son. Manolito has a great musical chemistry with the groupís other prolific composer, singer Ricardo Amaray. Many of Trabuco's biggest hits result from Amaray's unabashed R&B influences being filtered through Simonet's strong Cuban aesthetic and arranging genius. Like Issac Delgado, Manolito made CDs that mixed the aggressive hardcore timba he played in concert with various other styles designed to appeal to foreign buyers cumbias targeting South American audiences for example. Manolito's many timba masterpieces are spread across his 17-year discography a few on each album.—Moore (2010: v. 5: 22)

=== Bamboleo ===
Like Manolín, Bamboleo began life as one of El Tosco's pet projects. Led by pianist Lázaro Valdés Jr., one of timba's most original arrangers, they have an instantly recognizable sound, with R&B and jazz fusion elements seamlessly integrated with aggressive timba, and a complex system of hand signals that allow bloques to be spontaneously built from smaller units. Only Issac Delgado and Paulito FG surpass Bamboleo in terms of using gear changes to vary live performances from night to night.–Moore (2010: v. 5: 23)

=== Klímax ===
Klímax leader Giraldo Piloto is one of the most important figures in all of Cuban music history. His father and namesake was half of the great songwriting team of Piloto y Vera and his uncle was the legendary percussionist Guillermo Barreto. Surpassing both famous relatives, Piloto won the timba.com readers poll for Best Timba Drummer and came in fourth for Best Songwriter. He left NG La Banda because it didnít afford him enough opportunity to write. As a freelancer he wrote three important songs for Charanga Habanera, including their breakthrough hit, "Me sube la fiebre." After joining Issac, he continued to write prolifically. When Piloto founded Klímax in 1995 his writing became even more melodically, harmonically and lyrically original, sometimes straying into controversial areas that resulted in songs being censored by the government and always pushing the envelope of musical creativity in wonderful and varied ways. Klímax is the most harmonically original and sophisticated popular music band in Cuban history.—Moore (2010: v. 5: 21)

=== Bakuleye ===
Bakuleye, known as a magic wand that awakens a deity living under the Earth, is another popular band in Cuba known for its timba. The band's creator, Pedro Pablo Vargas, describes Bakuleye as the awakening of new ideas. The music of Bakuleye is a fusion of different musical rhythms such as Latin jazz, boleros, ballads, bachata, and especially salsa. As one of the most promising groups from Cuba, Bakuleye has received favorable press and television coverage.

=== Outside Cuba ===
Other than in Cuba, a few timba bands appeared in Miami, Florida, where a large concentration of Cuban-Americans reside. This became possible due to members of some timba bands moving to Miami, such as Isaac Delgado, Manolín "El Médico de la Salsa", Dany Lozada (former singer and composer for Charanga Habanera), and Pepito Gómez (former singer in Pupy y Los que Son, Son) but eventually decided to relocate elsewhere (to Spain, Mexico, and New York). Others include Carlos Manuel, El Pikete, Michel Calvo, Jorge Gomez and "Tiempo Libre" (who received Grammy nominations in 2005 for their album "Arroz con Mango" and in 2006 for their album "Lo que esperabas"), Los 10 de la Salsa, Chaka and his group "El Tumbao", and Tomasito Cruz and his Cuban Timba All Stars.

In Peru, timba is also prominent with no fewer than 30 bands dedicated to promote Cuban music, the most well known of which are Mayimbe and Team Cuba. Others include: Mangu, Camagüey, A Conquistar, Explosión Habana, N'Samble, La Novel, D'Farándula, Bembe, Son de Timba, Los Trabucos, Yambú and Yare. Also, Lima is hometown for Cuban musicians such as Dantes Cardosa and Michel Maza (former lead singer for Charanga Habanera) and Caroband.

== Stylistic aspects ==
=== Dance and culture ===
In the broadest sense, people dance timba in a style called "casino" that was around well before 1989, but certain rhythmic elements of timba arrangements inspired new ways of dancing. In some cases, dancers would respond to changes in the music by switching between casino and the new dance styles, providing perhaps the strongest single argument for the claim that timba is an independent genre and not simply "modern son montuno" or "Cuban salsa."—Moore (2010: v. 5: 11).

=== Harmony ===
The groups of the early 1970s opened the door to the idea of using new harmonies in Cuban music: rock and soul in the case of Los Van Van; jazz and classical music in the case of Irakere and their followers. In the 1980s there was a general trend for harmonies to become more traditional and less eclectic, but even the principal architects of this trend, such as Adalberto Álvarez, added new harmonic ideas like secondary dominants and inverted triads. In any case, the timberos crashed through this partially open door and never looked back. In terms of the actual chord progressions used in timba, the harmony appendix is also very useful. A highly recommended exercise is to play through the whole list in the key of C. As dramatically different as timba harmonies sound after studying the music of the first four volumes, it ís surprising to see how many timba tumbaos recycle the same progressions with minor variations. While the first decade of the 2000s has witnessed a general simplification of harmonies not unlike the 1980s after the 1970s there are still vast untapped opportunities for further harmonic exploration. Hopefully readers of these books will be among the future explorers.—Moore (2010: v. 5: 11, 12).

=== Arranging ===
The 1990s witnessed dramatic innovations at every level of hierarchy from the tumbaos, to the sections built over repetitions of those tumbaos, to the way the sections were combined in the overall arrangement.

Most pre-Revolution tumbaos last one clave before repeating. Two-clave tumbaos became dominant in the 1970s and 80s. By the 1990s, tumbao lengths of four claves were as common as two and sometimes extended to eight. Odd lengths such as three, five and six were also occasionally used. In this sense, timba can be seen as a continuation of the ongoing trend toward longer tumbaos, but overall length is only half of the story. Many of the tumbaos of the 70s and 80s applied a one-clave rhythm to a two-clave chord progression. With Latin jazz, and jazz-influenced salsa, the chord progression might extend to eight or even sixteen claves, but the basic rhythmic cell keeps repeating every clave. In the 1990s, even the two-clave tumbaos usually featured distinctly different rhythms for each half of the pattern.

Zooming out a level to examine the larger mambo and coro sections built from the tumbaos, we immediately encounter a new type of arranging device which is almost entirely unique to timba. I call it the "asymmetrical coro". Instead of a one- or two-clave coro followed by a lead vocal of the same length with the same progression, timba arrangers might follow a three-clave coro with a one-clave guía, a one-clave coro interjection and then a three-clave guía, all over an eight-clave chord progression. They might also provide different chord progressions for the coro and lead vocal.

The horns were also part of the new paradigm. To review, the idea of using a horn section to play repeating riffs began with the diablo sections of Arsenio Rodríguez. Arsenio usually combined a coro and a horn riff over a one-clave tumbao. By the 1980s it had become standard for each arrangement to include several such sections, now called mambos, but featuring horns alone with no vocals. The horn mambos would alternate with coro/guía sections. Timba arrangers put a dramatic end to this type of predictable, formulaic arranging. By the time Charanga Habanera's David Calzado and Juan Carlos González hit their stride in 1993, no combination of horns, guías, coros and tumbao lengths was left unexplored and the possibilities were further multiplied by accompanying the hybrid mambos with a variety of rhythm section "gears."—Moore (2010: v. 5: 12, 13).

=== Rhythms ===
Timba rhythm sections differ from their salsa counterparts in many integral ways from the instruments themselves, to the individual patterns of each instrument, to the way those patterns are combined into gears, to the way the group navigates between those gears. The areas where salsa and timba are most similar are the tempo range and the part of the largest bell, played by the bongosero in salsa and, depending on the band, by either the bongosero, timbalero or drummer in timba.

The bell played by the timbalero in salsa is sometimes played the same way by the timbalero or drummer in timba, but in timba bands where one person plays both bell patterns, a different pattern, or a much looser series of improvised patterns, is used. The time-honored standard conga marcha used universally in salsa is also often used in timba, but many other variations are also used and some congueros actually compose specific marchas for each song. Many of these timba conga marchas are twice or even four times the length of the standard conga marcha (or tumbao).

Tomás Cruz developed several adaptions of folkloric rhythms when working in Paulito FG's timba band of the 1990s. Cruz's creations offered clever counterpoints to the bass and chorus. Many of his tumbaos span two or even four claves in duration, something very rarely done previously. He also made more use of muted tones in his tumbaos, all the while advancing the development of . The example on the right is one of Cruz's inventos ('musical inventions'), a band adaptation of the Congolese-based Afro-Cuban folkloric rhythm makuta. He played the pattern on three congas on the Paulito song "Llamada anónima." Listen: "Llamada Anónima" by Paulito F.G.

A very dramatic difference between the two genres is that salsa bands don't use the kick drum, an essential element in all timba bands. Almost all timba bands have a trap drummer and those with a timbalero (e.g., Charanga Habanera) add a kick drum which he or she plays from a standing position.

The role of the bassist is also very different. Salsa bassists have standardized bombo-ponche bass tumbaos. This is sometimes used in timba, but much more often a clave-aligned tumbao is used, and it is often specific to the song in question, while the bombo-ponche tumbaos of salsa, by definition, always use the same rhythm from song to song. Most importantly, timba bassists stop and start their tumbaos, one of the defining aspects of timba gears. In salsa, the bass tumbao is omnipresent.—Moore (2010: v. 5: 13).

=== Clave schism ===
A significant aspect of the rhythmic structure of timba is the tendency towards ignoring or intentionally breaking the basic tenets of arranging the music in-clave. This had led to a schism within the world of salsa and related Latin dance music.

Some say that the new music is cruzado [incorrectly "crossed" to clave and the great art of arranging music in-clave is being lost. Others say that the young Cuban musicians are merely taking "clave license" and employing among other things, quinto-inspired concepts.

Issac Delgado's hit song "La Sandunguita" (written by Alain Pérez), is an example of an arrangement that is intentionally cruzado. The bass and chorus are in 3-2, but the bell patterns are in 2-3. ... When asked about his counter-clave (cruzado?) tumbao in "La Sandunguita", Pérez said that his inspiration came from rumba, mentioning quinto in particular:

"[The 'Sandunguita'] tumbao was a subconscious thing which ... came from rumba. In order to get this spontaneous and natural feel, you should know la rumba ... all the percussion, quinto improvising ... While we don't doubt for a minute where Pérez drew his inspiration from, it's difficult to rationalize his arrangement in terms of rumba, even taking into account the more extreme examples of counter-clave quinto phrases. Pérez doesn't attempt to rationalize his arrangement in terms of clave theory though. That's not where he's coming from. ... I just don't treat the clave as a study or a profound analysis conceived around where it overlaps and where it comes in. I didn't learn it in that way. ... When I conceive a tumbao, I don't stop and think or write to see where the clave fits and where it doesn't, ... in tumbaos developed in Cuba, you hear quinto hits ... for many years now in Cuba the bands have been employing different rhythmic patterns. It is amazing how the bass and piano have evolved in Cuba, and that is not something that stops ... the possibilities are infinite."—Pérez (2000: timba.com)

The high art of composing popular music in-clave began in Cuba and spread throughout Latin America and eventually, across the planet. Ironically, it is now the young Cuban musicians who are overtly defying the popular music conventions of composing/arranging in-clave.—Peñalosa (2009: 218).

Many salsa pianists are alarmed when they first study timba and encounter measures that either contradict the clave or fail to mark it decisively. It is an understandable concern, because when dealing with tumbaos whose rhythm patterns last only one clave, that rhythm either marks the clave or it doesn't. However, when the rhythmic pattern lasts two or four claves, it gives the creative pianist the leeway to choose where, and how strongly, to mark the clave. If you mark the clave decisively every other measure, the listeners and dancers will learn to anticipate it. As such, you can use clave polarity for artistic effect, creating tension with passages that leave the clave ambiguous or even contradict it, making the resolution to strong clave-alignment all the more satisfying when it comes" (Moore 2010: 41).

=== "Gears" ===
When a band develops a specific combination of piano, bass and percussion parts, and returns to it multiple times in multiple songs, we call this a "gear." It could be as simple as repeatedly using one groove for the cuerpos and another for the coros, or breaking down for the singer to talk to the crowd. Using this basic definition, we could say that all dance music has some sort of gear system, but the Cuban music of the 1990s took the concept to an unprecedented level of complexity and creativity. In fact, when answering the obligatory question "what's the difference between salsa and timba?", the most important part of the answer revolves around the subject of gears. The Cuban bands of the 1990s came up with a much wider spectrum of gears than their predecessors, but more importantly, many of them devised visual, verbal and/or musical signals to enable them to apply the gear changes spontaneously in different ways for different performances of the same song, i.e., to improvise the form of the piece. For example, the singer or musical director might give a hand signal or cry out "bomba!", after which the bassist would begin to slide his or her right hand down the low string of the bass in a distinctive pattern, with the percussionists simultaneously changing their patterns to a pre-determined combination that works with the bass to create the tembleque-inducing bomba groove. These "gear changes" can be written into arrangements or spontaneously invoked in live performance by hand or vocal signals.—Moore (2010: v. 5: 75)

==== Breakdowns ====
Breakdown gears set timba apart from other salsa. The following example is Calixto Oviedo's funky drumset pattern for a type of high-energy breakdown known as presión. Watch: Calixto Oviedo play presión breakdown drumset pattern

=== Compared to salsa ===
Though quite similar to salsa on the surface of things due to origins from son heritage, timba has certain qualities of its own which distinguish it from salsa, similar to the way American R&B is distinguished from soul. In general, timba is considered to be a highly aggressive type of music, with rhythm and "swing" taking precedence over melody and lyricism. Associated with timba is a radically sexual and provocative dance style known as despelote (literally meaning chaos or frenzy) that consists of rapid gyrations of the body and pelvis, thrusting and trembling motions, bending over and generating harmonic oscillations of the gluteous maximus. Those involved in the performance and popularization of timba crafted a culture of black, strong, masculine pride, and a narrative of male hypersexuality to go with timba's so-called "masculine" sound. In a socialist society where value and identity center on labor and political citizenship, black males were representing themselves not as forces of production but of pleasure. Timba is musically complex, highly danceable, and reflects the problems and contradictions of contemporary Cuban society because it expresses a repetitive beat that relates to the repetitive day-to-day life the Cubans endured during the early 1990s. It is a dynamic evolution of salsa, full of improvisation and Afro Cuban heritage, based on son, Rumba and mambo, taking inspiration from Latin jazz, and is highly percussive with complex sections. Very little "traditional" salsa existed (or exists) in Cuba, the most influential foreign 'salsero' being Venezuelan Oscar D'León, who is one of the few salsa artists to have performed in Cuba. Timba musicians thus rightly claim a different musical heritage from salsa musicians.

At its most basic, timba is more flexible and innovative than salsa, and includes a more diverse range of styles, all of which could be defined as timba. The limits of what is timba and what is not are less rigid when compared to salsa, as innovation and improvisation are key concepts in Timba music. According to Juan Formell, director of Los Van Van, timba is not a form of traditional son, but something new. Timba incorporates heavy percussion and rhythms which originally came from the barrios of Cuba.

Timba incorporates many elements of Afro-Cuban culture and music. This includes various Afro Cuban rhythms (on all instruments), expressions or parts of lyrics in 'Lucumí' (Cuban Yoruba, which were before used mostly in a religious context) and references to Afro-Cuban religion, the imperative for improvisation and interaction with audiences during concerts, story-telling in the lyrics, the quoting of melodies, rhythms and/or lyrics from other sources and sustained sections of coro-pregon (call and response) interaction in songs. Contrary to (early) salsa, timba makes no claim to social or political messages, partly because of the political circumstances in Cuba.

More specifically, timba differs from salsa in orchestration and arrangement. Some timba artists readily concede that they have occasionally taken inspiration from musical genres coming outside of Cuba. Thus, bands like La Charanga Habanera or Bamboleo often have horns or other instruments playing a few melodic notes from tunes by Earth, Wind and Fire, Kool and the Gang or other funk bands. In terms of instrumentation, the most important innovation has been the permanent incorporation of a drum kit and a synthesiser. Many timba bands have otherwise kept the traditional charanga ensemble of the 1940s, which includes double bass, conga, cowbell, clave, piano, violins, flute and in timba an expanded horn section that (in addition to the traditional trumpets and trombones) may include saxophones. However, many innovations were made in the style of playing and the arrangements, especially on the bass (sometimes taking inspiration from non Cuban genres of music), the piano (with elements of baroque music such as Bach), the horns (complex arrangements known as "champolas"), and the use of the clave (where 2-3 son clave is the standard in salsa music, timba often leans towards 2-3 rumba clave, 3:2 Son clave and 3:2 Rumba clave). Also different from salsa is the frequent shift from major to minor keys (and vice versa), the highly complex rhythmic arrangements (often based on santería or abakuá rhythms), the shifts in speed and the large number of orchestrated breaks, or "bloques". Also, owing to its many Afro Cuban origins (and, of course, to traditional Cuban music such as Son), Timba music is highly syncopated.

== Status ==
Though timba is considered to be a form of popular music, the technical mastery of timba is only possible through highly trained musicians, who have solid theoretical backgrounds in classical music, jazz, traditional Cuban music, as well as other international genres. This is made possible through the high standards of government-run music schools in Cuba, as well as the strong competition between musicians.

Government policy favours artistic excellence and Cuban music is regarded as a source of revenue and a legitimate way to attract tourism. However, the island's most popular dance bands have been virtually ignored by Latino radio in the US and some parts of Cuba, and are absent from the charts. However, pieces of Cuban sound are beginning to reach large audiences in the USA through musical recordings produced by popular musicians, such as Willy Chirino and Qbadisc, from New York City, Miami, and Puerto Rico who currently incorporate timba into their songs. New York and Puerto Rican musicians have further blended the double-hit bass drum in the breakdown in a more sophisticated way which does not exist in Cuba yet. Because of the available resources outside of Cuba, it is easier for musicians outside of the island to create music that has been heavily influenced by the Cubans. Meaning, it is easier for foreigners to imitate, create, and get their music out to the public more quickly because of the available technology.

Gonzalo Grau, La Timba Loca band leader, hopes timba will gain popularity in the States, but he realizes that only small crowds will come to shows at first. Because of the politics surrounding Cuba, the music has not had a chance to gain exposure in the States and has not become as commercialized as traditional salsa from other Latin countries. Nevertheless, many Cuban musicians seek to work abroad, and a significant number of musicians now work in exile, both in the United States and in Europe (and to a lesser extent in Latin America), leading to a new wave of cross-breeding between the timba and salsa. While timba has gone past its peak in recent years, all major groups are still actively recording and performing, and major labels—especially in Europe—have started taking an interest in timba.

Because timba is highly aggressive and a challenge to dance to some Cuban bands in search of a broader audience have intentionally made music that a majority of Latinos will find easy to dance to, mixing Latino staples such as salsa, merengue, and romantic ballads into the Cuban beat. By 1990, several bands had incorporated elements of funk and hip-hop into their arrangements, and expanded upon the instrumentation of the traditional conjunto with American drum set, saxophones and a two-keyboard format. Along with the Cuban congas and timbales, the drum set provided powerful funk and rock beats that added more punch to the rhythm section, and the bass players began to incorporate the playing techniques associated with funk, slapping, and pulling the strings in a percussive way. The combination of the trumpets and the saxes gave the horn section a more jazzed sound, and the harmony began to evolve on a more contemporary level.

Timba has start to become popular in the worldwide salsa scene today as commercial timba music selections are selectively accepted. However many salsa dancers consider it difficult to dance to, due to rapid rhythm and differential arrangements than traditional salsa and beats too strong to their ears, compounded by the strong Afro-Cubans rhythm heritage and the inability of many North American salsa dancers to listen to actual tempos. Nevertheless, it has found a niche among a growing number of fans and has been influential amongst Cuban-American and European salsa musicians. From the salsa dancer's perspective, timba (due to its rhythmically complex nature) is very hard to dance unless traditional Cuban salsa (also known as casino) is mastered and may require many years of practice. In the same way that musicians amalgamate salsa with funk, pop, jazz, rock & roll and even tango to create timba, dancing to timba reflects the rhythms/genre incorporated in the composition being danced to. Timba as a dance allows incorporation of moves seen in Afro-Cuban folklore, funk, pop, rock & roll etc., and the creation of new moves under the framework of Cuban casino.

== See also ==
- Tumbao
