= Conga =

Cuban drum

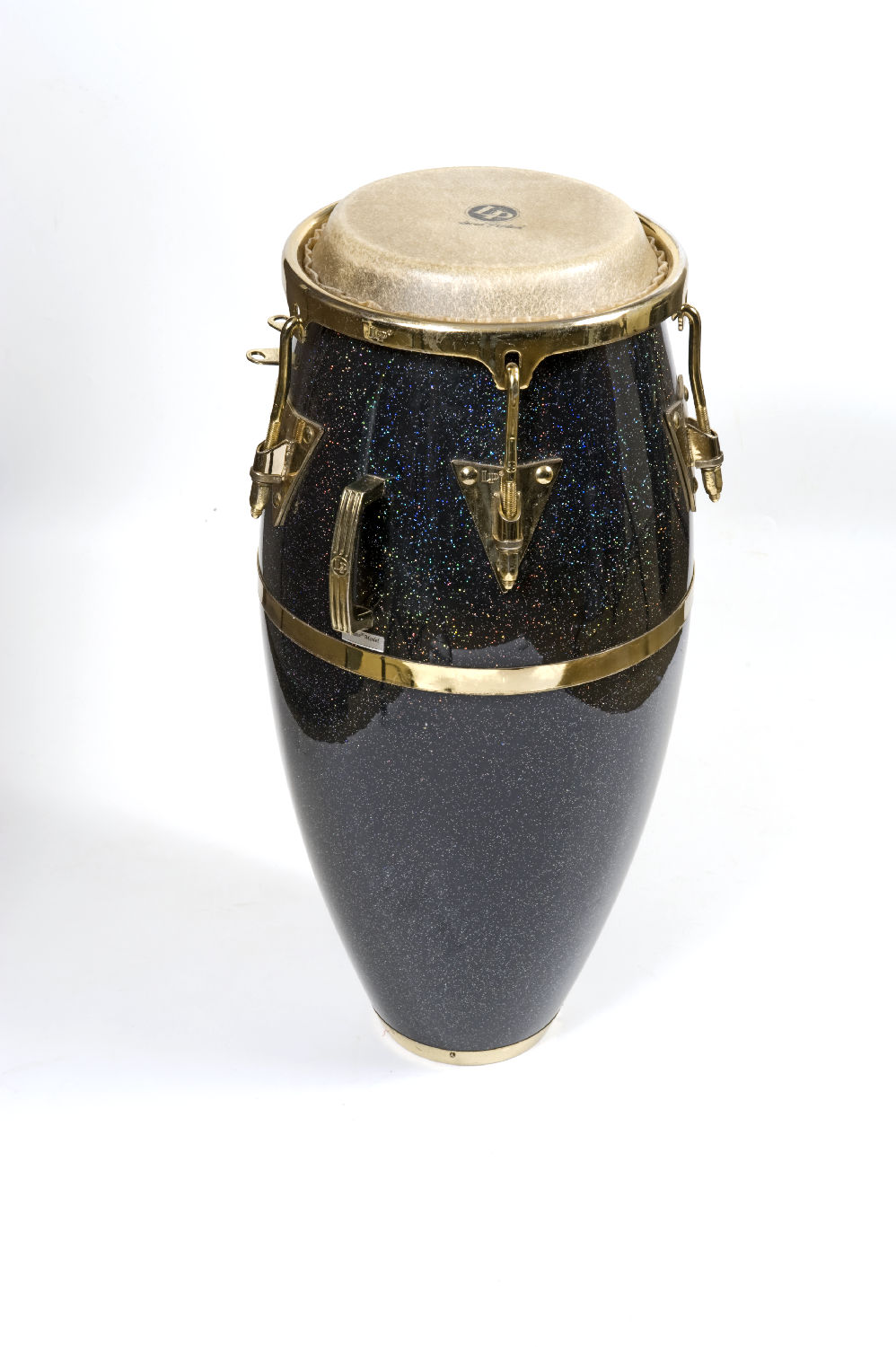
- Latin Percussion conga drum exhibited at the National Museum of World Cultures in Amsterdam

Percussion instrument
- Other names: Tumbadora
- Classification: Percussion
- Hornbostel–Sachs classification: 211.221.1 (Directly struck membranophones in which the end without a membrane is open)
- Developed: Late 19th century or early 20th century in Cuba

Related instruments
- Yuka, makuta, bembé

The conga, also known as tumbadora, is a tall, narrow, single-headed drum from Cuba. Congas are staved like barrels and classified into three types: quinto (lead drum, highest), tres dos or tres golpes (middle), and tumba or salidor (lowest). Congas were originally used in Afro-Cuban music genres such as conga (hence their name) and rumba, in which each drummer would play a single drum. Following numerous innovations in conga drumming and construction during the mid-20th century, as well as its internationalization, it became increasingly common for drummers to play two or three drums. Congas have become a popular instrument in many forms of Latin music such as son (when played by conjuntos), descarga, Afro-Cuban jazz, salsa, songo, merengue and Latin rock.

Although the exact origins of the conga drum are unknown, researchers agree that it was developed by Cuban people of African descent during the late 19th century or early 20th century. Its direct ancestors are thought to be the yuka and makuta (of Bantu origin) and the bembé drums (of Yoruba origin). In Cuba and Latin America, congas are primarily played as hand drums. In Trinidadian calypso and soca, congas are sometimes struck with mallets, while in the Congos, they are often struck with one hand and one mallet.

== Characteristics ==
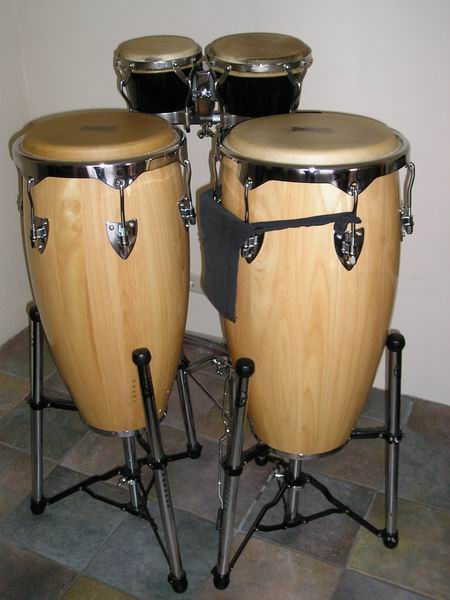
A pair of congas (front) with a pair of bongos (back) mounted on top. The combination of congas and bongos was pioneered by Cándido Camero in New York City.

Most modern congas have a staved wooden or fiberglass shell and a screw-tensioned drumhead. Since the 1950s, congas are usually played in sets of two to four, except for traditional rumba and conga, in which each drummer plays one conga. The drums are played with the fingers and palms of the hands. Typical congas stand approximately 75 centimetres (30 in) from the bottom of the shell to the head. The drums may be played while seated. Alternatively, the drums may be mounted on a rack or stand to permit the player to play while standing. While they originated in Cuba, their incorporation into the popular and folk music of other countries has resulted in diversification of terminology for the instruments and the players. In Cuba, congas are called tumbadoras.

Conga players are called congueros, while rumberos refers to those who dance following the path of the players. The term "conga" was popularized in the 1930s, when Latin music swept the United States. Cuban son and New York jazz fused together to create what was then termed mambo, but later became known as salsa. In that same period, the popularity of the conga line helped to spread this new term. Desi Arnaz also played a role in the popularization of conga drums. However, the drum he played (which everyone called a conga drum at the time) was similar to the type of drum known as bokú used in his hometown, Santiago de Cuba. The word conga came from the rhythm la conga used during carnaval (carnival) in Cuba. The drums used in carnaval could have been referred to as tambores de conga since they played the rhythm la conga, and thus translated into English as conga drums.

== Types of drum ==
Conga drums are classified according to their size, which correlates to their pitch: larger drumheads have a lower pitch and vice versa. Originally, drums were tuned by adjusting knots and tension ropes on the drumhead, or, more commonly, where the drum heads were tacked or nailed to the top of the shell, by careful heating of the head. Modern congas, developed in the early 1950s, use a screw-and-lug tension head system, which makes them easier to tune (or detune). This modern type of tension system was pioneered in Cuba by Carlos "Patato" Valdés and in the United States by Cándido Camero.

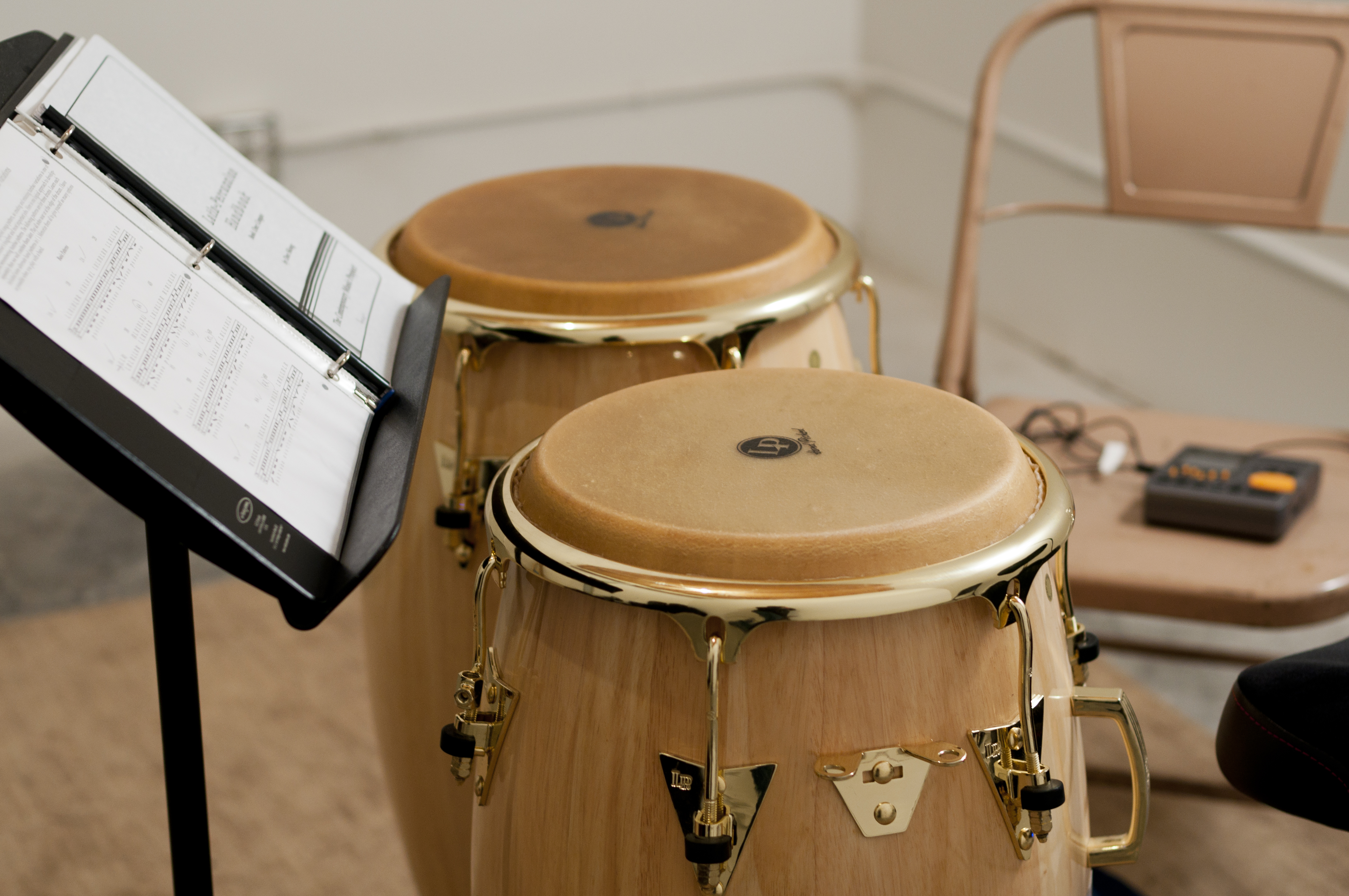
New LP Classic Congas

Historically, terminology for the drums varies between genres and countries. In ensembles that traditionally employ a large number of drums, such as comparsas and rumba groups, a detailed naming system is used, which has been taken up by major conga manufacturers. The drums are listed from largest to smallest diameter (drumhead sizes vary considerably by manufacturer, model, and style):

- The supertumba or rebajador can be as large as 14 inches (36 cm).
- The tumba or salidor is typically 12 to 12 1/2 inches (30 to 32 cm).
- The conga or tres dos is typically 11 1/2 to 12 inches (29 to 30 cm).
- The quinto is typically around 11 inches (28 cm).
- The requinto can be smaller than 10 inches (25 cm).
- The requinto chico can be as small as 9 inches (23 cm). Since this drum is typically played while hanging from a shoulder strap, it is considerably shorter and narrower than a traditional conga.

In conjuntos that play son cubano, as well as in charangas and other ensembles where one or two congas were introduced to complement other rhythmic instruments, the drums are named like the bongos: macho (male) and hembra (female), for the higher and lower-pitched drums, respectively; an additional drum would be called tercera (third). These correspond to the tumba and conga in rumba ensembles. When the quinto is played by conjuntos it retains its name.

== Tuning ==
Congas, being percussive instruments, do not have to be tuned to any particular note in purely percussive settings. However, when playing with harmonic instruments, they may be tuned to specific notes. Congas are often tuned using the open tone. In general, the particular note will depend on the make, model, and size of the conga drum. The drum should be tuned so that the bass tone resonates, the open tone rings, and the slap pierces through the musical mix. If the tuning is too loose, the bass and slap tones will sound "flabby"; too tight, and the drums will sound unnatural and "pinched". With a single drum, it is easy to tighten the drum until it makes a pleasing sound and then tighten a little more to reach a uniform desired pitch. It is very important to ensure that tuning is uniform around the drumhead, which can be checked by placing one finger pad in the center of the head and tapping the head near the edge above each lug location to detect any change, adjusting as necessary. Uniform tightness will help "let the drum speak".

Another important consideration is that head tension can greatly impact the ease or unease of the player, and generally a looser drumhead can lead to hand injury more than a tighter one, because a looser drumhead has less rebound and more muffling effect (hence potentially bruising joints and bones under spirited playing). Also, producing a crisp slap tone is nearly impossible on a loose head. During tuning it is suggested to "let the drum speak" and to conform tuning reasonably closely to the natural resonance (pitch) that the cavity of the drum interior presents. This resonance can be heard by singing or playing loud notes near the drum opening (this is true of tuning any drum) and noticing which pitch decays slowest - that will either be the fundamental (resonant) frequency or one of its simple overtones.

When two or more drums are used, there is the potential for more variation of which notes are chosen; however, tuning between or during compositions is rare in live performance. With only two drums, it is common to find them tuned a perfect fourth apart (the interval between the first two notes of "Here Comes the Bride") as is the tradition in western classical music for the timpani. Having three drums (typically the tumba, conga, and quinto) invites experimentation and individual customization. Some congueros like using the intervals of a major chord (e.g. F, A, C). Some players use the second inversion of a major chord (e.g. G, C, E); and some prefer a major second between the quinto and conga, with a perfect 4th descending to the tumba. Raul Rekow of Santana often plays five conga drums and tunes them to the opening phrase of a Latin tune.

== Playing techniques ==
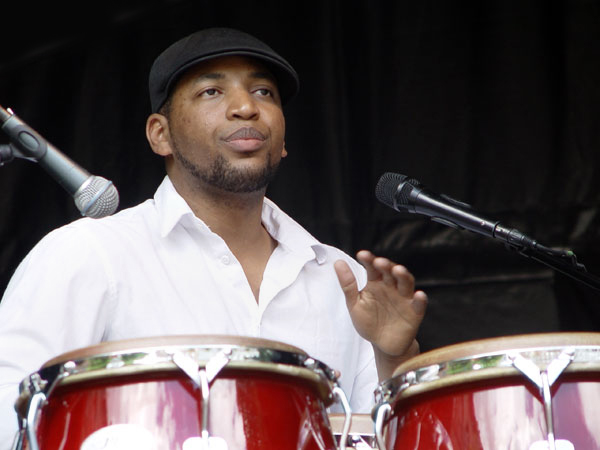
Playing three congas; one microphone is for the vocals and the other for the congas.

=== Strokes ===
==== Strokes with one hand ====
1. Tono abierto. Open tone.
2. Tono ahogado (apagado). Muffled tone.
3. Tono seco abierto. Open slap.
4. Tono seco cerrado. Closed slap. (Tapao, galleta, quemao).
5. Tono seco presionado. Pressed slap.
6. Tono bajo de palma. Bass tone.
7. Tono de talón de mano. Heel tone.
8. Toque de dedos. Fingers tone.
9. Toque de punta de dedos. Fingertips tone.
10. Tono de uñas. Fingernails tone.
11. Tono deslizado. Glissando tone.

==== Basic strokes ====
There are four basic strokes in conga drumming:

- Open tone (tono abierto): played with the four fingers near the rim of the head, producing a clear resonant sound with a higher pitch than muffled and bass tones.
- Muffled, muted, closed of flesh tone (tono ahogado or apagado) or simply "muff": like the open tone, it is made by striking the drum with the four fingers, but holding the fingers against the head to muffle the tone. It can also be played with a cupped hand or the heel of the hand.
- Bass tone (tono bajo): played with the full palm, in a slightly cupped position, somewhat off center on the head. It produces a low muted sound.
- Slap tone (tono seco or tapado): the most difficult technique, producing a loud clear "popping" sound. The muted or pressed slap tone (toque tapado normal) involves playing an open tone while the other hand rests on the drumhead, which produces a higher pitch. There are open (tono tapado abierto) and half-open (tono tapado semi-abierto) variants, in which the playing hand briefly rests on the edge of the drumhead after the stroke, followed by another stroke with the other hand. When played at fast and short intervals, this is called floreo, which is often used to instill emotion in the dancers.

Other strokes can be used to enhance the timbral palette of the instrument. They are not used by all drummers, but have become the hallmark of congeros such as Tata Güines.

- Touch or toe tone (toque de punta): as implied by the name, this tone is produced by just touching the fingers or heel of the palm to the drum head. It is possible to alternate a touch of the palm with a touch of the fingers in a maneuver called heel-toe (manoteo), which can be used to produce the conga equivalent of drumrolls.
- Nails stroke (toque de uñas): played with the tip of the nails, usually finger by finger in quick succession, starting with the pinky.

==== Glissando and pitch bending ====
The deslizado, moose call or glissando is done by rubbing the third finger, supported by the thumb, across the head of the drum. The finger is sometimes moistened with saliva or sweat, and sometimes a little coat of beeswax is put on the surface of the conga head to help make the sound. The moose call is also done on the bongos.

To bend the pitch of the congas, a conguero sometimes uses his elbow to shift around on and apply pressure to different parts of the head; this causes the note to change. This is not a traditional stroke, but it is common in modern salsa and rumba.

== Rhythms ==
=== Guaguancó ===
Guaguancó uses three congas. The smallest conga is the lead drum known as quinto. The following nine-measure quinto excerpt is from the guaguancó "La polémica" by Los Muñequitos de Matanzas (1988). This passage moves between the main modes of playing (A, B, C). The A section is the basic lock or ride, as it is known in North America. It spans one clave (measure). An alternate phrase (B) is also one measure in length. Cross-beats, the basis of the third section (C), contradict the meter. By alternating between the lock and the cross, the quinto creates larger rhythmic phrases that expand and contract over several clave cycles. Los Muñequintos quintero Jesús Alfonso (1949–2009) described this phenomenon as a man getting "drunk at a party, going outside for a while, and then coming back inside."

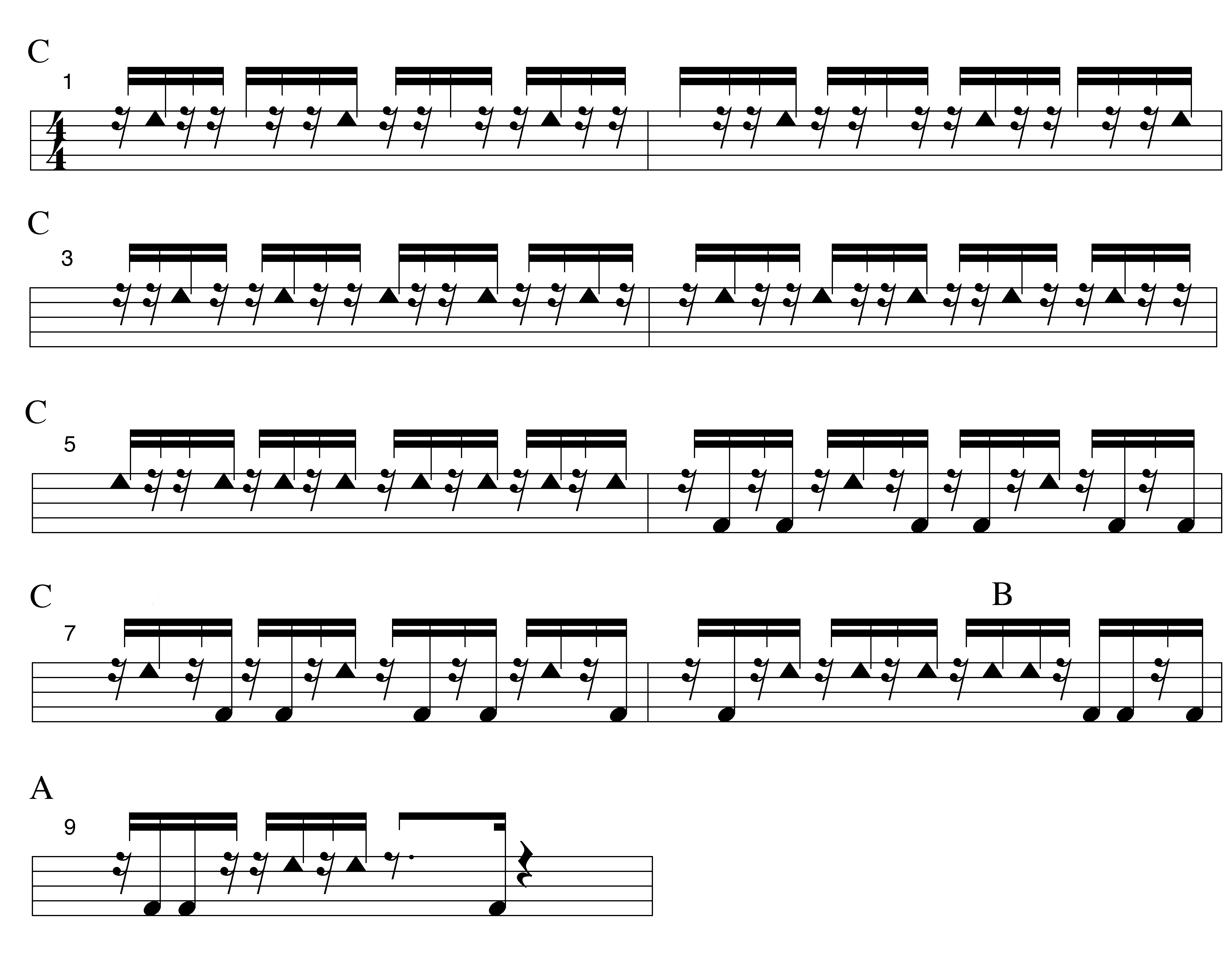
All modes of quinto in context. Quinto excerpt from "La polémica" by Los Muñequitos de Matanzas (1988).

=== Marcha (tumbao) ===
==== Clave-neutral ====
The basic son montuno conga pattern is called marcha, or tumbao. The conga was first used in bands during the late 1930s, and became a staple of mambo bands of the 1940s. The primary strokes are sounded with open tones, on the last offbeats (2&, 2a) of a two-beat cycle. The fundamental accent—2& is referred to by some musicians as ponche.

1 e & a 2 e & a Count
H T S T H T O O Conga
L L R L L L R R Hand Used

Key:
  L: Left hand
  R: Right hand
  H: Heel of hand
  T: Tip of hand
  S: Slap
  O: Open Tone

==== Clave-aligned ====
The basic tumbao sounds slaps (triangle noteheads) and open tones (regular noteheads) on the "and" offbeats. There are many variations on the basic tumbao. For example, a very common variant sounds a single open tone with the third stroke of clave (ponche), and two tones preceding the three-side of clave. The specific alignment between clave and this tumbao is critical.

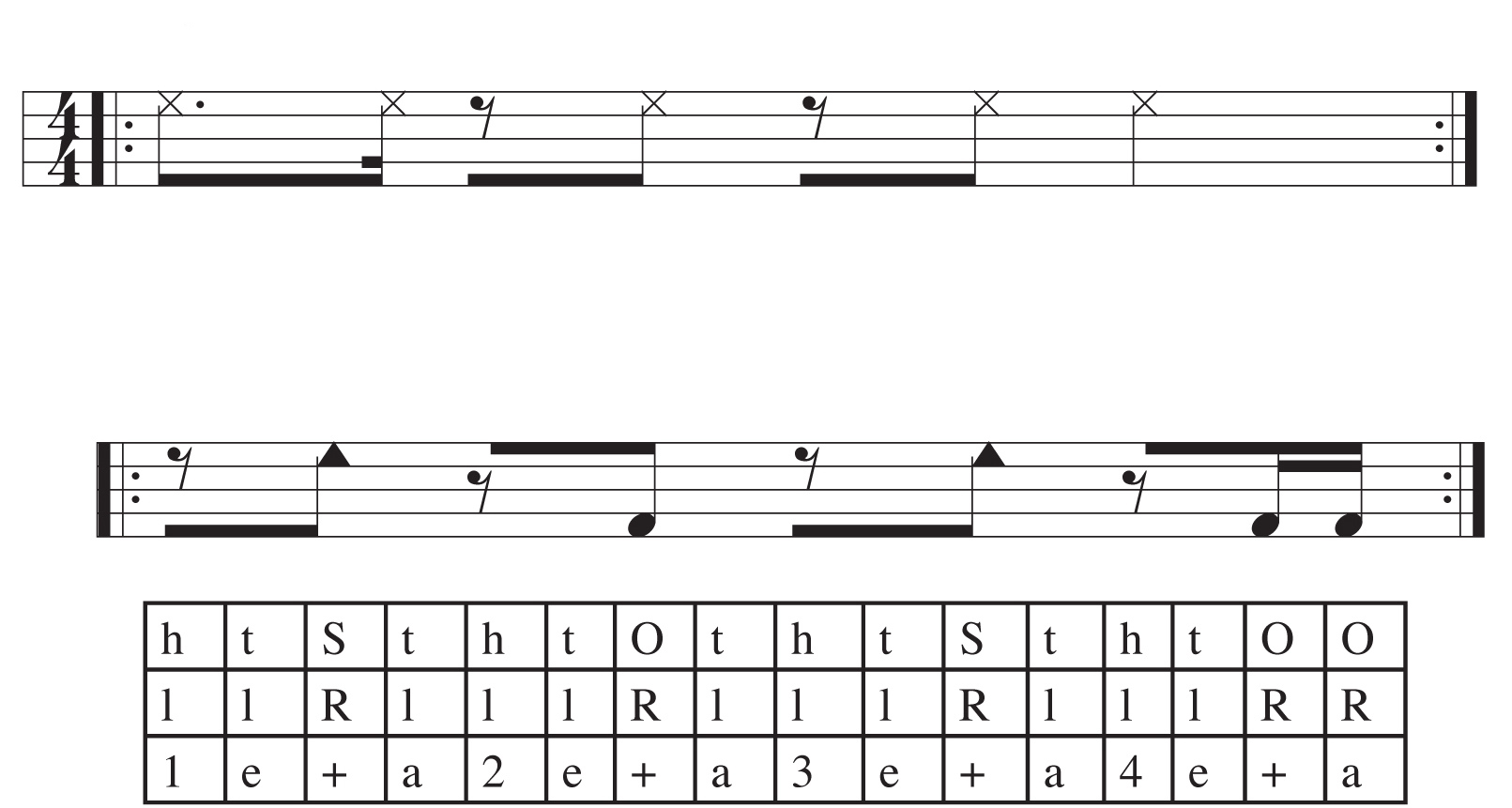
Top: clave. Bottom: basic conga tumbao on one drum. S: slap, O: open tone, h: palm heel, t: finger tips.

Another common variant uses two drums and sounds bombo (1a) on the tumba (3-side of the clave). For example:

1 . & . 2 . & . 3 . & . 4 . & . Count
X     X     X       X   X       Son Clave
X     X       X     X   X       Rumba Clave 
H T S     T O O H T S T H T O O Conga
      O O                       Tumba
L L R R R L R R L L R L L L R R Hand Used

or

1 . & . 2 . & . 3 . & . 4 . & . Count
X     X     X       X   X       Son Clave
X     X       X     X   X       Rumba Clave 
H T S   H T O O H T S   H T O O Conga
      O               0         Tumba
L L R R L L R R L L R R L L R R Hand Used

=== Bolero ===
There is also the bolero rhythm that is used for ballads. The conga part is similar to the marcha.

=== Songo ===
Beginning in the late 1960s, band conga players began incorporating elements from folkloric rhythms, especially rumba. Changuito and Raúl "el Yulo" Cárdenas of Los Van Van pioneered this approach of the songo era.

This relationship between the drums is derived from the style known as rumba. The feeling of the high drum part is like the quinto in rumba, constantly punctuating, coloring, and accenting, but not soloing until the appropriate moment (Santos 1985).

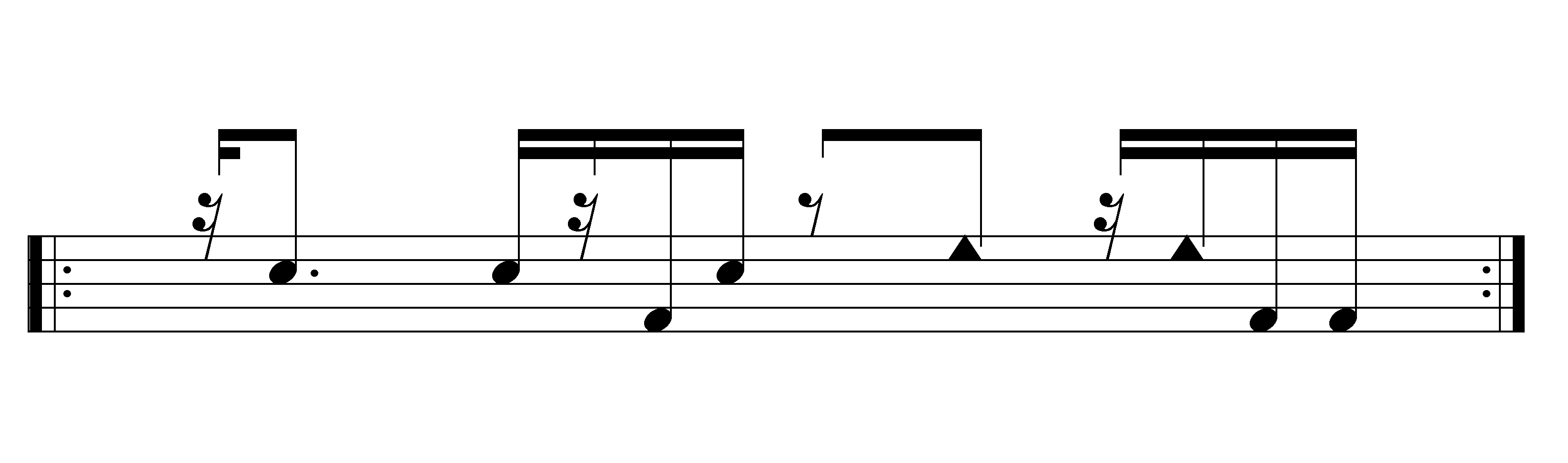
Basic form of songo tumbadoras part. Triangle notehead: high-pitched drum slap; regular noteheads: high and low drum open tones.

In several songo arrangements, the tumbadora ('conga') part sounds the typical tumbao on the low-pitched drum, while replicating the quinto (lead drum) of guaguancó on the high-pitched drum. The quinto-like phrases can continually change, but they are based upon a specific counter-clave motif. [See: "Songo Patterns on Congas" (Changuito).

=== Timba ===
Tomás Cruz developed several adaptations of folkloric rhythms when working in Paulito FG's timba band of the 1990s. Cruz's creations offered clever counterpoints to the bass and chorus. Many of his marchas span two or even four claves in duration, something very rarely done previously. He also made more use of muted tones in his tumbaos, all the while advancing the development of . The example on the right is one of Cruz's inventos ('musical inventions'), a band adaptation of the Congolese-based Afro-Cuban folkloric rhythm makuta. He played the pattern on three congas on the Paulito song "Llamada anónima." Listen: "Llamada Anónima" by Paulito F.G.

=== Other genres ===
The conga repertoire includes many other rhythms found in genres such as danzón, mambo and cha-cha-cha, as well as foreign styles that have adopted Afro-Cuban percussion such as Jamaican reggae, Brazilian samba and bossa nova, and American soul, funk, Latin jazz and Latin rock. In the 1960s, the conga became a prominent instrument in Haitian popular music styles such as konpa, yeye and mini-djaz.

Conjuntos and orchestras playing Colombian dance music have incorporated cumbia rhythms, traditionally played on tambores known as alegre and llamador, to the conga drums. The standard Colombian cumbia rhythm is simple and played slowly; it goes 1-2-2-1, also heard as 1-2-1-2. In the Dominican Republic, the fast merengue rhythm, which goes 1 2–1–2, can be played on the conga. It can also be heard as 1-2-1-2 1-2-1-2-1-2. Essentially, it is the rhythm of the tambora applied to conga. In merengue típico (or cibaeño), the rhythm is usually more complex and less standardized; it can range from simply hitting the conga on a fourth beat to playing full patterns that mark the time.

== See also ==
- Bongo
- List of conga players
- Ngoma drums
- Timbales
- Tumbao

== General bibliography ==
- Cruz, Tomás, with Kevin Moore (2004). The Tomás Cruz Conga Method v. 3. Pacific, MO: Mel Bay.
- Dworsky, Alan; Betty Sansby (1995). Conga Drumming: A Beginner's Guide to Playing with Time. Dancing Hands. ISBN 0-9638801-0-1.
- Mauleón, Rebeca (1993). Salsa Guidebook for Piano and Ensemble. Petaluma, California: Sher Music. ISBN 0-9614701-9-4.
- Peñalosa, David (2011). Rumba Quinto. Redway, CA: Bembe Books. ISBN 1-4537-1313-1
- Sanchez, Poncho; Chuck Silverman (2002). Poncho Sanchez' Conga Cookbook. Cherry Lane Music. ISBN 1-57560-363-2.
