= Tumbao =

Pattern used in Cuban music

In music of Afro-Cuban origin, tumbao is the basic rhythm played on the bass. In North America, the basic conga drum pattern used in popular music is also called tumbao. In the contemporary form of Cuban popular dance music known as timba, piano guajeos are known as tumbaos.

== Bass pattern ==
=== Clave-neutral ===
The tresillo pattern is the rhythmic basis of the ostinato bass tumbao in Cuban son-based musics, such as son montuno, mambo, salsa, and Latin jazz.

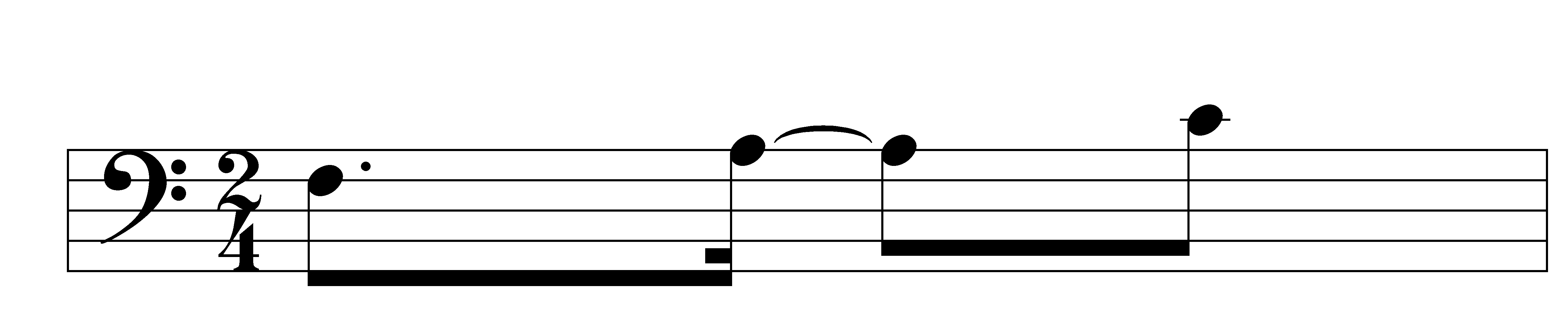
Tresillo-based tumbao from "Alza los pies Congo", by Septeto Habanero (1925).

Often the last note of the measure is held over the downbeat of the next measure. In this way, only the two offbeats of tresillo are sounded. The first offbeat is known as bombo, and the second offbeat (last note) is sometimes referred to as ponche. The following example is written in cut-time (2/2).

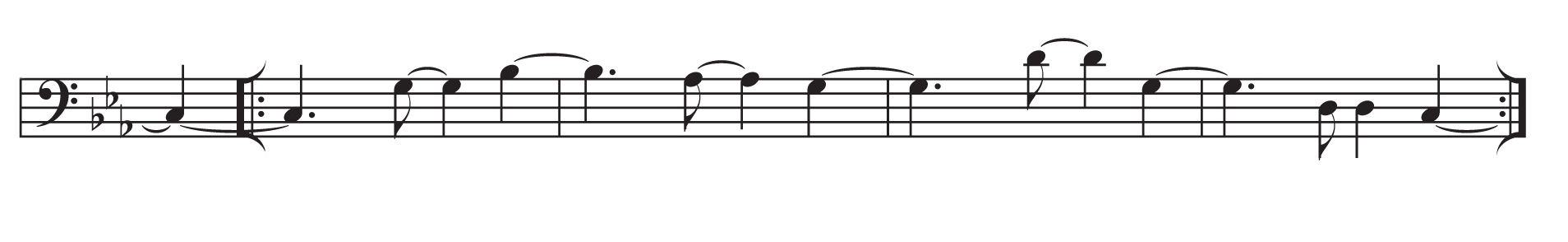
Bombo-ponche tumbao.

=== Clave-aligned ===
Arsenio Rodríguez's group introduced bass tumbaos that have a specific alignment with clave. The 2-3 bass line of "Dame un cachito pa' huele" (1946) coincides with three of the clave's five strokes. David García identifies the accents of "and-of-two" (in cut-time) on the three-side, and the "and-of-four" (in cut-time) on the two-side of the clave, as crucial contributions of Rodríguez's music. The two offbeats are present in the following 2-3 bass line from Rodríguez's "Mi chinita me botó" (1944).

The two offbeats are especially important because they coincide with the two syncopated steps in the son's basic footwork. The conjunto's collective and consistent accentuation of these two important offbeats gave the son montuno texture its unique groove and, hence, played a significant part in the dancer's feeling the music and dancing to it, as Bebo Valdés noted "in contratiempo" ['offbeat timing']—García (2006: 43).

Moore points out that Rodríguez's conjunto introduced the two-celled bass tumbaos, that moved beyond the simpler, single-cell tresillo structure. This type of bass line has a specific alignment to clave, and contributes melodically to the composition. Rodríguez's brother Raúl Travieso recounted, Rodríguez insisted that his bass players make the bass "sing." Moore states: "This idea of a bass tumbao with a melodic identity unique to a specific arrangement was critical not only to timba, but also to Motown, rock, funk, and other important genres."

=== Timba ===
Timba tumbaos incorporate techniques from funk, such as slapping, and pulling the strings in a percussive way. The following excerpt demonstrates several characteristics of timba bass. This is Alain Pérez's tumbao from a performance of Issac Delgado piece "La vida sin esperanza". Pérez's playful interpretation of the tumbao is what timba authority Kevin Moore refers to as “controlled improvisation;" the pattern continuously varies within a set framework.

== Conga drum pattern ==
=== Clave-neutral ===
The basic son montuno tumbao pattern is played on the conga drum. The conga was first used in bands during the late 1930s, and became a staple of mambo bands of the 1940s. The primary strokes are sounded with open tones, on the last offbeats (2&, 2a) of a two-beat cycle. The fundamental accent—2& is referred to by some musicians as ponche.

1 e & a 2 e & a Count
H T S T H T O O Conga
L L R L L L R R Hand Used

Key:
  L: Left hand
  R: Right hand
  H: Heel of hand
  T: Tip of hand
  S: Slap
  O: Open Tone

=== Clave-aligned ===
The basic tumbao sounds slaps (triangle noteheads) and open tones (regular noteheads) on the "and" offbeats. There are many variations on the basic tumbao. For example, a very common variant sounds a single open tone with the third stroke of clave (ponche), and two tones preceding the three-side of clave. The specific alignment between clave and this tumbao is critical.

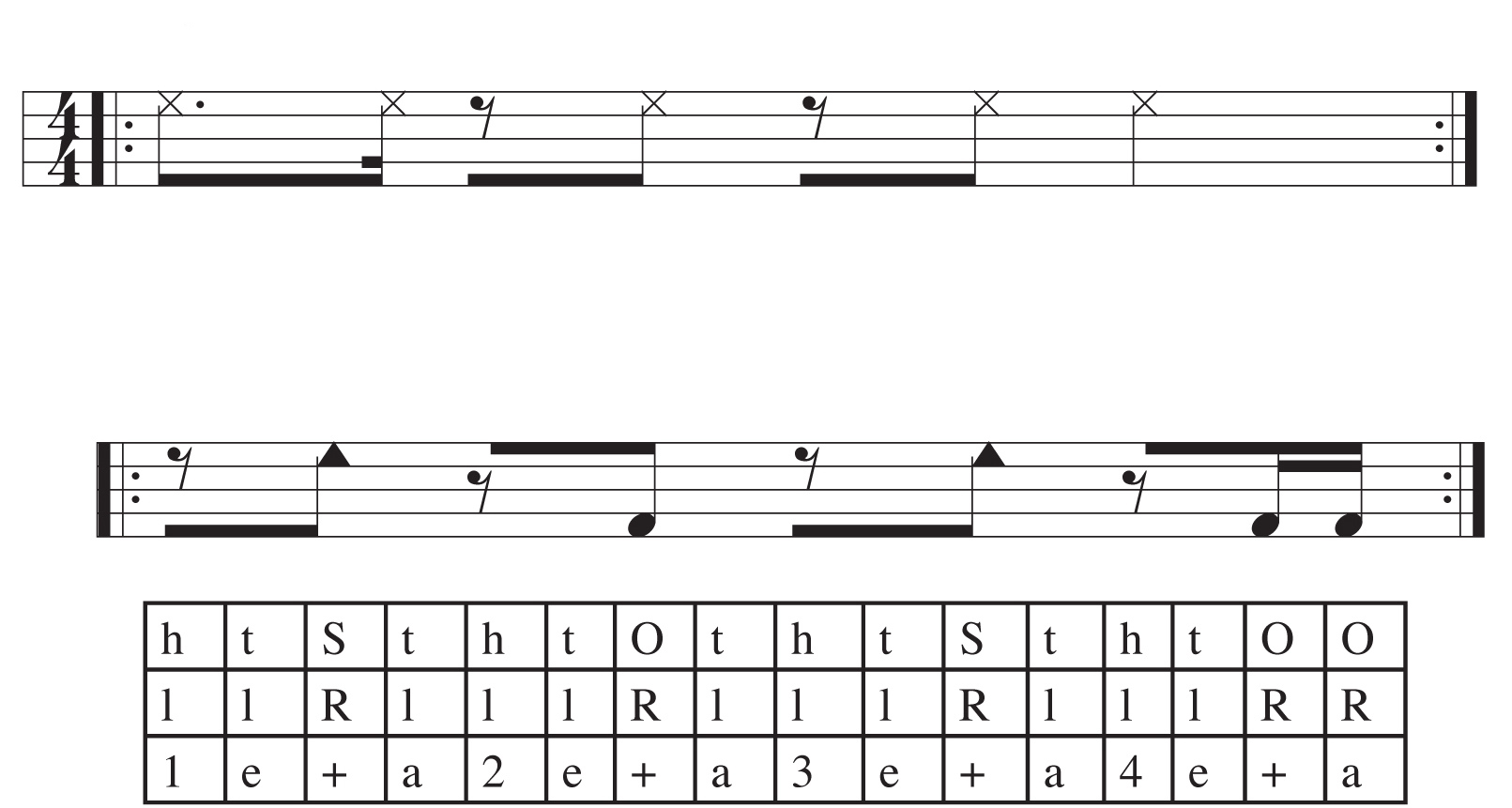
Top: clave. Bottom: basic conga tumbao on one drum. S: slap, O: open tone, h: palm heel, t: finger tips.

Another common variant uses two drums and sounds bombo (1a) on the tumba (3-side of the clave). For example:

1 . & . 2 . & . 3 . & . 4 . & . Count
X     X     X       X   X       Son Clave
X     X       X     X   X       Rumba Clave 
H T S     T O O H T S T H T O O Conga
      O O                       Tumba
L L R R R L R R L L R L L L R R Hand Used

or

1 . & . 2 . & . 3 . & . 4 . & . Count
X     X     X       X   X       Son Clave
X     X       X     X   X       Rumba Clave 
H T S   H T O O H T S   H T O O Conga
      O               0         Tumba
L L R R L L R R L L R R L L R R Hand Used

=== Songo era ===
Beginning in the late 1960s, band conga players began incorporating elements from folkloric rhythms, especially rumba. Changuito and Raúl "el Yulo" Cárdenas of Los Van Van pioneered this approach of the songo era.

This relationship between the drums is derived from the style known as rumba. The feeling of the high drum part is like the quinto in rumba, constantly punctuating, coloring, and accenting, but not soloing until the appropriate moment (Santos 1985).

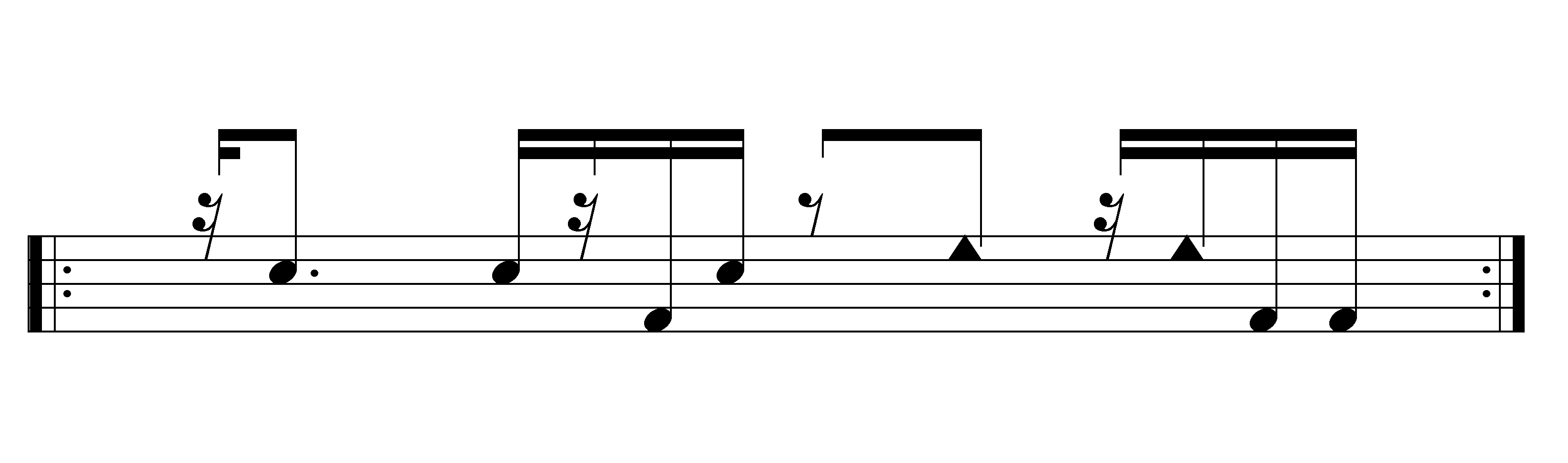
Basic form of songo tumbadoras part. Triangle notehead: high-pitched drum slap; regular noteheads: high and low drum open tones.

In several songo arrangements, the tumbadora ('conga') part sounds the typical tumbao on the low-pitched drum, while replicating the quinto (lead drum) of guaguancó on the high-pitched drum. The quinto-like phrases can continually change, but they are based upon a specific counter-clave motif.

=== Timba era ===
Tomás Cruz developed several adaptions of folkloric rhythms when working in Paulito FG's timba band of the 1990s. Cruz's creations offered clever counterpoints to the bass and chorus. Many of his tumbaos span two or even four claves in duration, something very rarely done previously. He also made more use of muted tones in his tumbaos, all the while advancing the development of . The example on the right is one of Cruz's inventos ('musical inventions'), a band adaptation of the Congolese-based Afro-Cuban folkloric rhythm makuta. He played the pattern on three congas on the Paulito song "Llamada anónima".

== Timba keyboard guajeos ==
The Cuban jazz pianist Gonzalo Rubalcaba developed a technique of pattern and harmonic displacement in the 1980s, which was adopted into timba tumbaos (timba piano guajeos) in the 1990s. Many timba bands use two keyboards, such as Issac Delgado's group, which features's Melón Lewis (1st keyboard) and Pepe Rivero (2nd keyboard).
