= Paulito FG =

Cuban singer (1962–2025)

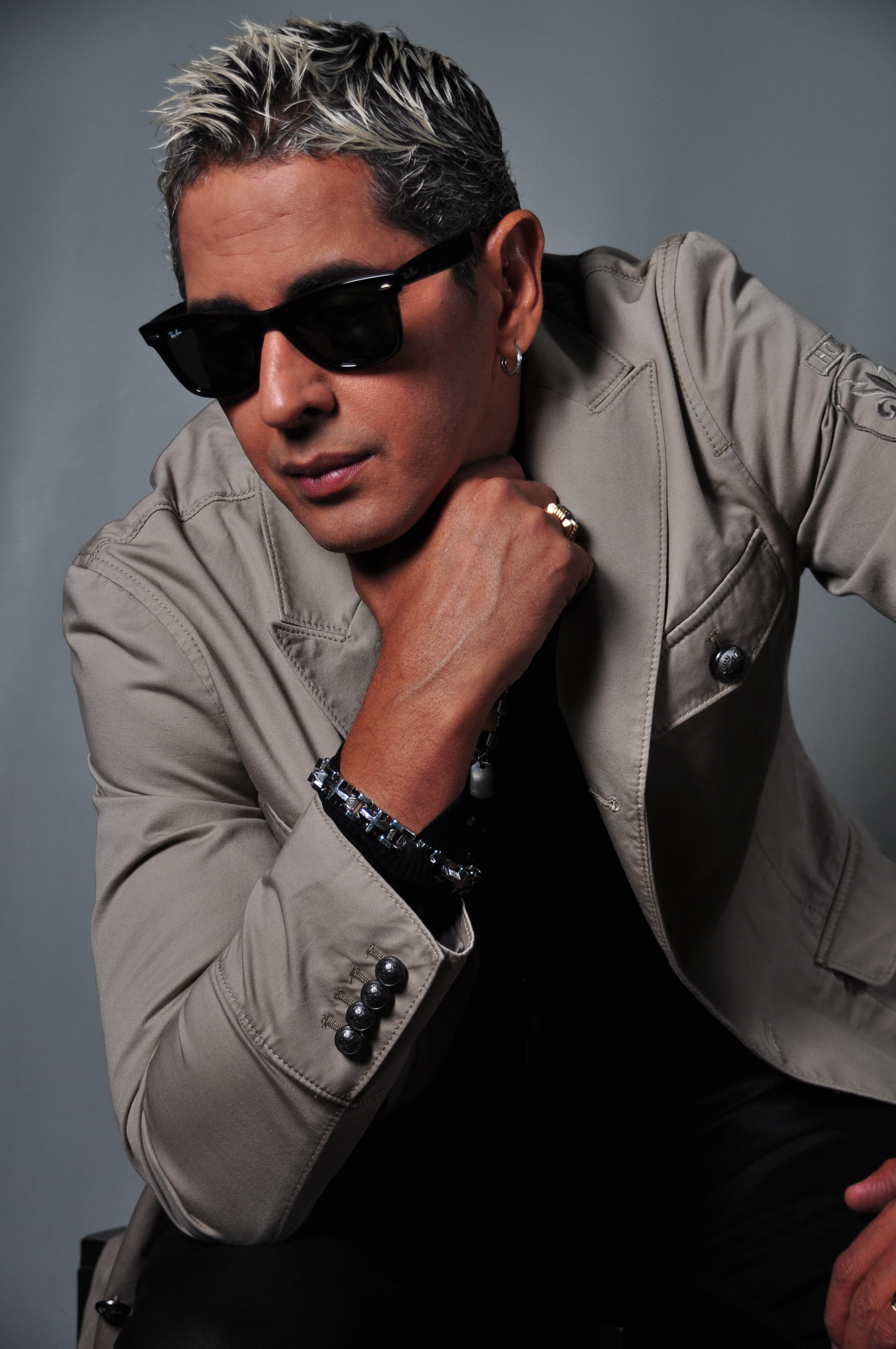
Image of Paulo

Paulito FG (born Paulo Alfonso Fernández Gallo; 11 January 1962 – 1 March 2025), also known as Paulo FG or Pablo FG, was a Cuban singer who was one of the original innovators of timba and was a popular salsa and timba performer.

== Career ==
Paulito began his professional career singing with Adalberto Álvarez and Dan Den. He then joined the band Opus 13, led by the arrangers Joaquín Betancourt and Juan Manuel Ceruto. Paulito took over leadership of Opus 13 in the early 1990s, and changed the name of the group.

In 1995 Paulito released Sofocándote, one of the most innovative recordings of the new dance genre timba. This was the first CD featuring his drummer Yoel Páez, one of Cuba's best. Paulito (El bueno soy yo) was released in 1996. It features Sergio Noroña (piano), Yosvel Bernal (synthesizer keyboard), Joel Domínguez (bass), Tomás Cruz (congas), and Yoel Páez (drums).

In 1997 he released Con la conciencia tranquila, considered by many to be his masterpiece (Moore 2011: web) The piano guajeos were individually constructed for each song. Joel Domínguez's bass-playing was both rhythmically aggressive and significantly melodic. Domínguez's bass lines were one of the major elements after the vocal choruses, giving the music its distinctive contrapuntal character. Creatively incorporating elements from different folkloric sources, the conga tumbaos of Tomás Cruz interlocks with the timbales/drumset hybrid parts created by Yoel Páez. The horn-playing and Ceruto's charts were also remarkable.

Una vez más...por amor (2001) was a continuation of Paulito's most creative period. The album marked the end of his collaboration with Juan Ceruto, with half of the songs arranged by Ceruto and the other half after his departure. Personnel included Mauricio Herrera (drums), Jorge "El Toro" Castillo (congas), Cristóbal Verdecia (bass), and Rolando Luna (piano).

== Musical significance ==
Paulito FG was one of the most innovative Cuban timba artists. He spontaneously moves his rhythm section through various arrangement changes, created on the spot with specialized hand signals. All the while, he constantly dances, interacts with the crowd, and reinterprets his own lyrics. Paulito's bands broke new ground with a number of innovations. Some of the most significant contributions came from his conga drummer Tomás Cruz. Cruz's creations offered clever counterpoints to the bass and chorus. Many of his tumbaos span two or even four claves in duration, something very rarely done previously. He also made more use of muted tones in his tumbaos, all the while advancing the development of songo-type innovations created by Changuito and Raúl "el Yulo" Cárdenas of Los Van Van. The example on the right is one of Cruz's inventos ('musical inventions'), a band adaptation of the Congolese-based Afro-Cuban folkloric rhythm makuta. He played the pattern on three congas for the Paulito song "Llamada anónima."

== Cultural significance ==
Like other timberos, Paulito takes the contemporary speech of the street and places it into the refrains of his estribillos (choruses). Paulito considers the estribillo to be a synthesis of his overall message, and "the secret lies in the treatment of the estribillo inside the literary body of the song” (Vaughan 2010: 752).

Paulito stated that during Cuba's economic crisis of the mid-1990s, known as the Special Period, timba music provided an opportunity “to forget the shortages, the cutoff electricity, the bad transportation, to find refuge” (Vaughan 2012: 10). At the same time, timba, the first internationalized Cuban dance craze in decades, brought much needed tourist dollars into Havana. Over time, timba musicians sought to obtain some of the wealth they were earning for state institutions. They began to dress in a more flashy, hip-hop style, emulating the economic aspirations of many struggling Cubans. This led to the state withdrawing its support, and becoming hostile to the timba movement. Paulito:

There was a time during the special period when we [los timberos] were an important economic help for the Revolution, but later this changed—precisely because of the great demand we had created—this became something that was frowned upon in a society like this one (2003 Paulito interview. Vaughan 2012-10-17).

== Death ==
Gallo died in Havana on 1 March 2025, after the vehicle he was driving was hit by a bus. He was transferred to the Calixto García hospital, where he died shortly after. Gallo was 63.

== Discography ==
- Dance & Romance (Opus 13) (1991).
- Tú no me calculas (1993).
- Sofocándote (1995).
- Paulito" ("El bueno soy yo") (1996).
- Con la conciencia tranquila (1997).
- Una vez más...por amor (2001).
- Te Deseo Suerte (2003).
- Ilusion (2005).
- Un poquito de to' (2005).
- Sin etiqueta (2010).
- Abre que voy (2013).
- Brindando (2019).

== Sources ==
- Cruz, Tomás, with Kevin Moore (2004) The Tomás Cruz Conga Method v. 1, v. 2, v. 3. Pacific, MO: Mel Bay.
- Moore, Kevin (2011) "Paulito FG" Web. Timba.com Paulito FG
- Moore, Kevin (2012) Beyond Salsa for Beginners; The Cuban Timba Revolution. ISBN 1480160938.
- Vaughan, Umi (2012). Rebel Dance, Renegade Stance:Timba Music and Black Identity in Cuba. The University of Michigan Press. Kindle Edition.
