= Makuta (drum) =

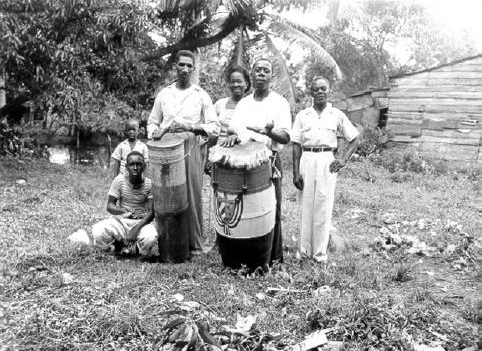
Makuta drummers from Sagua la Grande, Cuba, 1947.

Makuta drums are tall cylindrical or barrel-shaped Afro-Cuban drums, often cited as an important influence on the development of the tumbadora or conga drum. They are used in sacred dance-drumming ceremonies associated with the descendants of slaves brought to Cuba from Central Africa. The word makuta is also used to refer to the dancing and rhythms associated with these drums.

== Construction ==
Makuta drum construction has a number of regional variations, but the ensemble usually consists of only two drums. Generally, all are created from wooden staves, similar to the way a barrel would be constructed. Both sizes have a goat skin head at the top of the drum and are open on the opposite end. They are commonly around 1 meter in height and their heads vary from approximately 30 cm to 40 cm in diameter.

The large lead drum is known variously as caja, nsumbi, or ngoma and is usually barrel shaped. Its head is attached with a tensioning system of metal rods, usually known in English as “lugs.” The smaller drum known as segundo, salidor, or kundiabata, is cylindrical and has the skin attached with tacks, thus requiring it to be tuned by a flame or other heat source. The researcher Fernando Ortiz was told by interviewees that a cord-tensioning system was used prior to metal lugs, and this system was more recently documented in other regions by the Cuban music research institute known as CIDMUC (see references below).

Makuta drums are often adorned with painted symbols of the cabildo to which they belong, or even Cuban national symbols. They are played while standing and are sometimes attached to the player with a rope around the waist in order to lean the drum slightly forward. Both drums are played with the hands and the lead drummer sometimes wears shakers on his wrists, a practice also common in yuka and rumba drumming.

== History ==
Makuta drums are associated with Cuban cabildos that claim Bantu or Congo ancestry (i.e., from Central Africa). There is some uncertainty as to whether or not these drums were historically played in ensembles of three, or if that was a more recent and infrequent addition.

Makuta drumming is practiced mostly in the Western provinces of Cuba including Havana and Matanzas. The oldest surviving drums are said to be found in the provinces of Villa Clara, Cienfuegos, and Sancti Spíritus.

== Social function ==
Though the rhythms used in makuta vary from place to place, makuta is always a dance-drumming event with sacred significance. The functions of its African antecedents, however, are said to be more ceremonial, possibly to accompany the coronation of kings in the Congo. In Cuba, makuta activities are associated with Congo cabildos and have been called “public religious music”, a reference to its openness compared to other Congo religious practices in Cuba such as Palo. In the instances that they are used for funeral ceremonies, they can be accompanied by the kinfuiti drum, a friction drum similar to the Brazilian cuica but larger.

Though historically only practiced in cabildos, after the Cuban revolution a number of Afro-Cuban folkloric groups began to perform makuta for staged performances, recordings, and tourists. Such groups, such as Conjunto Folklórico Nacional de Cuba and Grupo Afrocuba de Matanzas, make use of tumbadoras instead of actual makuta drums.
