= Cándido Fabré =

Cuban musician

Cándido Fabré (born in San Luis, Santiago de Cuba) is a Cuban musician, song writer, and singer famous for his skilled improvisation. He was born on 20 September 1959, in the municipality of San Luis (Santiago de Cuba), into a musical family; his father played the tres, his brother was a singer and many bembés (Afro-Cuban festivals where deities are sung for and worshipped) were played with him on the background.

== Songwriting ==
Fabré made himself famous as the songwriter, arranger and main vocalist with "La Original de Manzanillo", which he joined in 1983.

Fabré is known to create a son from any given situation or expression. As a Cuban songwriter, Cándido has written over 1,000 songs which have been performed by artists such as Orquesta Aragón, Los Van Van, Manguare, Issac Delgado, Ritmo Oriental and Los Karachi. On the international scene, his songs have been performed by Celia Cruz, Oscar D'Leon and José Alberto "El Canario".

== Band ==
Fabré formed his band, Cándido Fabré y su Banda, in 1992. His 14-piece band features Cuban charanga musicians. Cándido and his band have toured all over the world and shared the stage with other Latin musicians including Grupo Niche, Cuco Valoy, Wilfrido Vargas, and Oscar D'León.

Cándido Fabré y su Banda has been in demand in Europe for over 4 years and was one of the first ever Cuban bands to perform at major venues. During their three European tours they have played over 80 concerts in Britain, France, the Netherlands, Belgium, Austria, Germany, Portugal, Switzerland, Ireland and Spain.

== Discography ==
- Échale Picante Al Son
- Ya Esta Aquí El Tren De Oriente
- Cubano Soy (2007)
- La Habana quiere guarachar contigo (2000)
- Poquito a Poco (1998)
