= Songo music =

Genre of popular Cuban music

Songo is a genre of popular Cuban music, created by the group Los Van Van in the early 1970s. Songo incorporated rhythmic elements from folkloric rumba into popular dance music, and was a significant departure from the son montuno/mambo-based structure which had dominated popular music in Cuba since the 1940s. Blas Egües was the first drummer in Los Van Van, but it was the band's second drummer, José Luis Quintana "Changuito", who developed songo into the world-wide phenomenon it is today.

Songo is the most famous of the post-Revolution Cuban rhythms, beginning with the mozambique, which drew from the deep well of Afro-Cuban folkloric rhythms (mainly rumba). During the 1970s, many Cuban bands created their own original rhythms: Los Van Van invented songo; Orquesta Ritmo Oriental—nueva onda; Orquesta Tipica Juventud—bata cinco, and Orquesta Revé named their invention—changüí, after the "funky," folkloric proto-son music of the 19th century.

Songo is a precursor of present-day timba.

== Timbales ==
With songo, the timbales were expanded with the addition of a kick bass drum, and sometimes a snare drum and hi-hat. Songo uses a Cuban-style timbale/drum kit hybrid, which can be anything from standard timbales with kick, to a full drum kit augmented with timbales, woodblock, and various cowbells. Songo was the first Cuban popular dance rhythm to blend rumba and North American funk rhythms.

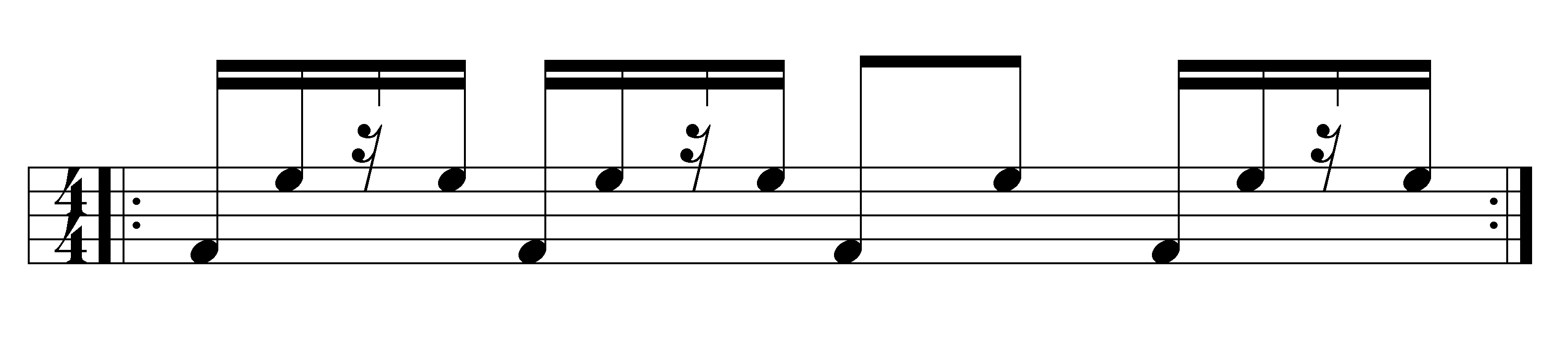
Matanzas-style cáscara.

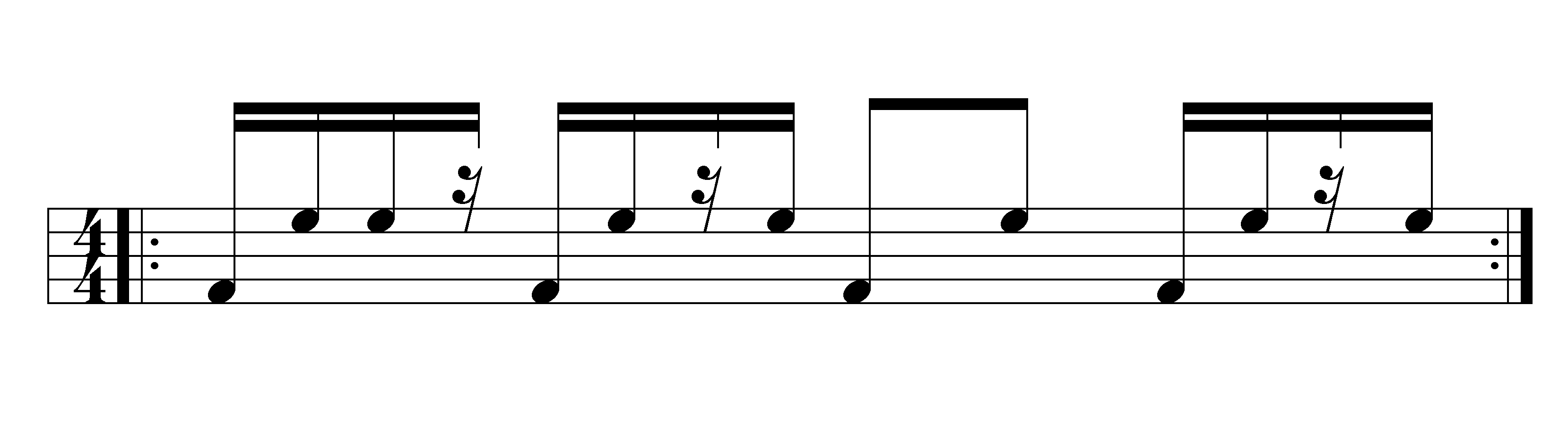
Basic songo stick pattern.

The most basic songo bell pattern is an embellishment of the Matanzas-style cáscara pattern for guaguancó, traditionally played on a guagua (hollowed piece of bamboo). In both patterns the right hand (lower notes) plays the four main beats, while the left hand plays offbeats. The right hand is typically played on a closed hi-hat, woodblock, or cowbell. The left hand is typically played on the snare rim, snare, cowbell(s), or toms. The left hand portion of the pattern is expressed in a wide variety of melodic motifs, and timbres. See: "Songo Patterns on Drum Kit" (Changuito).

== Tumbadoras ==
This relationship between the drums is derived from the rumba style. The feeling of the high drum part is like the quinto in rumba, constantly punctuating, coloring, and accenting, but not soloing until the appropriate moment (Santos 1985).

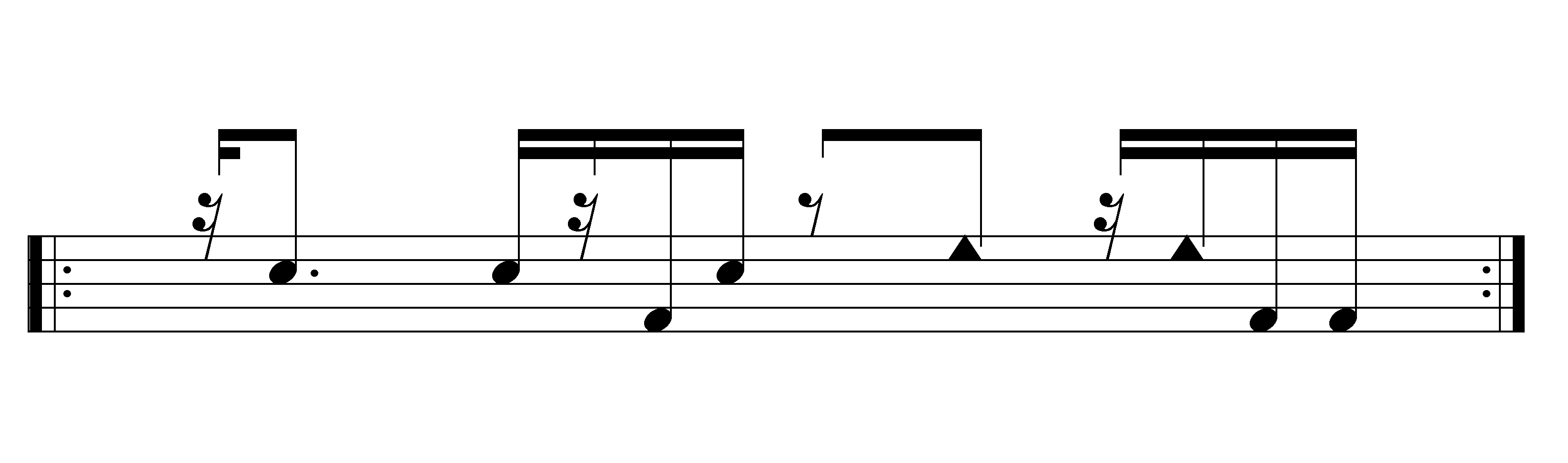
Basic form of songo tumbadoras part. Triangle notehead: high-pitched drum slap; regular noteheads: high and low drum open tones..

In several songo arrangements, the tumbadora ('conga') part sounds the typical tumbao on the low-pitched drum, while replicating the quinto (lead drum) of guaguancó on the high-pitched drum. The quinto-like phrases can continually change, but they are based upon a specific counter-clave motif. [See: "Songo Patterns on Congas" (Changuito).

== Charanga with a rumba "feel" ==
The rhythmic inventions in songo, share similarities with the contemporaneous inventions by folkloric rumba groups such as Los Muñequitos de Matanzas, and Los Papines from Havana. Not only is songo percussion heavily influenced by rumba, but the syncopated quality of the singing and other melodic elements reflect more rumba influence than heard in earlier genres. The guajeos (ostinato melodies) are often built upon offbeat patterns.

Many Latin musicians have described the songo as a very soulful type of music; for instance Juan Formell (leader of Los Van Van) says that "it is the synthesis of a personality, of a way of being and feeling the music, a sum of cultures and a way of making a musician into someone polyfacetic and original." Cuban drummers often stress that songo is not a particular rhythm, but rather, a particular rhythmic approach. However, these same drummers will usually demonstrate the basic stick part shown above. See: "Basic Songo for Drum Kit" (Ignacio Berroa).

On Los Van Van v. 6 (1980) Juan Formell took the unusual step of adding trombones to his charanga format. Orquesta Revé did the same during the time. "Tú tranquilo" has four interlocking guajeos: two keyboards, violins, and trombones.

== North American usage ==
As used in North America, the term songo refers generally to the rumba-influenced music of Cuban bands during the 1970s, and the conga and timbales parts shown above. These bands were, for the most part, charanga-based (flute, string instruments, and rhythm section), although some bands added trombones. The main exception was the horn-based supergroup Irakere, which blended jazz elements into the rhythmic mix. The horn-based Puerto Rican bands Batacumbele and Zaperoko also refer to their style of music as songo. [See "En vivo" (Batacumbele, featuring Giovanni Hidalgo). Jazz, funk, son and rumba all intersect in songo.

=== Funkifying the clave ===
Songo represented a major breakthrough in Latin music by introducing the drumset into the standard percussion triumvirate of congas, timbales and bongos ... the songo rhythm finally put the drumset on equal footing with the other instruments” (Goines and Ameen 1990).

When played on a drum kit, songo patterns are clave-based rumba-funk hybrids. In the early 1980s, these patterns caught the attention of North American drummers who, as a result, were now able to appreciate the clave-based structure underlying funk. North American drummers in turn adopted songo ideas into various jazz and funk inventions of their own. The fluidly changing patterns of songo offer a more complex palate of rhythmic textures for jazz than the "angular" mambo rhythms typically used in Latin jazz.

== The precursor of timba ==
The funky rhythms of present-day timba evolved from songo. Most timba bands are horn-based rather than charanga-based. It is also very popular in Spanish Christian Pentecostal churches.
