= Dan Den =

Cuban timba band

Dan Den is a cuban music timba group founded by Juan Carlos Alfonso in late 1988. It has toured the world.

== Discography ==
- Siempre hay un ojo que te ve (1990)
- Amame con tu experiencia (1992)
- Más rollo que película (1992)
- Viejo Lázaro (1993) awarded best instrumentalist at the Feria de Cali
- Aprovechando la cobertura (1994)
- Dale al que no te dió (1994)
- Son cubano a lo Dan Den (1995) (EGREM)
- Mi cuerpo (1996) (Fania Records)
- Salsa en ataré (1997)
- Mecánica guapa (1998)
- Grandes éxitos (2000) (EGREM)
- Dale campanas (2002) (EGREM) EGREM Prize revelation of the year 2003 by cubadisco
- Pasión (2004)
