= Son cubano =

Style of dance and music originating in Cuba

- Stylistic origins: Changüí; nengón; kiribá; regina
- Cultural origins: Mid-19th century, rural eastern Cuba
- Derivative forms: Salsa music; songo; timba

Subgenres
- Son montuno, sucu-sucu

Fusion genres
- Danzonete; afro-son; bolero-son; guajira-son; rhumba; Congolese rumba

Regional scenes
- Santiago de Cuba, Guantánamo, Havana

Other topics
- Early Cuban bands

The practice of Cuban Son
- UNESCO Intangible Cultural Heritage
- Country: Cuba
- Reference: 02299
- Region: Latin America and the Caribbean

Inscription history
- Inscription: 2025 (20th session)
- List: Representative

Son cubano (Spanish: [ˌsoŋ kuˈβano]), or simply son, is a genre of music and dance that originated in the highlands of eastern Cuba during the late 19th century. It is a syncretic genre that blends elements of Spanish and African origin. Among its fundamental Hispanic components are the vocal style, lyrical metre and the primacy of the tres, derived from the Spanish guitar. On the other hand, its characteristic clave rhythm, call and response structure and percussion section (bongo, maracas, etc.) are all rooted in traditions of Bantu origin. Salsa and the cha-cha are derived from Son Cubano.

Around 1909 the son reached Havana, where the first recordings were made in 1917. This marked the start of its expansion throughout the island, becoming Cuba's most popular and influential genre. While early groups had between three and five members, during the 1920s the sexteto (sextet) became the genre's primary format. By the 1930s, many bands had incorporated a trumpet, becoming septetos, and in the 1940s a larger type of ensemble featuring congas and piano became the norm: the conjunto. The son became one of the main ingredients in the jam sessions known as descargas that flourished during the 1950s.

The international presence of the son can be traced back to the 1930s when many bands toured Europe and North America, leading to ballroom adaptations of the genre such as the American rhumba. Similarly, radio broadcasts of son became popular in West Africa and the Congos, leading to the development of hybrid genres such as Congolese rumba. In the 1960s, New York's music scene prompted the rapid success of salsa, a combination of son and other Latin American styles primarily recorded by Puerto Ricans. While salsa achieved international popularity during the second half of the 20th century, in Cuba son evolved into other styles such as songo and timba, the latter of which is sometimes known as "Cuban salsa".

== Etymology and cognates ==
In Spanish, the word son, from Latin sonus, denotes a pleasant sound, particularly a musical one. In eastern Cuba, the term began to be used to refer to the music of the highlands towards the late 19th century. To distinguish it from similar genres from other countries (such as son mexicano and son guatemalteco), the term son cubano is most commonly used. In Cuba, various qualifiers are used to distinguish the regional variants of the genre. These include son montuno, son oriental, son santiaguero and son habanero.

Son singers are generally known as soneros, and the verb sonear describes not only their singing but also their vocal improvisation. The adjective soneado refers to songs and styles which incorporate the tempo and syncopation of the son, or even its montunos. Generally, there is an explicit difference between styles that incorporate elements of the son partially or totally, as evidenced by the distinction between bolero soneado and bolero-son. The term sonora refers to conjuntos with smoother trumpet sections such as Sonora Matancera and Sonora Ponceña.

== History ==
=== Origins ===
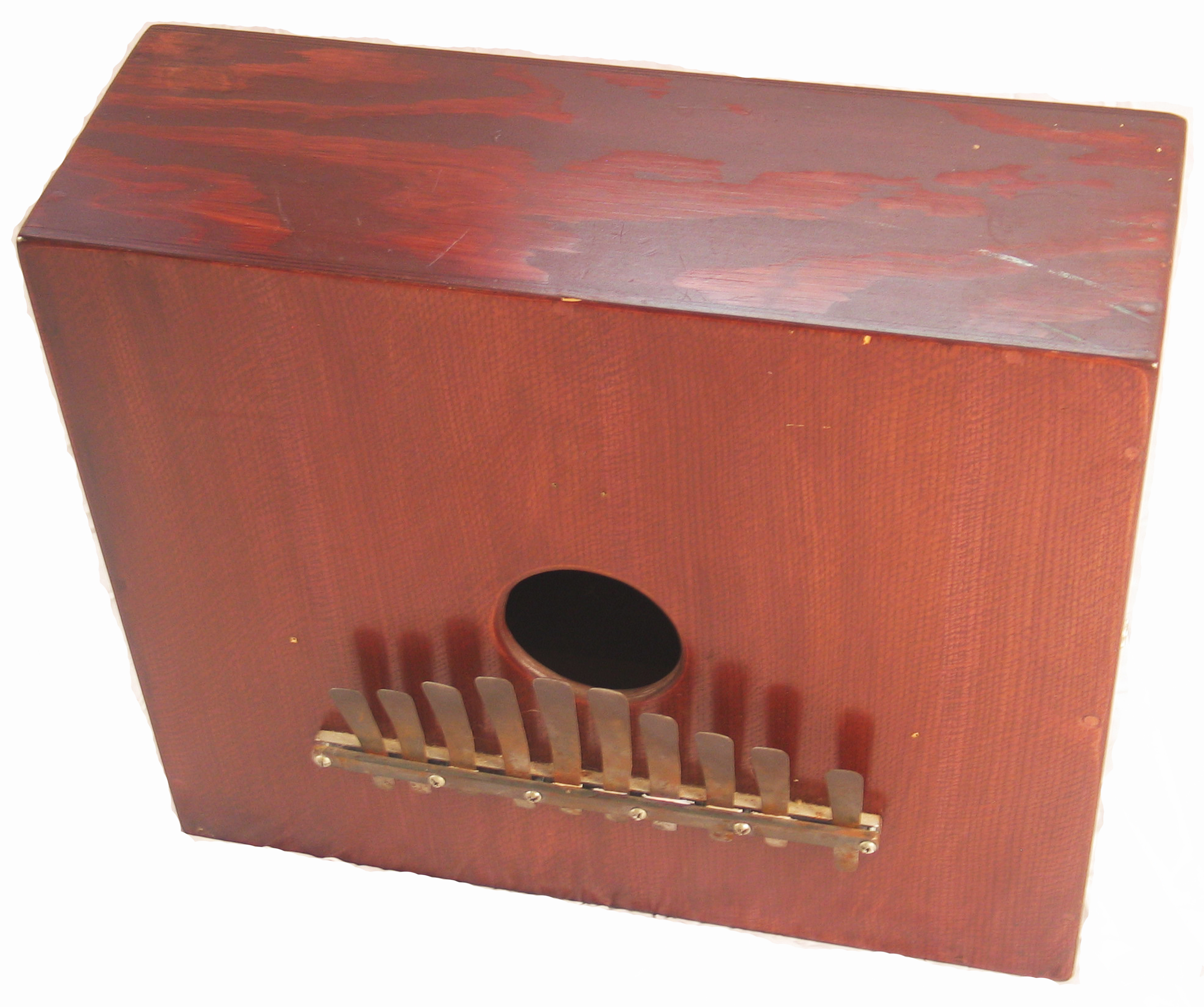
A marímbula, the "bass" instrument used by changüí ensembles. Some groups used the more rudimentary jug known as botija or botijuela.

Although the history of Cuban music dates back to the 16th century, the son is a relatively recent musical invention whose precursors emerged in the mid-to-late 19th century. Historically, most musicologists have supported the hypothesis that the direct ancestors (or earliest forms) of the son appeared in Cuba's Oriente Province, particularly in mountainous regions such as Sierra Maestra. These early styles, which include changüí, nengón, kiribá and regina, were developed by peasants, many of which were of Bantu origin, in contrast to the Afro-Cubans of the western side of the island, which primarily descended from West African slaves (Yoruba, Ewe, etc.). These forms flourished in the context of rural parties such as guateques, where bungas were known to perform; these groups consisted of singers and guitarists playing variants such as the tiple, bandurria and bandola. Such early guitars are thought to have given rise to the tres some time around 1890 in Baracoa. The addition of a rhythm section composed of percussion instruments such as the bongó and the botija/marímbula gave rise to the first son groups proper. Nonetheless, it has become increasingly clear for musicologists that different versions of the son, i.e. styles that fall within the so-called son complex, appeared throughout the rural parts of the island by the end of the 1890s. Musicologist Marta Esquenazi Pérez divides the son complex into three regional variants: changüí in Guantánamo, sucu-sucu in Isla de la Juventud, and an array of styles which fall under the denomination of son montuno and were developed in places such as Bayamo, Manzanillo, Majagua and Pinar del Río. For this reason, some academics such as Radamés Giro and Jesús Gómez Cairo indicate that awareness of the son was widespread in the whole island, including Havana, before the actual expansion of the genre in the 1910s.

Musicologist Peter Manuel proposed an alternative hypothesis according to which a great deal of the son's structure originated from the contradanza in Havana around the second half of the 19th century. The contradanza included many of the traits that are shown in the son, such as duets with melodies in parallel thirds, the presence of a suggested clave rhythm, implicit short vocal refrains borrowed from popular songs, distinctive syncopations, as well as the two-parts song form with an ostinato section.

==== Son de Ma Teodora ====
In 1946, Cuban novelist Alejo Carpentier provided an alternative origin story of the son cubano in his book La música en Cuba. He suggested that a song from eastern Cuba known as "Ma Teodora" could have been an early example of the genre stemming from the 16th century. However, musicological analysis of the song has cast doubt on such assessment, and its origin story, based on an 1893 account by Laureano Fuentes Matons, is generally considered apocryphal. This has been confirmed by musicologists and historians including Manuel Pérez Beato, José Juan Arrom, Carlos Borbolla, Alberto Muguercia and Abelardo Estrada. Odilio Urfé's analysis of "Ma Teodora" concluded that it was unlikely to have originated before the 1800s and according to Miguel Matamoros and others, the song was never part of the repertoire of the earliest son groups — it was a song that mothers used to sing at home in the 1890s. According to Cristóbal Díaz Ayala's history of Cuban music, Carpentier's story was a significant source of confusion for many years due to the popularity of his book.

=== Early 20th century ===
The emergence of son significantly increased the interaction of cultures derived from Africa and Spain. A large number of former black slaves, recently liberated after the abolition of slavery in 1886 went to live in the slums "solares" of low class neighborhoods in Havana, and numerous laborers also arrived from all over the country and some rural areas, looking to improve their living conditions. Many of them brought their Afro-Cuban rumba traditions, and others brought their rumbitas and montunos.

It was in Havana where the encounter of the rumba rural and the rumba urbana that had been developing separately during the second half of the 19th century took place. The guaracheros and rumberos who used to play with the tiple and the guiro finally met other rumberos who sang and danced accompanied by the wooden box (cajón) and the Cuban clave, and the result was the fusion of both styles in a new genre called son. Around 1910 the son most likely adopted the clave rhythm from the Havana-based rumba, which had been developed in the late 19th century in Havana and Matanzas.

After trovador Sindo Garay settled in Havana in 1906, many other trovadores followed him hoping to obtain a recording contract with one of the American Companies such as RCA Victor and Columbia Records. Those trovadores from different parts of the country met others who already lived in Havana such as María Teresa Vera and Rafael Zequeira. They brought their repertoires of canciones (Cuban songs) and boleros that also included rumbas, guarachas and rural rumbitas.

Famous trovador Chico Ibáñez said that he composed his first "montuno" called "Pobre Evaristo" (Poor Evaristo) in 1906: "It was a tonada with three or four words that you put on, and after it, we placed a repeated phrase, the real montuno to be sung by everybody…". Ned Sublette states about another famous trovador and sonero: "As a child, Miguel Matamoros played danzones and sones on his harmonica to entertain the workers at a local cigar factory. He said: 'the sones that were composed at that time were nothing more than two or three words that were repeated all night long.'"

A partial list of trovadores that recorded rumbas, guarachas and sones in Havana at the beginning of the 20th century included: Sindo Garay, Manuel Corona, María Teresa Vera, Alberto Villalón, José Castillo, Juan Cruz, Juan de la Cruz, Nano León, Román Martínez, as well as the duos of Floro and Zorrilla, Pablito and Luna, Zalazar and Oriche, and also Adolfo Colombo, who was not a trovador but a soloist at Teatro Alhambra.

In the Havana neighborhoods, the son groups played in any possible format they could gather and most of them were semi-professional. One of those groups, The Apaches, was invited in 1916 to a party held by President Mario Menocal at the exclusive Vedado Tennis Club, and that same year some members of the group were reorganized in a quartet named Cuarteto Oriental. Those members were: Ricardo Martínez from Santiago de Cuba (conductor and tres), Gerardo Martínez (first voice and clave), Guillermo Castillo (botijuela), and Felipe Neri Cabrera (maracas). According to Jesús Blanco, quoted by Díaz Ayala, after a few months from its foundation the bongocero Joaquín Velazco joined the group.

In 1917, the Cuarteto Oriental recorded the first son documented on the catalog of Columbia Records which was entered as "Pare motorista-son santiaguero". Unexpectedly, a fifth member of the quartet is mentioned, Carlos Godínez, who was a soldier in the standing army (Ejército Permanente). Subsequently, the RCA Victor contracted Godínez in 1918 to organize a group and record several songs. For that recording, the new group was called "Sexteto Habanero Godínez", which included: Carlos Godínez (conductor and tresero), María Teresa Vera (first voice and clave), Manuel Corona (second voice and guitar), Sinsonte (third voice and maracas), Alfredo Boloña (bongo), and another unknown performer who was not included in the list.

=== 1920s ===
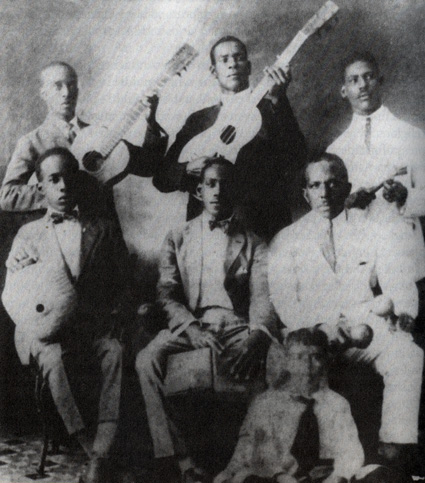
Sexteto Habanero 1920.

In 1920, the Cuarteto Oriental became a sextet and was renamed as Sexteto Habanero. This group established the "classical" configuration of the son sextet composed of guitar, tres, bongos, claves, maracas and double bass. The sextet members were: Guillermo Castillo (conductor, guitar and second voice), Gerardo Martínez (first voice), Felipe Neri Cabrera (maracas and backing vocals), Ricardo Martínez (tres), Joaquín Velazco (bongos), and Antonio Bacallao (botija). Abelardo Barroso, one of the most famous soneros, joined the group in 1925.

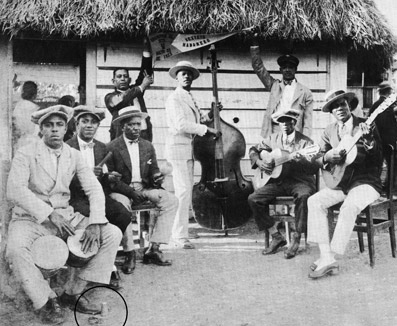
Sexteto Habanero 1925.

Popularization began in earnest with the arrival of radio broadcasting in 1922, which came at the same time as Havana's reputation as an attraction for Americans evading Prohibition laws. The city became a haven for the Mafia, gambling and prostitution in Cuba, and also became a second home for trendy and influential bands from New York City. The son experienced a period of transformation from 1925 to 1928, when it evolved from a marginal genre of music to perhaps the most popular type of music in Cuba.

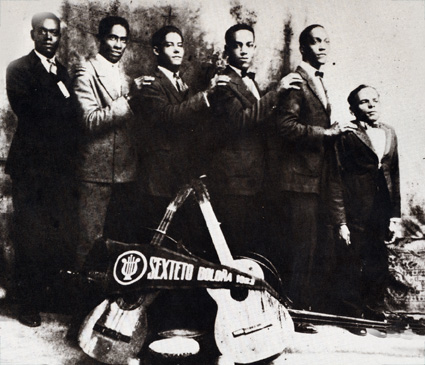
Sexteto Boloña 1926.

A turning point that made this transformation possible occurred when then-president Machado publicly asked La Sonora Matancera to perform at his birthday party. In addition, the acceptance of son as a popular music genre in other countries contributed to more acceptance of son in mainstream Cuba. At that time many sextets were founded such as Boloña, Agabama, Botón de Rosa and the famous Sexteto Occidente conducted by María Teresa Vera.

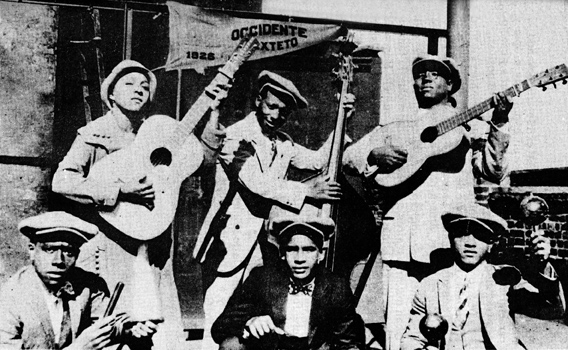
Sexteto Occidente, New York 1926 back: María Teresa Vera (guitar), Ignacio Piñeiro (double bass), Julio Torres Biart (tres); front: Miguelito Garcia (clave), Manuel Reinoso (bongo) and Francisco Sánchez (maracas)

A few years later, in the late 1920s, son sextets became septets and son's popularity continued to grow with artists like Septeto Nacional and its leader Ignacio Piñeiro ("Echale salsita", "Donde estabas anoche"). In 1928, Rita Montaner's "El Manicero" became the first Cuban song to be a major hit in Paris and elsewhere in Europe. In 1930, Don Azpiazu's Havana Casino Orchestra took the song to the United States, where it also became a big hit.

The instrumentation was expanded to include cornets or trumpets, forming the sextets and the septets of the 1920s. Later these conjuntos added piano, other percussion instruments, more trumpets, and even dance orchestra instruments in the style of jazz big bands.

=== Trío Matamoros ===
The presence of the Trío Matamoros in the history of Cuban son is so important that it deserves a separate section. Its development constitutes an example of the process that the trovadores usually followed until they became soneros. The Trío was founded by Miguel Matamoros (vocals and first guitar), who was born in Santiago de Cuba (Oriente) in 1894. There, he became involved with the traditional trova movement and in 1925 joined Siro Rodríguez (vocals and maracas) and Rafael Cueto (vocals and second guitar) to create the famous group.

They synthesized the style of the sextets and septets, adapting it to their ensemble. The different rhythmic layers of the son style were distributed between their three voices, guitars and maracas. Cueto plucked the strings of his guitar instead of strumming them as it was usual, providing the patterns of the guajeo in the treble range, and the syncopated rhythms of the tumbao on the bass strings. The counterpoint was completed by the first guitar, played by Matamoros. They also occasionally included other instruments such as the bongo, and later they decided to expand the trio format to create a son conjunto by adding a piano, more guitars, tres and other voices. This project was joined by such important figures as Lorenzo Hierrezuelo, Francisco Repilado (Compay Segundo) and Beny Moré.

In 1928, they travelled to New York with a recording contract by RCA Victor, and their first album caused such a great impact in the public that they soon became very famous at a national as well as an international level. The Trío Matamoros maintained great prominence until their official retirement in 1960.

=== 1930s ===
By the late 1930s, the heyday of "Classic son" had largely ended. The sextetos and septetos that had enjoyed wide commercial popularity increasingly lost ground to jazz bands and amplified conjuntos. The very music that son had helped to create was now replacing son as the more popular and most requested music in Cuba. Original son conjuntos were faced with the options of either to disband and refocus on newer styles of Cuban music, or go back to their roots.

=== 1940s ===
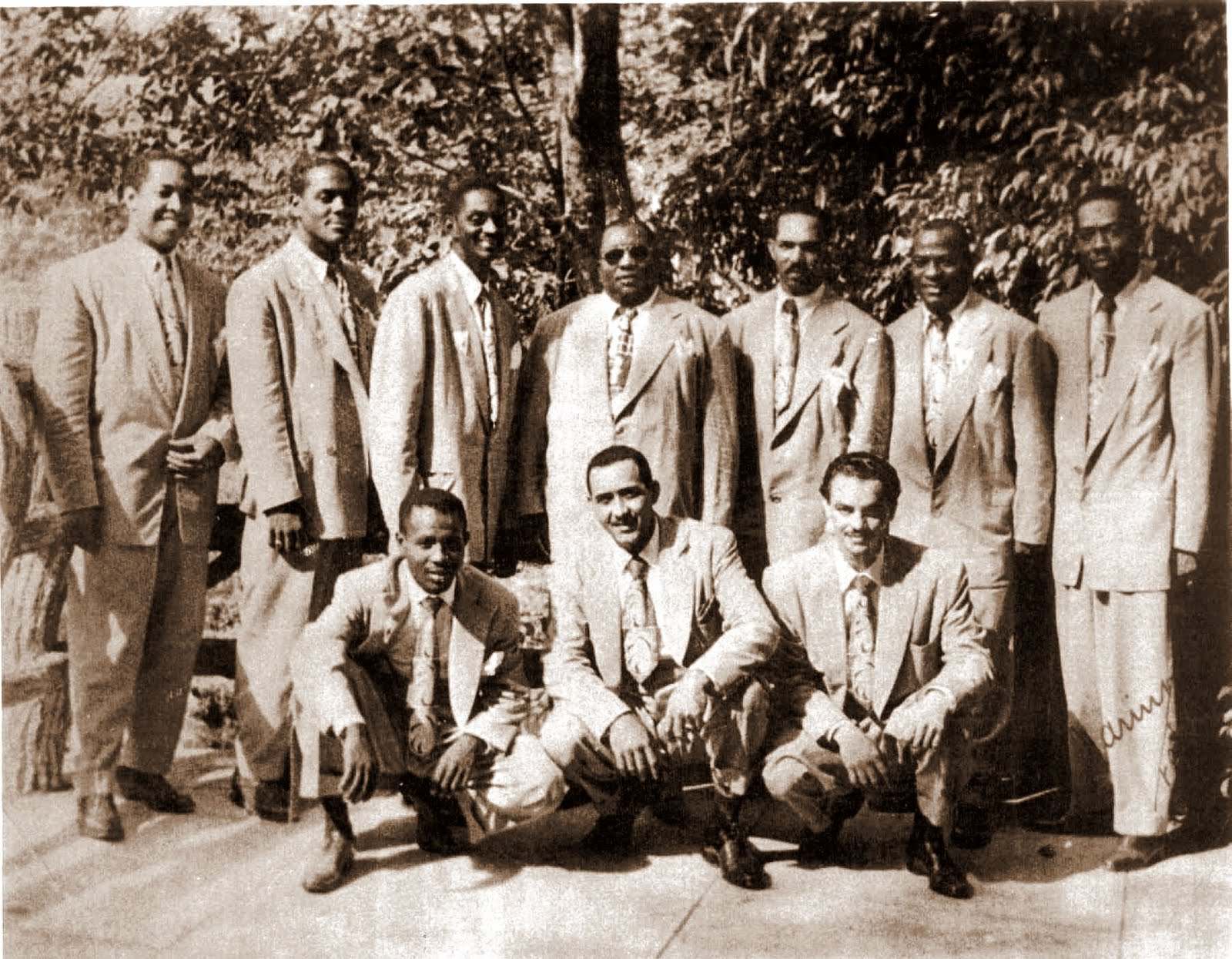
Conjunto de Arsenio Rodríguez ca. 1949.

In the 1940s, Arsenio Rodríguez became the most influential player of son. He used improvised solos, toques, congas, extra trumpets, percussion and pianos, although all these elements had been used previously ("Papauba", "Para bailar son montuno"). Beny Moré (known as El Bárbaro del Ritmo, "The Master of Rhythm") further evolved the genre, adding guaracha, bolero and mambo influences. He was perhaps the greatest sonero ("Castellano que bueno baila usted", "Vertiente Camaguey"); another important sonero was Roberto Faz.

By the late 1940s, son had lost its controversiality even among conservative Cubans which made it even less appealing to Cubans. A development that led to the decrease in popularity of the original son occurred in the 1940s. The son grew more sophisticated as it was adopted by conjuntos, which displaced sextetos and septetos. This led to big bands replacing the conjuntos, which managed to keep its flavor despite elaborate arrangements.

During the 1940s and 1950s, the tourism boom in Cuba and the popularity of jazz and American music in general fostered the development of big bands and combos on the island. These bands consisted of a relatively small horn section, piano, double bass, a full array of Cuban percussion instruments and a vocalist fronting the ensemble. Their polished sound and "cosmopolitan" – read "commercial" – repertoire captivated both Cuban and foreign audiences.

The commercialism of this new music movement led Cuban nightclub owners to recognize the revenue potential of hosting these types of bands to attract the growing flow of tourists. Additionally, as a result of the increasing popularity of big band music and in an effort to increase revenues, the recording industry focused on producing newer types of music and essentially removing son from their music repertoires. These developments were a big blow to the prospects of son and its popularity amongst even Cubans.

With the arrival of cha-cha-chá and mambo in the United States, son also became extremely popular. After the Cuban Revolution separated Cuba from the U.S., son, mambo and rumba, along with other forms of Afro-Cuban music contributed to the development of salsa music, initially in New York.

The mass popularization of son music led to an increased valorization of Afro-Cuban street culture and of the artists who created it. It also opened the door for other music genres with Afro-Cuban roots to become popular in Cuba and throughout the world.

=== Current state of the son ===
At present, the traditional-style son is seldom heard but has been assimilated into other genres and is present in them. Thus, other types of popular Cuban music and other Latin styles of music continue using the essential style of the son.

Another important contribution of the son was the introduction of the drum to mainstream music. The increase in popularity of the son unveiled the potential of music with Afro-Cuban rhythms. This led to the development and mass distribution of newer types of Latin music. Additionally, genres of the later 1940s such as mambo manifest many characteristics derived from son. Charanga orchestras, also developed dance music heavily influenced by son.

Perhaps the most significant contribution of son is its influence on present day Latin music. Son is specifically considered to be the foundation on which salsa was created.

Although the "classic son" continues to be a very important musical foundation for all kinds of Latin music, it is no longer a popular music genre in Cuba. Younger generations of Cubans prefer the faster, dance-oriented son-derivatives such as timba or salsa. Older generations continue to preserve the son as one of the music genres they listen to, specifically in Oriente, where they tend to maintain more traditional versions of the son compared to Havana.

The demise of the USSR (Cuba's major economic mainstay) in 1991 forced Cuba to encourage tourism to attract sorely needed foreign currency. Along with tourism, music became one of Cuba's major assets. The Buena Vista Social Club album and film as well as a stream of CDs triggered a worldwide Cuban music boom. In addition to the original Buena Vista Social Club album, there has been a stream of solo CDs by the members of the "Club". These individuals were subsequently offered individual contracts, ensuring a continued flow of CDs that include many original Cuban son classics.

The release of the Buena Vista Social Club album and film led to a revival of the traditional son cubano and renewed interest in older performers. While some critics note that the project primarily represents historical styles rather than contemporary Cuban music, the album introduced son cubano to a global audience and popularized the genre among younger generations internationally.

== Instrumentation ==
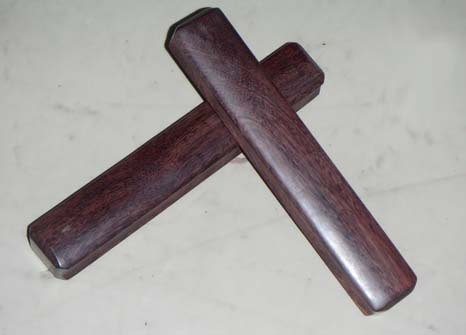
Claves

The basic son ensemble of early 20th-century Havana consisted of guitar, tres, claves, bongos, marímbula or botija, and maracas. The tres plays the typical Cuban ostinato figure known as guajeo. The rhythmic pattern of the following generic guajeo is used in many different songs. Note that the first measure consists of all offbeats. The figure can begin in the first measure, or the second measure, depending upon the structure of the song.

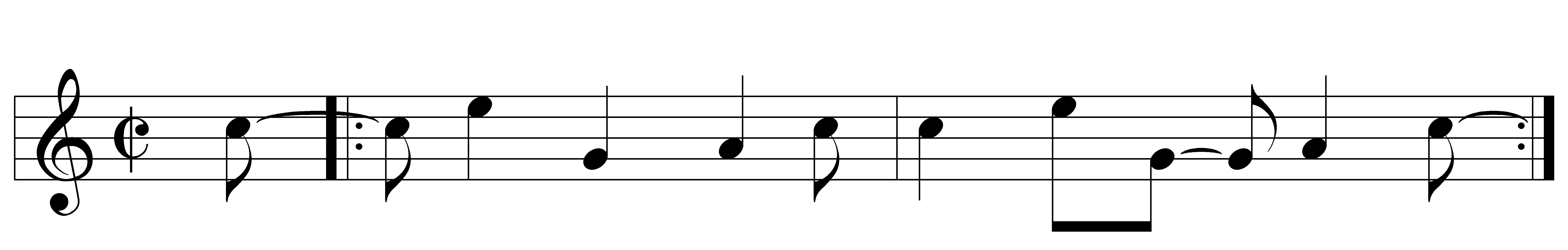
Basic son tres guajeo written in cut-time.

Later on, the double bass replaced the marímbula and bongos and a trumpet were added, giving rise to sextetos and septetos.

== See also ==
- Music of Cuba
- Dance in Cuba

== Bibliography ==
- Argeliers, Leon. "Notes toward a Panorama of Popular and Folk Music." Essays on Cuban Music: North American and Cuban Perspectives. Ed. Peter Manuel. Maryland: University Press of America, 1991. 1–23. Print.
- Benitez-Rojo, Antonio. "Music and Nation." Cuba: Idea of a Nation Displaced. Ed. Andrea O’Reilly Herrera. New York: State University of New York Press, 2007. 328–340. Print.
- Leymarie, Isabelle. Cuban Fire: The Story of Salsa and Latin Jazz. New York, Continuum Publishing, 2002. Print.
- Loza, Steven. "Poncho Sanchez, Latin Jazz, and the Cuban Son: A Stylistic and Social Analysis." Situating Salsa. Ed. Lise Waxer. New York: Routledge, 2002. 201–215. Print.
- Manuel, Peter, with Kenneth Bilby and Michael Largey. Caribbean Currents: Caribbean Music from Rumba to Reggae. 2nd edition. Temple University Press, 2006. ISBN 1-59213-463-7.
- Moore, Robin. "Salsa and Socialism: Dance Music in Cuba, 1959–99." Situating Salsa. Ed. Lise Waxer. New York: Routledge, 2002. 51–74. Print.
- Moore, Robin. "Afrocubanismo and Son." The Cuba Reader: History, Culture, Politics. Ed. Chomsky, Carr, and Smorkaloff. Durham: Duke University Press, 2004. 192–200. Print.
- Peñalosa, David. The Clave Matrix; Afro-Cuban Rhythm: Its Principles and African Origins. Redway, CA: Bembe Inc., 2009. ISBN 1-886502-80-3.
- Perna, Vincenzo. Timba: The Sound of the Cuban Crisis. Burlington, VT: Ashgate Publishing Company, 2005. Print.
- Rodríguez Ruidíaz, Armando: The origin of Cuban music. Myths and facts: https://www.academia.edu/8041795/The_origin_of_Cuban_music._Myths_and_Facts, p. 89
- Thomas, Susan. "Cosmopolitan, International, Transnational: Locating Cuban Music." Cuba Transnational. Ed. Damian J. Fernandez. Gainesville: University Press of Florida, 2005. 104–120. Print.
