= Juan Formell =

Cuban bassist, composer and arranger (1942–2014)

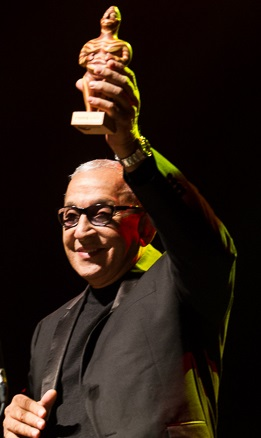
- Juan Formell in 2013.

Background information
- Born: Juan Clímaco Formell Cortina; August 2, 1942; Havana, Cuba
- Died: May 1, 2014 (aged 71) Havana, Cuba
- Genre: Salsa music
- Occupations: Singer-songwriter, composer, arranger
- Instrument: Bass
- Years active: 1957–2014

Juan Climaco Formell Cortina (2 August 1942 – 1 May 2014) was a Cuban bassist, composer, and arranger, best known as the director of Los Van Van. He was a creator of popular danceable music and credited with bringing electronic instrumentation into the Cuban musical form.

His full name was Juan Clímaco (John Climacus) Formell Cortina.

His professional activity started in 1957 as musician of cabaret orchestras, radio and television. In 1959 he worked as bassist of Musical Band of Revolutionary Police. He died of liver disease at the age of 71 in 2014.

== Awards ==
In 1999, Juan Formell received a Grammy Award (Latin/Best Salsa Performance) for his work on the album "Llegó... Van Van – Van Van Is Here", recorded at Abdala Studios.
