= Changuito =

Cuban percussionist (1948–2025)

José Luis Quintana (January 18, 1948 – June 6, 2025) was a Cuban percussionist.

== Background ==
Changuito was born in Casablanca, Cuba on January 18, 1948. As a child, he played professionally in bands such as Havana Jazz (joining aged 8), with his musician father, and with La Pandilla de los Cabezas de Perros. At the age of 13, he volunteered for military service and played in army bands, serving for three years, during which he also played in the jazz band Estrellas de Occidente. His mother died when he was 17 years old. In 1964, he joined the popular band Los Harmonicos, followed by a year in Sonorama 6, and spells as drummer in Souvinir and La Orchestra de Musica Moderna.

In 1970, he joined Los Van Van. They created the songo, where a combination of percussion instruments (timbales, cowbells, wood blocks, electronic drums, and cymbals) and hand techniques are characteristic.

He first recorded as a solo artist in 1992, and became recognized as a teacher of percussion. In 1996, Changuito was nominated for a Grammy award for his work with Carlos "Patato" Valdes and Orestes Vilato, produced by Greg Landau. This was his first recording in the United States, and it highlighted many aspects of his playing overlooked in his Van Van recordings. He also played on a recording with Greg Landau, accompanying Puerto Rican poet Piri Thomas, along with Patato and Orestes. He also contributed to recordings by Hilario Durán.

Changuito taught other notable percussionists including Giovanni Hidalgo, Karl Perazzo (of Santana), and Ginaski Wop (member of Bardamu project).

Changuito died on June 6, 2025, at the age of 77.

== "Changuito special" ==
While Changuito held the timbales chair in Los Van Van in the 1970s, he popularized the technique of simultaneously playing timbales and bongó bell parts (previously introduced elsewhere by New York City-based drummers/timbaleros like Jimmy 'La Vaca' Santiago with La Playa Sextet and the José Curbelo Orchestra). This was done following the elimination of the bongó player, who would normally play the bongó bell (cencerro) in the montuno (vamp) sections of songs in Cuban-based dance music. The example below shows the combined bell patterns (written in a 2-3 clave sequence).

Two interlocking cowbells, the "Changuito Special"

== Selected discography ==
- [1962] Cal Tjader - Cal Tjader Plays The Contemporary Music Of Mexico And Brasil
- [1994] Flora Purim - Speed of Light
- [1995] Orestes Vilató, Changuito, Patato - Ritmo Y Candela: Rhythm at the Crossroads
- [1997] Juan Formell and Los Van Van - De Cuba
- [1999] Fourth World (Airto Moreira and Flora Purim) - Last Journey
- [2000] Changuito / Cándido Fabré / Tiburon - El Muso Y Su Sonora
- [2000] Maraca - Descarga Total
- [2000] Airto Moreira - Homeless
- [2000] Brice Wassy - Shrine Dance
- [2001] Clave Y Guaguanco with Celeste Mendoza and Changuito - Noche De La Rumba
- [2001] Changuito - Syncopation
- [2002] Kysha25 (from Italy) LP Culebras - in the song Ambatula
- [2002] Maraca - Tremenda Rumba!
- [2002] Giraldo Piloto - Klimax
- [2004] Diego el Cigala and Bebo Valdés - Lagrimas Negras
- [2005] Kysha25 (from Italy) - LP Farandula
- [2007] Changuito - Telegrafias Sin Hilo

== Performances on YouTube ==
- "Changuito La Mano Secreta" on YouTube
- "Changuito - Ritmo Batanga" on YouTube
- "Changuito & Geovani Duets" on YouTube
- "Congas Changuito & Geovani Hidalgo" on YouTube
- "Songo Patterns on Congas - Changuito" on YouTube
- "Songo Patterns on Drums - Changuito" on YouTube
- "Changuito Timbale Solo Virtuoso" on YouTube
- "Changuito Timbale Solo 1" on YouTube
- "Changuito Timbale Solo 2" on YouTube
- "CHANGUITO AND SAMUEL FORMELL" on YouTube
