= Manolito y su Trabuco =

Cuban salsa and timba group

Manolito y su Trabuco is a salsa and timba group out of Camaguey and Havana, Cuba. It is named for founding member, pianist Manolito Simonet. Trabuco literally means a firearm from the times of the Independence War of 1895 and figuratively refers to anything forceful or strong (Vaughan 2012: Kindle 345).

== History ==
On February 26, 1993, after spending at least six years as musical director of Maravilla de Florida, Manolito Simonet departed along with most of the group's members, added a horn section, synthesizer and kick drum, and started playing timba under the name Manolito y su Trabuco.

In 1996 United States based Bembe Records released Manolito's first CD Directo al corazón in North America. This was the first of Bembe's "Salsa cubana" series, an attempt to market the new Cuban popular music as salsa. For the most part however, acceptance of timba in the salsa market has been limited. In 1997, during the height of timba's popularity, the Buena Vista Social Club released its first CD. In response to that record's international success, older-style Cuban music became quite popular. There is little evidence that the BVSC's success affected the sale of timba records though. Because of the band's arrangements, Manolito y su Trabuco is one of the few timba bands that has experienced noteworthy cross-over into the salsa market. Manolito's exceptionally creative use of multiple contrapuntal moñas (horn guajeos) is a rarity in timba, but common in salsa.

Manolito y su Trabuco's front line has included some of the best singers of the era, including Rosendo "El Gallo" Díaz, Sixto "El Indio" Llorente, and Carlos Kalunga. Manolito's 1990s recordings feature one of the most renowned synthesizer players, Osiris Martínez, and the prolific composer, singer Ricardo Amaray. El Trabuco is one of the largest timba bands, a "super-charangón," as it is called, with violin, cello, two trumpets, two trombones, flute, and synthesizer, as well as the standard piano, bass, drums, congas and güiro. Many of Trabuco's biggest hits result from Amaray's R&B influences, filtered through Simonet's strong Cuban aesthetic and arranging abilities. Like Issac Delgado, Manolito made CDs that mixed the aggressive hardcore timba he played in concert with various other styles designed to appeal to foreign buyers. For example, he has recorded cumbias in an effort to target Mexican and South American audiences.

== Discography ==
- (1995) Directo al corazón. (Straight to the heart)
- (1996) Contra todos los prognósticos. (Against all odds)
- Concierto Eurotropical.
- (1998) Marcando La Distancia.
- (2000) Para que baile en Cuba.
- (2001) Se rompieron los termómetros.
- (2004) Locos por mi Habana.
- (2007) Hablando en serio.
- (2008) Control.
- (2010) Trabuco una vez más.
- (2013) Sin freno.
- (2015) No Puedo Parar.
- (2017) Nueva Estrellas de Areito.
- (2018) A Puro Corazón.
- (2018) La Vida Cambió.
- (2020) Clásicos del Trabuco Vol. 1.
- (2023) Trabuco

== Sources ==
- Moore, Kevin (2010). Beyond Salsa Piano; The Cuban Timba Piano Revolution. v. 5 Introduction to Timba. ISBN 978-1-4505-4559-4
- Moore, Kevin (2013). "Manolito y su Trabuco" Timba.com.
- Vaughan, Umi (2012). Rebel Dance, Renegade Stance:Timba Music and Black Identity in Cuba The University of Michigan Press. Kindle Edition.
