= Manolín =

Manolín is a nickname and may refer to:

- Manolín "El Médico de la salsa", Cuban salsa singer
- Manolín Bueno (1940–2026), Spanish footballer
- Manolín (footballer, born 1988), Spanish footballer
- Manolín (footballer, born 1928), Spanish footballer
- Manolín, a character in The Old Man and the Sea
- Manolín (actor) (1918–1977), Mexican actor
