= Salsa music =

Latin American dance music genre

Salsa
- Stylistic origins: Son cubano; son montuno; cha-cha-chá; bolero; rumba; mambo; jazz; R&B; plena; bomba
- Cultural origins: Mainly Cuban, Puerto Rican and Dominican communities in the United States, specifically in New York City

Subgenres
- Salsa romántica; salsa dura

Regional scenes
- Colombia; Costa Rica; Cuba; Dominican Republic; El Salvador; Guatemala; Honduras; Mexico; Nicaragua; Panama; Puerto Rico; United States; Venezuela

Other topics
- Songo music; timba; changüí; mozambique

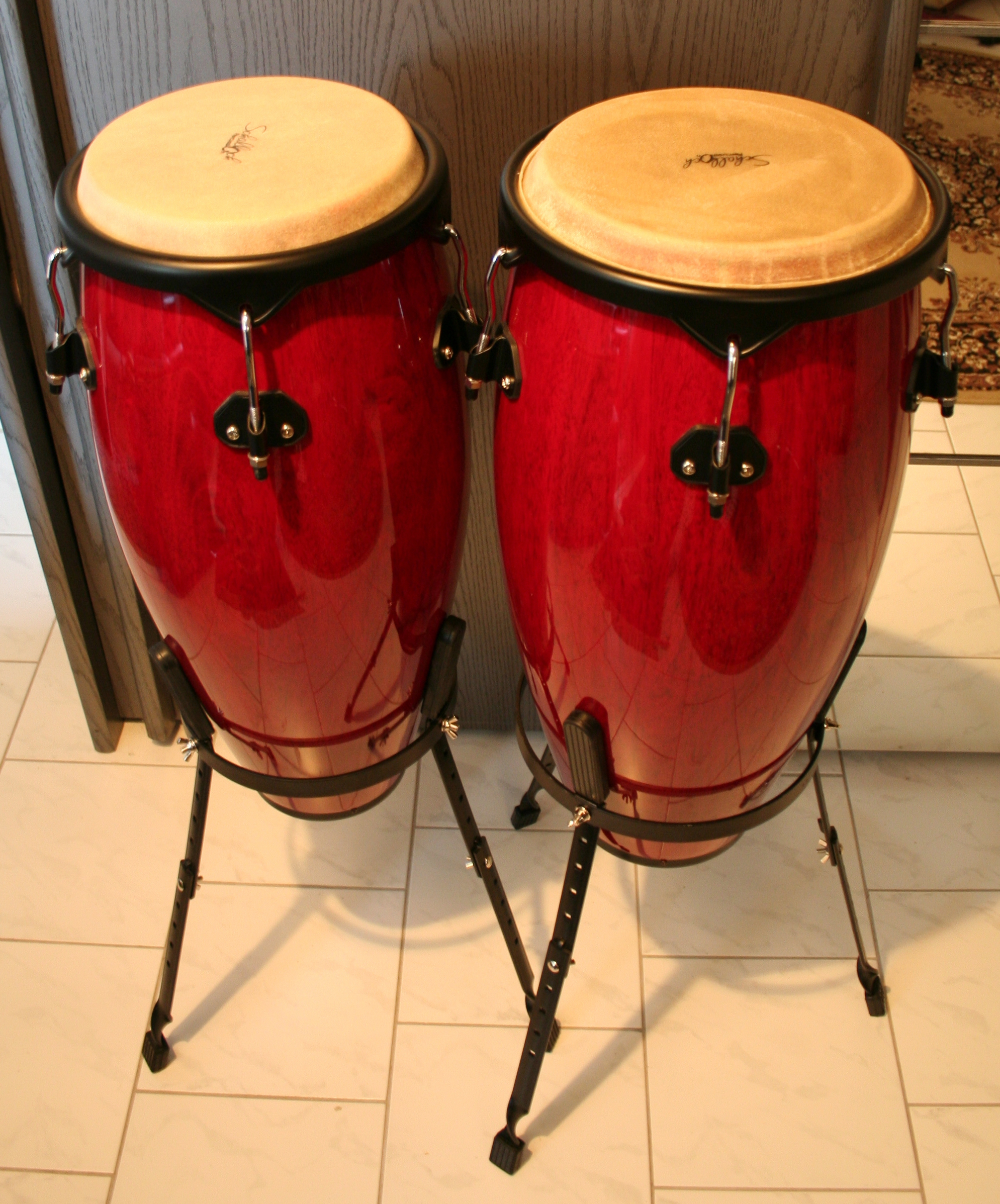
Tumbadoras (conga drums), one of the basic instruments of salsa music

Salsa is a style of dance music mainly influenced by Caribbean traditions and music from Cuba, Puerto Rico, the Dominican Republic, and other countries such as Colombia and Venezuela, where African cultural syncretism in music and dance blends with European influences and indigenous instruments, along with contributions from the contiguous United States. Because most of the basic musical components predate the labeling of salsa, there have been many controversies regarding its origin. Most songs considered as salsa are primarily based on son montuno and son cubano, with elements of cha-cha-chá, bolero, rumba, mambo, jazz, R&B, bomba, plena, merengue (Pambiche) and pachanga as well as other music styles from Latin American countries traditions. All of these genres and their musical instruments are adapted and fused to accomplish smooth and seamless transitions between them when performed within the context of salsa.

Originally the name salsa was used to label commercially several styles of Hispanic Caribbean music, but nowadays it is considered a musical style on its own and one of the staples of Hispanic American culture.

The first self-identified salsa band is Cheo Marquetti y su Conjunto - Los Salseros which was formed in 1955 in Cuba. The first album to mention Salsa on its cover was titled “Salsa” which was released by La Sonora Habanera in 1957. Later on self-identified salsa bands were predominantly assembled by Puerto Rican and Cuban and Dominican musicians in New York City in the 1970s. The music style was based on the late son montuno of Arsenio Rodríguez, Conjunto Chappottín and Roberto Faz. These musicians included Celia Cruz, Willie Colón, Rubén Blades, Johnny Pacheco, Machito and Héctor Lavoe. During the same period a parallel modernization of Cuban son was being developed by Los Van Van, Irakere, NG La Banda under the name of songo, which further evolved into timba in the late 80s with artists like Charanga Habanera; both styles are at present also labelled as salsa. Though limited by an embargo, the continuous cultural exchange between salsa-related musicians inside and outside of Cuba is undeniable.

== Origins of the term Salsa ==
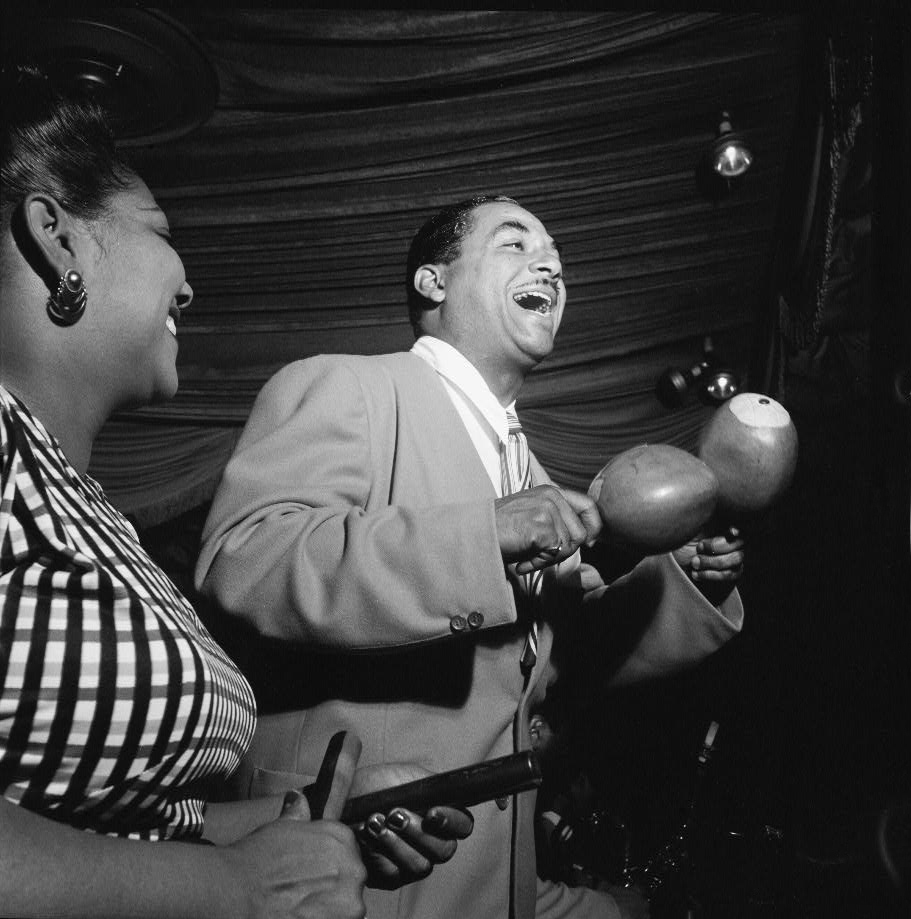
Graciela on claves and her brother Machito on maracas; Machito said that salsa was much like what he had been playing from the 1940s.

The word Salsa means sauce in the Spanish language. The origin of the connection of this word to a style of music is disputed by various music writers and historians.

The musicologist Max Salazar traced the origin of the connection to 1930 when Ignacio Piñeiro composed the song Échale salsita (Put some sauce in it). The phrase is seen as a cry from Piñeiro to his band, telling them to increase the tempo to "put the dancers into high gear". In the mid-1940s, Cuban Cheo Marquetti emigrated to Mexico. He named his group Conjunto Los Salseros, with whom he recorded a couple of albums for the Panart and Egrem labels. Later on, while based in Mexico City, the musician Beny Moré would shout salsa during a performance to acknowledge a musical moment's heat, making a connection with the hot salsa (sauce) made in the country.

Puerto Rican music promoter Izzy Sanabria claims he was the first to use the word salsa to denote a music genre:

In 1973, I hosted the television show Salsa which was the first reference to this particular music as salsa. I was using [the term] salsa, but the music wasn't defined by that. The music was still defined as Latin music. And that was a very, very broad category, because it even includes mariachi music. It includes everything. So salsa defined this particular type of music ... It's a name that everyone could pronounce.

Sanabria's Latin New York magazine was an English language publication. Consequently, his promoted events were covered in The New York Times, as well as Time and Newsweek magazines. Sanabria confessed the term salsa was not developed by musicians: "Musicians were busy creating the music but played no role in promoting the name salsa." For this reason the use of the term salsa has been controversial among musicians. Some have praised its unification element. Celia Cruz said, "Salsa is Cuban music with another name. It's mambo, chachachá, rumba, son ... all the Cuban rhythms under one name." Willie Colón described salsa not as a precise musical style but a power to unite in the broadest terms: "Salsa was the force that united diverse Latino and other non-Latino racial and ethnic groups ...Salsa is the harmonic sum of all Latin culture ".

On the other hand, even some New York based artists were originally against the commercialization of music under that name. Machito said: "There's nothing new about salsa, it is just the same old music that was played in Cuba for over fifty years." Similarly, Tito Puente stated: "The only salsa I know is sold in a bottle called ketchup. I play Cuban music." Cuban musicologist Mayra Martínez wrote that "the term salsa obscured the Cuban base, the music's history or part of its history in Cuba. And salsa was a way to do this so that Jerry Masucci, Fania and other record companies, like CBS, could have a hegemony on the music and keep the Cuban musicians from spreading their music abroad." Izzy Sanabria responded that Martínez was likely giving an accurate Cuban viewpoint, "but salsa was not planned that way". Johnny Pacheco, co-founder of Fania Records, gave his definition of the term “Salsa” during various interviews: “La salsa es, y siempre ha sido, la musica cubana” (“Salsa is, and always has been, Cuban music”).

The marketing potential from the name was so big, that eventually both Machito, Puente, and even musicians in Cuba embraced the term as a financial necessity.

== Instrumentation ==
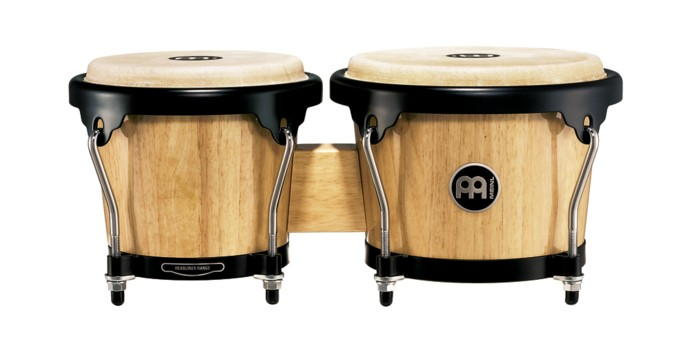
Bongos

The instrumentation in salsa bands is mostly based on the son montuno ensemble developed by Arsenio Rodríguez, who added a horn section, as well as tumbadoras (congas) to the traditional Son cubano ensemble; which typically contained bongos, bass, tres, one trumpet, smaller hand-held percussion instruments (like claves, güiro, or maracas) usually played by the singers, and sometimes a piano. Machito's band was the first to experiment with the timbales. These three drums (bongos, congas and timbales) became the standard percussion instruments in most salsa bands and function in similar ways to a traditional drum ensemble. The timbales play the bell pattern, the congas play the supportive drum part, and the bongos improvise, simulating a lead drum. The improvised variations of the bongos are executed within the context of a repetitive marcha, known as the martillo ('hammer'), and do not constitute a solo. The bongos play primarily during the verses and the piano solos. When the song transitions into the montuno section, the bongo player picks up a large hand held cowbell called the bongo bell. Often the bongocero plays the bell more during a piece, than the actual bongos. The interlocking counterpoint of the timbale bell and bongo bell provides a propelling force during the montuno. The maracas and güiro sound a steady flow of regular pulses (subdivisions) and are ordinarily clave-neutral.

Nonetheless, some bands instead follow the Charanga format, which consists of a string section (of violins, viola, and cello), tumbadoras (congas), timbales, bass, flute, claves and güiro. Bongos are not typically used in charanga bands. Típica 73, Orquesta Broadway, Orquesta Revé and Orquesta Ritmo Oriental where popular Salsa bands with charanga instrumentation. Johnny Pacheco, Charlie Palmieri, Mongo Santamaría and Ray Barretto also experimented with this format.

Latin big bands in the 1950s-1960s included a brass section of trumpets and saxes.

Throughout its 50 years of life, Los Van Van have always experimented with both types of ensembles. The first 15 years the band was a pure charanga, but later a trombone section was added. Nowadays the band could be considered a hybrid.

In the 1960s, Eddie Palmieri decided to replace the violins with two trombones for a heavier sound.

== Rhythm ==
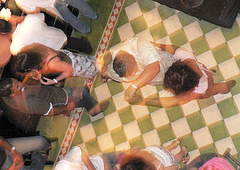
Dancing Salsa in Mexico

Salsa music typically ranges from 160 bpm (beats per minute) and 220 bpm, which is suitable for salsa dancing.

The key instrument that provides the core groove of a salsa song is the clave. It is often played with two wooden sticks (called clave) that are hit together. Every instrument in a salsa band is either playing with the clave (generally: congas, timbales, piano, tres guitar, bongos, claves (instrument), strings) or playing independent of the clave rhythm (generally: bass, maracas, güiro, cowbell). Melodic components of the music and dancers can choose to be in clave or out of clave at any point.

2-3 Son clave

For salsa, there are four types of clave rhythms, the 3-2 and 2-3 Son claves being the most important, and the 3-2 and 2-3 Rumba claves. Most salsa music is played with one of the son claves, though a rumba clave is occasionally used, especially during rumba sections of some songs. As an example of how a clave fits within the 8 beats of a salsa dance, the beats of the 2-3 Son clave are played on the counts of 2, 3, 5, the "and" of 6, and 8.

There are other common rhythms found in salsa music: the chord beat, the tumbao, and the Montuno rhythm.

The chord beat (often played on cowbell) emphasizes the odd-numbered counts of salsa: 1, 3, 5 and 7 while the tumbao rhythm (often played on congas) emphasizes the "off-beats" of the music: 2, 4, 6, and 8. Some dancers like to use the strong sound of the cowbell to stay on the Salsa rhythm. Alternatively, others use the conga rhythm to create a jazzier feel to their dance since strong "off-beats" are a jazz element.

Tumbao is the name of the rhythm that is typically played with the conga drums. Its most basic pattern is played on the beats 2, 3, 4, 6, 7 and 8. Tumbao rhythm is helpful for learning to dance contra-tiempo ("On2"). The beats 2 and 6 are emphasized when dancing On2, and the Tumbao rhythm heavily emphasizes those beats as well.

The Montuno rhythm is a rhythm that is often played with a piano. The Montuno rhythm loops over the 8 counts and is useful for finding the direction of the music. By listening to the same rhythm, that loops back to the beginning after eight counts, one can recognize which count is the first beat of the music.

== Musical structure ==
Most salsa compositions follow the basic son montuno model based on the Afro-Cuban clave rhythm and composed of a verse section, followed by a coro-pregón (call-and-response) chorus section known as the montuno. The verse section can be short, or expanded to feature the lead vocalist and/or carefully crafted melodies with clever rhythmic devices. Once the montuno section begins, it usually continues until the end of the song. The tempo may gradually increase during the montuno in order to build excitement. The montuno section can be divided into various sub-sections sometimes referred to as mambo, diablo, moña, and especial.

== History ==
=== 1930s and 1940s: Origins in Cuba ===
Many musicologists find many of the components of salsa music in the Son Montuno of several artists of the 30s and 40s like Arsenio Rodríguez, Conjunto Chappottín (Arsenio's former band now led by Félix Chappottín and featuring Luis "Lilí" Martínez Griñán) and Roberto Faz. Salsa musician Eddie Palmieri once said "When you talk about our music, you talk about before, or after, Arsenio.....Lilí Martínez was my mentor". Several songs of Arsenio's band, like Fuego en el 23, El Divorcio, Hacheros pa' un palo, Bruca maniguá, No me llores and El reloj de Pastora were later covered by many salsa bands (like Sonora Ponceña and Johnny Pacheco).

On the other hand, a different style, Mambo, was developed by Cachao, Beny Moré and Dámaso Pérez Prado. Moré and Pérez Prado moved to Mexico City where the music was played by Mexican big band wind orchestras.

=== 1950s-1960s: Cuban music in New York City ===
The Palladium Ballroom, home of the mambo, c. 1950s.

During the 1950s, New York became a hotspot of Mambo with musicians like the aforementioned Pérez Prado, Luciano "Chano" Pozo, Mongo Santamaría, Machito and Tito Puente. The highly popular Palladium Ballroom was the epicenter of mambo in New York.

Ethnomusicologist Ed Morales notes that the interaction of Afro-Cuban and jazz music in New York was crucial to the innovation of both forms of music. Musicians who would become great innovators of mambo, like Mario Bauzá and Chano Pozo, began their careers in New York working in close conjunction with some of the biggest names in jazz, like Cab Calloway, Ella Fitzgerald, and Dizzy Gillespie, among others. Morales noted that: "The interconnection between North American jazz and Afro-Cuban music was taken for granted, and the stage was set for the emergence of mambo music in New York, where music fans were becoming accustomed to innovation." He later notes that Mambo helped pave the way for the widespread acceptance of salsa years later.

Another popular style was cha-cha-cha, which originated in the Charanga bands in Cuba. By the early 1960s, there were several charanga bands in New York led by musicians (like Johnny Pacheco, Charlie Palmieri, Mongo Santamaría and Ray Barretto) who would later become salsa stars.

In 1952, Arsenio Rodríguez moved for a short period to New York City taking with him his modern son montuno. During that period his success was limited (NYC was more interested in Mambo), but his guajeos (who influenced the musicians he shared the stage with, such as Chano Pozo, Machito, and Mario Bauzá), together with the piano tumbaos of Lilí Martínez, the trumpet of Félix Chappottín and the rhythmic lead vocals of Roberto Faz would become very relevant in the region a decade later.

In 1966, the Palladium closed because it lost its liquor license. The mambo faded away, as new hybrid styles such as boogaloo, the jala-jala and the shing-a-ling had brief but important success. Elements of boogaloo can be heard in some songs of Tito Puente, Eddie Palmieri, Machito and even Arsenio Rodríguez. Nonetheless, Puente later recounted: "It stunk ... I recorded it to keep up with the times. Popular Boogaloo songs include "Bang Bang" by the Joe Cuba Sextet and "I Like It Like That" by Pete Rodríguez and His Orchestra.

During the late 1960s, the Dominican musician Johnny Pacheco and Italian-American businessman Jerry Masucci founded the recording company Fania Records. They introduced many of the artists that would later be identified with the salsa movement, including Willie Colón, Celia Cruz, Larry Harlow, Ray Barretto, Héctor Lavoe and Ismael Miranda. Fania's first record album was "Cañonazo", recorded and released in 1964. It was panned by music critics as 10 of the 11 songs were covers of previously recorded tunes by such Cuban artists as Sonora Matancera, Chappottín y Sus Estrellas and Conjunto Estrellas de Chocolate. Pacheco put together a team that included percussionist Louie Ramírez, bassist Bobby Valentín and arranger Larry Harlow to form the Fania All-Stars in 1968. Meanwhile, the Puerto Rican band La Sonora Ponceña recorded two albums named after songs of Arsenio Rodriguez (Hachero pa' un palo and Fuego en el 23).

=== 1970s: Songo in Cuba, salsa in NYC ===
The 1970s was witness to two parallel modernizations of the Cuban son in Havana and in New York. During this period the term salsa was introduced in New York, and songo was developed in Havana.

The band Los Van Van, led by the bassist Juan Formell, started developing songo in the late 1960s. Songo incorporated rhythmic elements from folkloric rumba as well as funk and rock to the traditional son. With the arrival of the drummer Changuito, several new rhythms were introduced and the style had a more significant departure from the son montuno/mambo-based structure.

Songo integrated several elements of North American styles like jazz, rock and funk in many different ways than mainstream salsa. Whereas salsa would superimpose elements of another genre in the bridge of a song, the songo was considered a rhythmic and harmonic hybrid (particularly regarding funk and clave-based Cuban elements). The music analyst Kevin Moore stated: "The harmonies, never before heard in Cuban music, were clearly borrowed from North American pop [and] shattered the formulaic limitations on harmony to which Cuban popular music had faithfully adhered for so long." During the same period, Cuban super group Irakere fused bebop and funk with batá drums and other Afro-Cuban folkloric elements; Orquesta Ritmo Oriental created a new highly syncopated, rumba-influenced son in the charanga ensemble; and Elio Revé developed changüí.

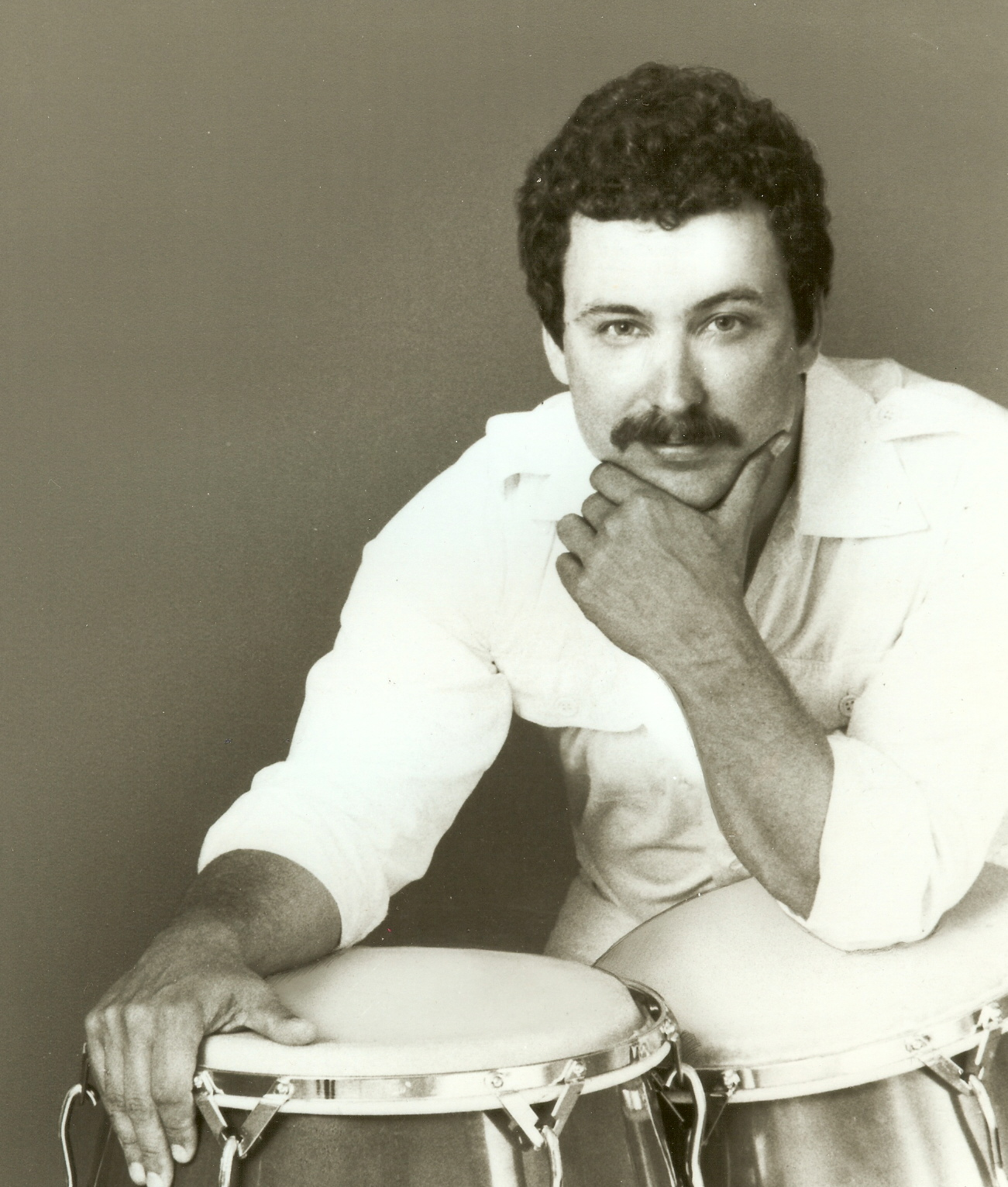
Roger Dawson hosted a very popular Las Vegas radio show featuring salsa.

On the other hand, New York saw in the 1970s the first use of the term salsa to commercialize several styles of Latin dance music. However, several musicians believe that salsa took on a life of its own, organically evolving into an authentic pan-Latin American cultural identity. Music professor and salsa trombonist Christopher Washburne wrote:

This pan-Latino association of salsa stems from what Félix Padilla labels a 'Latinizing' process that occurred in the 1960s and was consciously marketed by Fania Records: 'To Fania, the Latinizing of salsa came to mean homogenizing the product, presenting an all-embracing Puerto Rican, Pan-American or Latino sound with which the people from all of Latin America and Spanish-speaking communities in the United States could identify and purchase.' Motivated primarily by economic factors, Fania's push for countries throughout Latin America to embrace salsa did result in an expanded market. But in addition, throughout the 1970s, salsa groups from Colombia, the Dominican Republic, and Venezuela, among other Latin American nations, emerged, composing and performing music that related to their own specific cultural experiences and affiliations, which posited salsa as a cultural identity marker for those nations as well.

In 1971, the Fania All-Stars sold out Yankee Stadium. By the early 1970s, the music's center moved to Manhattan and the Cheetah, where promoter Ralph Mercado introduced many future Puerto Rican salsa stars to an ever-growing and diverse crowd of Latino audiences. The 1970s also brought new semi-known Salsa bands from New York City, bands such as Ángel Canales, Andy Harlow, Chino Rodríguez y su Consagracion (Chino Rodríguez was one of the first Chinese Puerto Rican artists that caught the eye of Fania Record's owner Jerry Masucci and later became the booking agent for many of the Fania artists.), Wayne Gorbea, Ernie Agusto y la Conspiración, Orchestra Ray Jay, Orchestra Fuego, and Orchestra Cimarron, among other bands that were performing in the Salsa market on the East Coast.

Celia Cruz, who had had a successful career in Cuba with Sonora Matancera, was able to transition into the salsa movement, eventually becoming known as the Queen of Salsa.

Larry Harlow stretched out from the typical salsa record formula with his opera Hommy (1973), inspired by The Who's Tommy album, and also released his critically acclaimed La Raza Latina, a Salsa Suite.

In 1975, Roger Dawson created the "Sunday Salsa Show" over WRVR FM, which became one of the highest-rated radio shows in the New York market with a reported audience of over a quarter of a million listeners every Sunday (per Arbitron Radio Ratings). Ironically, although New York's Hispanic population at that time was over two million, there had been no commercial Hispanic FM. Given his jazz and salsa conga playing experience and knowledge (working as a sideman with such bands as salsa's Frankie Dante's Orquesta Flamboyán and jazz saxophonist Archie Shepp), Dawson also created the long-running "Salsa Meets Jazz" weekly concert series at the Village Gate jazz club where jazz musicians would sit in with an established salsa band, for example Dexter Gordon jamming with the Machito band. Dawson helped to broaden New York's salsa audience and introduced new artists such as the bilingual Ángel Canales who were not given play on the Hispanic AM stations of that time. His show won several awards from the readers of Latin New York magazine, Izzy Sanabria's Salsa Magazine at that time and ran until late 1980 when Viacom changed the format of WRVR to country music.

Despite an openness to experimentation and a willingness to absorb non-Cuban influences, such as jazz, R&B, bomba and plena, and already existing mambo-jazz, the percentage of salsa compositions based in non-Cuban genres during this period in New York is quite low, and, contrary to songo, salsa remained consistently wedded to older Cuban templates. According to Izzy Sanabria, “the youth rejected the music of our parents from Puerto Rico and continued developing Cuban son.” Some believe the pan-Latin Americanism of salsa was found in its cultural milieu, more than its musical structure.

An exception of this is probably found in the work of Eddie Palmieri and Manny Oquendo, who were considered more adventurous than the highly produced Fania records artists. The two bands incorporated less superficially jazz elements as well as the contemporary Mozambique (music). They were known for its virtuous trombone soloists like Barry Rogers (and other "Anglo" jazz musicians who had mastered the style). Andy González, a bass player who performed with Palmieri and Oquendo recounts: "We were into improvising ... doing that thing Miles Davis was doing — playing themes and just improvising on the themes of songs, and we never stopped playing through the whole set." Andy and his brother Jerry González started showing up in the DownBeat Reader's Poll, and caught the attention of jazz critics.

=== 1980s: Salsa expansion in Latin America and the birth of timba ===
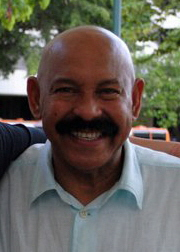
Oscar D'Leon (2011)

During the 1980s, several Latin American countries, such as Colombia, Venezuela, Peru, Mexico and Panama, began producing their own salsa music. Two of the biggest stars from this period are Oscar D'León from Venezuela and Joe Arroyo from Colombia. Other popular acts are Fruko y sus Tesos, Grupo Niche and Rubén Blades (now as a soloist).

During this period Cuba received international salsa musicians for the first time.

Venezuelan salsa star Oscar D'León's 1983 tour of Cuba is mentioned prominently by every Cuban I've ever interviewed on the subject. Rubén Blades' album Siembra was heard everywhere on the island throughout the mid-80s and has been quoted extensively in the guías and coros of everyone from Van Van's Mayito Rivera (who quotes [Blades'] 'Plástico' in his guías on the 1997 classic Llévala a tu vacilón), to El Médico de la Salsa (quoting another major hook from 'Plástico'—'se ven en la cara, se ven en la cara, nunca en el corazón'—in his final masterpiece before leaving Cuba, Diós sabe).

Prior to D'León's performance, many Cuban musicians rejected the salsa movement, considering it a bad imitation of Cuban music. Some people say that D'León's performance gave momentum to a "salsa craze" that brought back some of the older templates and motivated the development of timba.

Before the birth of timba, Cuban dance music lived a period of high experimentation among several bands like the charangas: Los Van Van, Orquesta Ritmo Oriental, and Orquesta Revé; the conjuntos: Adalberto Alvarez y Son 14, Conjunto Rumbavana and Orquesta Maravillas de Florida; and the jazz band Irakere.

Timba was created by musicians of Irakere who later formed NG La Banda under the direction of Jose Luis "El Tosco" Cortez. Many timba songs are more related to main-stream salsa than its Cuban predecessors earlier in the decade. For example, the song "La expresiva" (of NG La Banda) uses typical salsa timba/bongo bell combinations. The tumbadoras (congas) play elaborate variations on the son montuno-based tumbao, rather than in the songo style. For this reason some Cuban musicians of this period like Manolito y su Trabuco, Orquesta Sublime, and Irakere referred to this late-80s sound as salsa cubana, a term which for the first time, included Cuban music as a part of salsa movement. In the mid-1990s California-based Bembé Records released CDs by several Cuban bands, as part of their salsa cubana series.

Nonetheless, this style included several innovations. The bass tumbaos were busier and more complex than tumbaos typically heard in NY salsa. Some guajeos were inspired by the "harmonic displacement" technique of the Cuban jazz pianist Gonzalo Rubalcaba. Curiously, it was in Cuba where hip-hop and salsa first began to meet. For example, many breakdown sections in NG La Banda's album En la calle are a combination of guaguancó and hip-hop rhythms.

During this period, Cuban musicians had more of an impact on jazz than salsa in the United States. Even though the Mariel boatlift took hundreds of Cuban musicians to the US, many of them were astonished to hear what sounded to them like Cuban music from the 1950s. Cuban conguero Daniel Ponce summarized this sentiment: "When the Cubans arrived in New York, they all said 'Yuk! This is old music.' The music and the feelings and arrangements [haven't] changed." Nonetheless, there was an awareness of the modern Cuban styles in the US. Tito Puente recorded the Irakere composition "Bacalao con pan" (1980), and Rubén Blades covered Los Van Van's "Muevete" (1985). While the Puerto Rican bands Batacumbele (featuring a young Giovanni Hidalgo) and Zaperoko fully embraced songo music under the mentorship of Changuito.

During the '80s other variants of salsa like salsa romántica and salsa erótica evolved, with lyrics dwelling on love and romance. Salsa romántica can be traced back to Noches Calientes, a 1984 album by singer José Alberto "El Canario" with producer Louie Ramírez. Some viewed salsa romántica as a rhythmically watered-down version of the genre. Critics of salsa romántica, especially in the late '80s and early '90s, called it a commercialized, diluted form of Latin pop, in which formulaic, sentimental love ballads were simply put to Afro-Cuban rhythms — leaving no room for classic salsa's brilliant musical improvisation, or for classic salsa lyrics that tell stories of daily life or provide social and political commentary. Some artists of these styles include Ómar Alfann, Palmer Hernández and Jorge Luis Piloto.

=== 1990s: Pop salsa and timba explosion ===
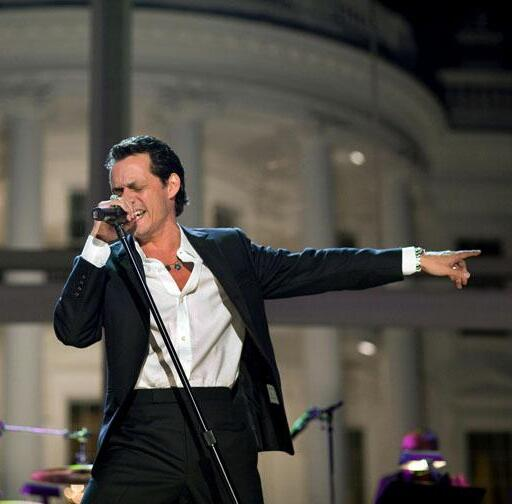
Marc Anthony performing at the White House (2009)

The 1990s was marked by "pop salsa" in the US, and the "timba explosion" in Cuba.

Sergio George produced several albums that mixed salsa with contemporary pop styles with Puerto Rican artists like Tito Nieves, La India, and Marc Anthony. George also produced the Japanese salsa band Orquesta de la Luz. Brenda K. Starr, Son By Four, Víctor Manuelle, and the Cuban-American singer Gloria Estefan enjoyed crossover success within the Anglo-American pop market with their Latin-influenced hits, usually sung in English. More often than not, clave was not a major consideration in the composing or arranging of these hits. Sergio George is up front and unapologetic about his attitude towards clave: "Though clave is considered, it is not always the most important thing in my music. The foremost issue in my mind is marketability. If the song hits, that's what matters. When I stopped trying to impress musicians and started getting in touch with what the people on the street were listening to, I started writing hits. Some songs, especially English ones originating in the United States, are at times impossible to place in clave." As Washburne points out however, a lack of clave awareness does not always get a pass:

Marc Anthony is a product of George's innovationist approach. As a novice to Latin music, he was propelled into band leader position with little knowledge of how the music was structured. One revealing moment came during a performance in 1994, just after he had launched his salsa career. During a piano solo he approached the timbales, picked up a stick, and attempted to play clave on the clave block along with the band. It became apparent that he had no idea where to place the rhythm. Shortly thereafter during a radio interview in San Juan (Puerto Rico), he exclaimed that his commercial success proved that you did not need to know about clave to make it in Latin music. This comment caused an uproar both in Puerto Rico and New York. After receiving the bad press, Anthony refrained from discussing the subject in public, and he did not attempt to play clave on stage until he had received some private lessons.

In Cuba, what came to be known as the "timba explosion" began with the debut album of La Charanga Habanera, Me Sube La Fiebre, in 1992. Like NG La Banda, Charanga Habanera used several new techniques like gear changes and song-specific tumbaos, but their musical style was drastically different and it kept changing and evolving with each album. Charanga Habanera underwent three distinct style periods in the 90s, represented by the three albums Manolín "El Médico de la salsa", an amateur songwriter discovered and named by El Tosco (NG La Banda) at med school, was another superstar of the period. Manolín's creative team included several arrangers, including Luis Bu and Chaka Nápoles. As influential as Manolín was from a strictly musical point of view, his charisma, popularity and unprecedented earning power had an even more seismic impact, causing a level of excitement among musicians that had not been seen since the 1950s. Reggie Jackson referred to Manolin as "the straw that stirs the drink."—Moore (2010: v. 5: 18)

The term salsa cubana which had barely taken hold, again fell out of favor, and was replaced with timba. Some of the other important timba bands include Azúcar Negra, Manolín "El Médico de la salsa", Havana d'Primera, Klimax, Paulito FG, Salsa Mayor, Tiempo Libre, Pachito Alonso y sus Kini Kini, Bamboleo, Los Dan Den, Alain Pérez, Issac Delgado, Tirso Duarte, Klimax, Manolito y su Trabuco, Paulo FG, and Pupy y Los que Son Son.

Cuban timba musicians and New York salsa musicians have had positive and creative exchanges over the years, but the two genres remained somewhat separated, appealing to different audiences. Nonetheless, in 2000 Los Van Van were awarded the first ever Grammy Award for Best Salsa Album.

In Colombia, salsa remained a popular style of music producing popular bands like Sonora Carruseles, Carlos Vives, Orquesta Guayacan, Grupo Niche, Kike Santander, and Julian Collazos. The city of Cali became known as Colombia's "capital of salsa". In Venezuela, Cabijazz was playing a unique modern blend of timba-like salsa with a strong jazz influence.

=== 2010s: Timba-fusion hits ===
During the late 00s and the 10s, some timba bands created new hybrids of salsa, timba, hip-hop and reggaeton (for example Charanga Habanera - Gozando en la Habana and Pupy y Los que Son, Son-Loco con una moto). A few years later the Cuban reggaeton band Gente de Zona and Marc Anthony produced the timba-reggaeton international mega-hit La Gozadera reaching over a billion views in YouTube.

The style known as Cubaton, that was also popular during this period, was mostly based on reggaeton with only some hints of salsa/timba.

== African salsa ==
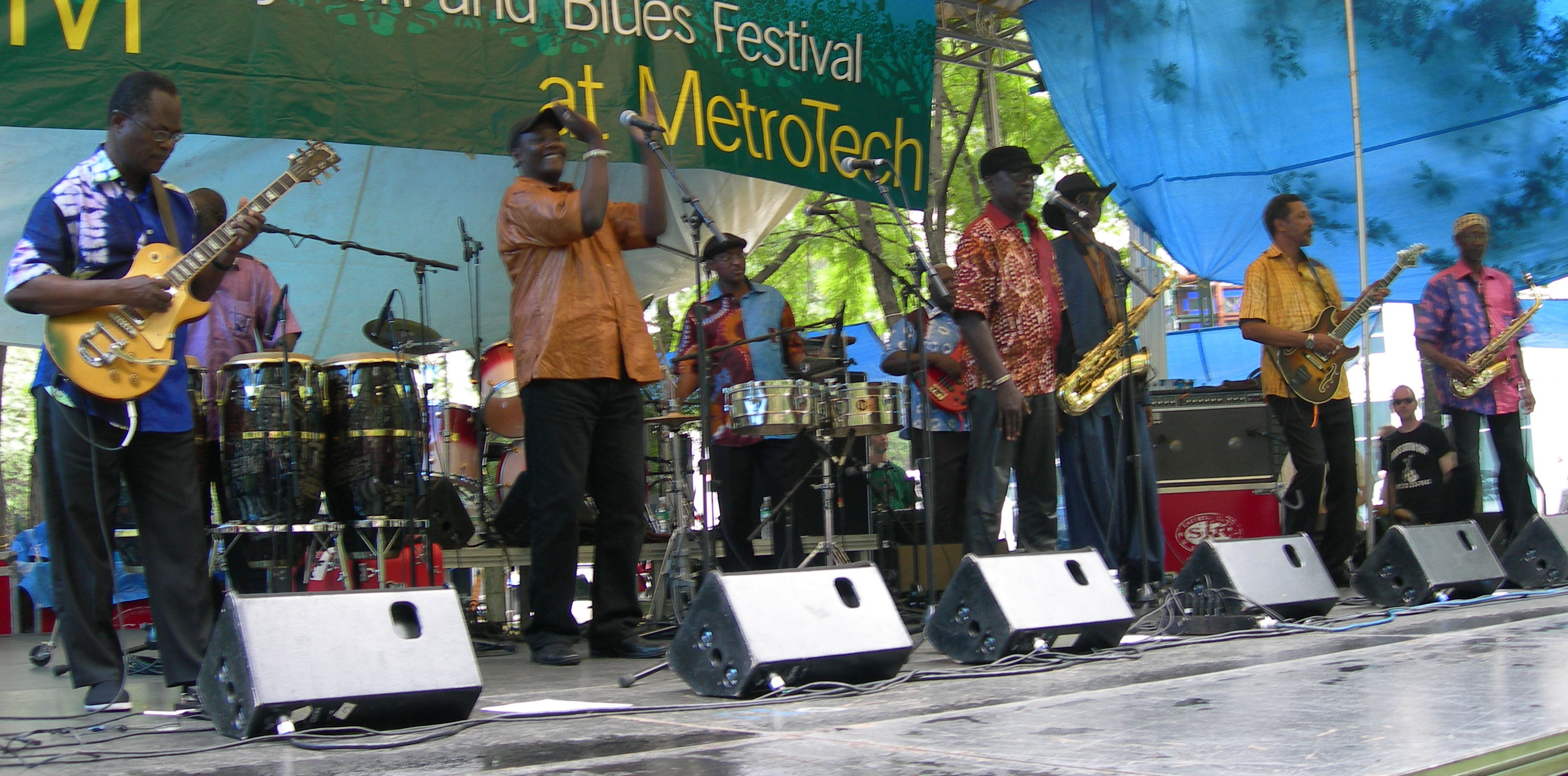
Orchestra Baobab

Cuban music has been popular in sub-Saharan Africa since the mid twentieth century. To the Africans, clave-based Cuban popular music sounded both familiar and exotic. The Encyclopedia of Africa v. 1. states:

Beginning in the 1940s, Afro-Cuban [son] groups such as Septeto Habanero and Trio Matamoros gained widespread popularity in the Congo region as a result of airplay over Radio Congo Belge, a powerful radio station based in Léopoldville (now Kinshasa DRC). A proliferation of music clubs, recording studios, and concert appearances of Cuban bands in Léopoldville spurred on the Cuban music trend during the late 1940s and 1950s.

Congolese bands started doing Cuban covers and singing the lyrics phonetically. Soon, they were creating their own original Cuban-like compositions, with lyrics sung in French or Lingala, a lingua franca of the western Congo region. The Congolese called this new music rumba, although it was really based on the son. The Africans adapted guajeos to electric guitars, and gave them their own regional flavor. The guitar-based music gradually spread out from the Congo, increasingly taking on local sensibilities. This process eventually resulted in the establishment of several different distinct regional genres, such as soukous.

Cuban popular music played a major role in the development of many contemporary genres of African popular music. John Storm Roberts states: "It was the Cuban connection, but increasingly also New York salsa, that provided the major and enduring influences—the ones that went deeper than earlier imitation or passing fashion. The Cuban connection began very early and was to last at least twenty years, being gradually absorbed and re-Africanized." The re-working of Afro-Cuban rhythmic patterns by Africans brings the rhythms full circle.

The re-working of the harmonic patterns reveals a striking difference in perception. The I IV V IV harmonic progression, so common in Cuban music, is heard in pop music all across the African continent, thanks to the influence of Cuban music. Those chords move in accordance with the basic tenets of Western music theory. However, as Gerhard Kubik points out, performers of African popular music do not necessarily perceive these progressions in the same way: "The harmonic cycle of C-F-G-F [I-IV-V-IV] prominent in Congo/Zaire popular music simply cannot be defined as a progression from tonic to subdominant to dominant and back to subdominant (on which it ends) because in the performer's appreciation they are of equal status, and not in any hierarchical order as in Western music."

The largest wave of Cuban-based music to hit Africa was in the form of salsa. In 1974 the Fania All Stars performed in Zaire (known today as the Democratic Republic of the Congo), Africa, at the 80,000-seat Stadu du Hai in Kinshasa. This was captured on film and released as Live In Africa (Salsa Madness in the UK). The Zairean appearance occurred at a music festival held in conjunction with the Muhammad Ali/George Foreman heavyweight title fight. Local genres were already well established by this time. Even so, salsa caught on in many African countries, especially in the Senegambia and Mali. Cuban music had been the favorite of Senegal's nightspot in the 1950s to 1960s. The Senegalese band Orchestra Baobab plays in a basic salsa style with congas and timbales, but with the addition of Wolof and Mandinka instruments and lyrics.

According to Lise Waxer, "African salsa points not so much to a return of salsa to African soil (Steward 1999: 157) but to a complex process of cultural appropriation between two regions of the so-called Third World." Since the mid-1990s African artists have also been very active through the super-group Africando, where African and New York musicians mix with leading African singers such as Bambino Diabate, Ricardo Lemvo, Ismael Lo and Salif Keita. It is still common today for an African artist to record a salsa tune, and add their own particular regional touch to it.

== Lyrics ==
Salsa lyrics range from simple dance numbers, and sentimental romantic songs, to risque and politically radical subject matter. Music author Isabelle Leymarie notes that salsa performers often incorporate machoistic bravado (guapería) in their lyrics, in a manner reminiscent of calypso and samba, a theme she ascribes to the performers' "humble backgrounds" and subsequent need to compensate for their origins. Leymarie claims that salsa is "essentially virile, an affirmation of the man's pride and identity". As an extension of salsa's macho stance, manly taunts and challenges (desafio) are also a traditional part of salsa.

Salsa lyrics often quote from traditional Cuban sones and rumbas. Sometimes there are references to Afro-Cuban religions, such as Santeria, even by artists who are not themselves practitioners of the faith. Salsa lyrics also exhibit Puerto Rican influences. Hector LaVoe, who sang with Willie Colón for nearly a decade used typical Puerto Rican phrasing in his singing. It is not uncommon now to hear the Puerto Rican declamatory exclamation "le-lo-lai" in salsa. Politically and socially activist composers have long been an important part of salsa, and some of their works, like Eddie Palmieri's "La libertad - lógico", became Latin, and especially Puerto Rican anthems. The Panamanian singer Ruben Blades in particular is well known for his socially-conscious and incisive salsa lyrics about everything from imperialism to disarmament and environmentalism, which have resonated with audiences throughout Latin America. Many salsa songs contain a nationalist theme, centered around a sense of pride in black Latino identity, and may be in Spanish, English or a mixture of the two called Spanglish.

== Films ==
- 1979 - Salsa: Latin Music in the Cities. Directed by Jeremy Marre.
- 1988 - Salsa. Former Menudo member Robi Draco Rosa plays a teenager who wants to win a dance contest. Celia Cruz, Wilkins and Tito Puente also appear.
- 1996 - Giovanni Hidalgo – In The Tradition. Hidalgo introduces basic sounds, tuning and technique, patterns of son montuno, bolero, charanga, danzón and multi-percussion applications of those forms.
- 2007 - El Cantante. El Cantante is a biographical film which stars singers Marc Anthony and Jennifer Lopez. The film is based on the life of the late salsa singer Héctor Lavoe, who is portrayed by Anthony.
- 2014 - Sex, Love & Salsa. Directed by Adrian Manzano. Choreographer: Julie L Tuttlebee. Salsa dancer Julie Tuttlebee also features in several scenes.

== See also ==
- International Salsa Museum
- Latin Grammy Award for Best Salsa Album
- Music of the United States
- Twoubadou
