= Manolín "El Médico de la salsa" =

Manuel "Manolín" González Hernández ("El Médico de la Salsa"), is a Cuban timba and salsa songwriter, singer, and band leader. Manolín was an amateur songwriter, when NG La Banda's leader José Luis "El Tosco" Cortés discovered him at medical school and famously dubbed him "El Médico de la Salsa".

== Cultural significance ==
His background as a medical student who turned to music out of dissatisfaction with his life possibilities reflects the frustration of an entire generation of Afro-Cubans. Manolín came out in 1992, and by 1994, there were antigovernment riots in the streets of Los Sitios in Havana, a black neighborhood. In this way, Manolín was “a character perfectly tuned to the new social reality of the special period” (Perna 2005, 67). As the life of ordinary Cubans receded to 4th World levels, the stars of salsa projected a representation of success and sophistication, an image of escapism and self-empowerment, which, in the context of the decline of the economic role of the state, acquired obvious political meanings. In 1996, a doctor earned $15 per month, while Manolín earned $9,200 per month. His success seemed to represent the triumph of materialism and individualism over revolutionary moral values. According to Manolín, “people started associating money with me.” Manolín, Paulito FG, and bands like La Charanga Habanera and Bamboleo became symbols of the new market-adjusted pop artist, articulating into a modern, cosmopolitan image the desires and aspirations of their young black barrio audiences (Vaughan 2012: Kindle 1964).

== Musical significance ==
Manolín's music was as different from Charanga Habanera as Charanga Habanera was from NG La Banda. His creative team included several arrangers, including pianist Luis Bu and Chaka Nápoles. Manolín's rhythm section was one of the most popular in Cuba. Manolín's unprecedented earning power had a seismic impact on the timba scene, causing a level of excitement among musicians that had not been seen since the 1950s, if ever.

"El médico de la Salsa" had many conflicts with the Cuban government, ultimately leading to his famous chorus "El puente," and his subsequent flight from Cuba. He was a legal resident of Miami, Florida for some time. As of 2013, Manolín has moved back to Cuba, and has been touring the island with Pachito Alonso y su Kini-Kini.

== Discography ==
- (1994) Una aventura loca.
- (1995) Para mi gente.
- (1997) De buena fe.
- (1998) Jaque mate.
- (2001) El puente. (live in Hialeah, FL).
- (2003) Giro total.
- (2004) Hall of Fame: Historia musical.
- (2004) La mitad ... de Miami. (compilation).
- (2006) Grandes éxitos. (compilation).
- (2012) Tiene que ser Manolín.

== Sources ==
- Moore, Kevin (2010: 11). Beyond Salsa Piano; The Cuban Timba Piano Revolution. v. 5 Introduction to Timba. ISBN 978-1-4505-4559-4
- Moore, Kevin (2013: web). "Manolín 'El Médico de la Salsa'" Timba.com.
- Perna, Vincenzo A. (2005). Timba: The Sound of the Cuban Crisis. Burlington, Vermont: Ashgate Publishing Company
- Vaughan, Umi (2012). Rebel Dance, Renegade Stance:Timba Music and Black Identity in Cuba The University of Michigan Press. Kindle Edition.
