= International Salsa Museum =

Proposed music museum in New York City

- Established: 2021; 5 years ago
- Type: Music museum
- Website: www.internationalsalsamuseum.org

The International Salsa Museum (ISM) is a museum in development in New York City dedicated to preserving and celebrating the history, evolution, and global impact of salsa music and dance. It has garnered support from the estates of salsa icons Tito Puente and Celia Cruz, as well as many other musicians, dancers, choreographers, and industry professionals. ISM's leaders hope to open a permanent site in 2029.

== History and mission ==
The museum was co-founded in 2021 by Willy Rodriguez, Manny Tavarez, and Ilialis Reyes. Rodriguez, musical director of the Tito Puente Jr. Orchestra, was inspired to create the museum by the passing of many salsa legends and the need to preserve their legacy for future generations. In 2023, plans to locate the museum in the Kingsbridge Armory in the Bronx were announced.

The ISM aims to preserve the past by collecting and showcasing artifacts related to salsa's history, educate the present through exhibitions, programs, and events that explore the music's cultural significance, and influence the future by fostering the next generation of salsa musicians and dancers through educational initiatives.

== Activities and exhibits ==
Although a permanent space is still under development, the ISM actively brings salsa to the community through pop-up events featuring live music, dance performances, and exhibitions of salsa memorabilia. It partners with organizations like the New York International Salsa Congress to host events and tributes, collaborates with the NYPD's youth program to engage young people through music, and offers digital experiences, scholarships, and other programming.

Museum exhibits feature art, clothing, instruments, and photography of legendary musicians like Tito Puente, La Lupe, the first Latina to perform at Carnegie Hall and Madison Square Garden, percussionist Ralph Irizarry, singer/songwriter Luis Figueroa, and choreographer Eddie Torres Sr.
