= NG La Banda =

Cuban musical group

NG La Banda is a Cuban musical group founded by flutist José Luis "El Tosco" Cortés. NG stands for nueva generación ('new generation'). NG La Banda are one of the creators of timba (a term coined by Cortés), the most important popular dance and music genre of the past two decades. Prior to founding NG La Banda, Cortés played in the Afro-Cuban jazz-fusion supergroup Irakere, and the seminal songo band Los Van Van.

== The next generation ==
Before leaving Irakere, El Tosco had begun what was to be an experimental side-project to "make a study of Cuban music and Jazz". It was known alternately as "Nueva Generación" and "Orquesta Todos Estrellas". The members were handpicked from the raging Cuban Jazz scene of the 80's and included such giants as Gonzálo Rubalcalba, Hernán López-Nussa, Horacio "El Negro" Hernández, Calixto Oviedo and most of the musicians who would later become NG La Banda . The group produced four vinyl records which have never been released on CD although some of the tracks can be found on compilations. Somewhere along the way, Tosco's vision for what would ultimately become NG La Banda began to materialize. As he told Jordan Levin of the Miami Herald, "I wanted to do something with the flavor of Van Van and the musical aggressiveness of Irakere...to give [popular music] the same artistic and aesthetic value that we give to other great forms of music"—Moore (2001).

== The birth of timba ==
One of the first timba albums was NG's En la calle (1989). This was followed by No se puede tapar el sol (1990), and En la calle otra vez (1991). None of these phonorecords were released on CD in their entirety, but Ned Sublette's QBADisc label released a nine-track compilation in 1992. NG La Banda's horn section is affectionately known as “los metales del terror” or metals of terror. So important is the work of the horn section inside the timba format that this naming of the horn section itself has become common.

=== "La expresiva" ===
The track "La expresiva," featuring the lead vocals of Issac Delgado, is emblematic of the early timba innovations by NG La Banda. Departing from the rumba-inspired percussion parts of the previous songo era, "La expresiva" uses typical salsa bell patterns creatively incorporated into a Cuban-style timbales/drum kit hybrid. The tumbadora ('conga') plays elaborate variations on the son montuno-based tumbao, rather than in the songo style. The bass tumbaos of Feliciano Arango are busier than typically heard in salsa and Cuba dance music.

Break-down

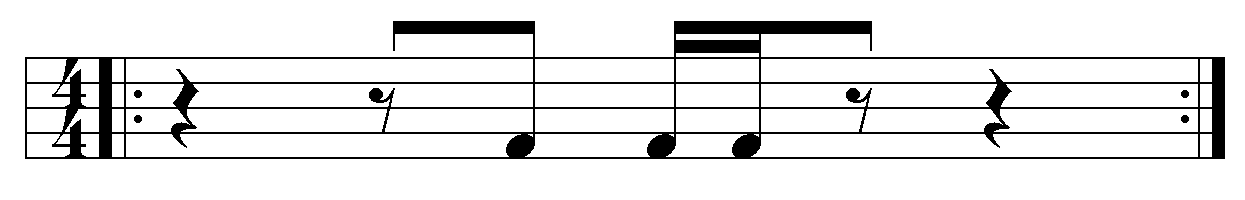
Segundo (mid drum) accent in early rumba break-down, "La polemica." Los Muñequitos de Matanzas (1988).

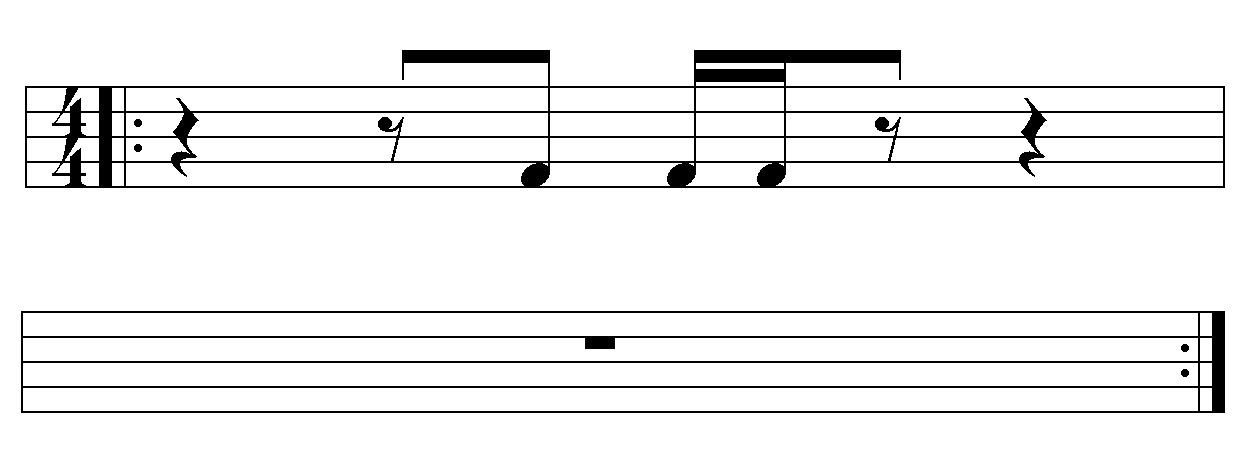
Accent in early timba break-down, "La expresiva." NG La Banda (1989).

"La expresiva" introduced the phenomenon of timba break-downs, where the bass momentarily stops playing tumbao, and changes to glissandos ('slides') and accented percussive "punches," that resemble drum strokes more than bass notes. These break-downs share similarities with the rumba break-downs (where the lowest pitched drum drops out) of that era. For example, the "punches" heard in "La expresiva's" break-down (3:31) are essentially the same pattern heard on the rumba "La polemica" by Los Muñequitos de Matanzas, during that song's break-down (3:38).

"La expresiva" brought the clave-based, be-bop flavored horn lines pioneered by Irakere into mainstream Cuban popular dance music. This marked a significant departure from the more "angular" guajeo-based horn lines typical of the son montuno, mambo, and salsa.

Timba researcher Kevin Moore offers a clave analysis of "La expresiva":

After the first mambo at 1:15, the clave changes from 2-3 [clave] to 3-2 [clave]. The last two beats of the mambo are omitted and the next section begins on the other side of the clave with only piano and güiro. At first it sounds like the piano is finishing the 2-3 phrase but it’s actually starting a new one in 3-2 as confirmed by the later entrance of the coro. The same process occurs in reverse at the end, when the opening horn section comes back briefly in 2-3 (2001).

== The three main phases of NG La Banda's development ==
=== 1988-1992 ===
The Early Period: early timba songs "La expresiva" and "Los sitios entero", featuring Giraldo Piloto on drums and the vocals of Issac Delgado. Most of the tracks can be found on compilations such as the QBADisc release En la Calle.

=== 1992-1996 ===
The Middle Period: classic timba songs as "Santa palabra" and "Echale limón", Calixto Oviedo took over for Piloto on drums. These albums are available on CD.

=== 1996 to 2001 ===
The Late Period: NG began to gradually break away from pure timba and moved into an experimental phase, with songs such as "La medicina" and "La dura".

== NG La Banda within the context of contemporary Cuban Society ==
NG La Banda became known as the music of the people, emanating from the barrios and the poorest parts of Havana, yet many intellectuals deemed it too dirty and vulgar to be a valid art form. Cortes became known as "El Tosco" or "Rude Boy" because of his sexual lyrics and unabashed stage and street presence. As a result of NG La Banda's success, many more timba bands sprung up throughout the 1990s. "The intellectuals say that timba is crap," Cortés says."But this is a racist concept. Cuban popular music has always been the music of the people, of the poor barrios, where there are very few whites. This is the music that comes from below, that makes people want to dance. But just because people dance to it doesn't mean it's not as serious as any other serious music. Timba is not your father's, or your grandfather's, Cuban music; not the sweet traditional sounds of the international hit Buena Vista Social Club. Timba is the sound of Cuba now, a rhythmically dense, relentlessly energetic music played by highly skilled musicians for a demanding dance-floor audience, with lyrics that draw from and become part of the language of the streets."

As a music style, timba crystallized in the late 1980s largely thanks to the experimentations of NG La Banda, a band led by black flute player and composer José Luís Cortés, who made his music into the voice of the marginal black barrios of the capital city . . . in the early 1990s the novel style moved to the centre of the popular musical scene of Havana. Thanks to the fertile ground provided by the boom of international tourism, timba became the mainstay of night entertainment and the sound-track of the new tourist dolce vita—Perna (2005)

== Discography ==
- No te compliques (1988); En la calle (1990)
- No se puede tapar el sol con un dedo (1990)
- En la calle otra vez (1991)
- En cuerpo y el alma (1991) (live)
- Échale limón [Japanese version] (1992)
- Échale limón [Cuban version] (1993)
- Para Curaçao (1993)
- La que manda (1994)
- La bruja (1994)
- En directo desde el patio de mi casa (1995)
- De allá pa' acá (1996)
- La cachimba (1996)
- Veneno (1998)
- Baila conmigo (2000)
- Mis 22 años (2013)
