= Son montuno =

Music subgenre of son cubano

- Stylistic origins: Son cubano by septetos and sextetos
- Cultural origins: 1940s, Cuba
- Typical instruments: Tres; trumpets; piano; double bass; bongos; congas; cowbell; claves; maracas; güiro; timbales

Fusion genres
- Son capetillo

Other topics
- Clave

Son montuno (Spanish pronunciation: [ˈsom monˈtuno]) is a subgenre of son cubano developed by Arsenio Rodríguez in the 1940s. Although son montuno ("mountain sound") had previously referred to the sones played in the mountains of eastern Cuba, Arsenio repurposed the term to denote a highly sophisticated approach to the genre in which the montuno section contained complex horn arrangements. He also incorporated piano solos and often subverted the structure of songs by starting with the montuno in a cyclic fashion. For his approach, Arsenio had to expand the existing septeto ensemble into the conjunto format which became the norm in the 1940s alongside big bands. Arsenio's developments eventually served as the template for the development of genres such as salsa, songo and timba.

== Background ==
Son cubano developed in the late 19th century and soon became the most important genre of Cuban popular music. In addition, it is perhaps the most flexible of all forms of Latin American music, and is the foundation of many Cuban-based dance forms, and salsa. Its great strength is its fusion between European and African musical traditions.

The son arose in Oriente, merging the Spanish guitar and lyrical traditions with Afro-Cuban percussion and rhythms. We now know that its history as a distinct form is relatively recent. There is no evidence that it goes back further than the end of the nineteenth century. It moved from Oriente to Havana in about 1909, carried by members of the Permanent (the Army), who were sent out of their areas of origin as a matter of policy. The first recordings were in 1918.

There are many types of son, of which the son montuno is one. The term has been used in several ways. Probably the 'montuno' originally referred to its origin in the mountainous regions of eastern Cuba; eventually, it was used more to describe the final up-tempo section of a son, with its semi-improvisation, repetitive vocal refrain and brash instrumental climax. The term was being used in the 1920s, when son sextetos set up in Havana and competed strongly with the older danzones.

== Development of the son montuno form ==
Cuban tresero, songwriter and bandleader Arsenio Rodríguez is considered the main figure in the development of son montuno as a form of dance music. He made several key innovations in the way rhythm is used in son cubano, leading to more complex arrangements which revolutionized the genre. The denser rhythmic weave of Rodríguez's music required the addition of more instruments. Rodríguez added a second, and then, third trumpet, as well as the piano and the conga drum, the quintessential Afro-Cuban instrument. His bongo player used a large, hand-held cencerro ('cowbell') during montunos (call-and-response chorus section).

=== Layered guajeos ===
Arsenio Rodríguez introduced the idea of layered guajeos (typical Cuban ostinato melodies)—an interlocking structure consisting of multiple contrapuntal parts. This aspect of the son's modernization can be thought of as a matter of "re-Africanizing" the music. Helio Orovio recalls: "Arsenio once said his trumpets played figurations the 'Oriente' tres-guitarists played during the improvisational part of el son" (1992: 11). The "Oriente" is the name given to the eastern end of Cuba, where the son was born. It is common practice for treseros to play a series of guajeo variations during their solos. Perhaps it was only natural then that it was Rodríguez the tres master, who conceived of the idea of layering these variations on top of each other. The following example is from the "diablo" section of Rodríguez's "Kila, Quique y Chocolate" (1950). The excerpt consists of four interlocking guajeos: piano (bottom line), tres (second line), 2nd and 3rd trumpets (third line), and 1st trumpet (fourth line). 2-3 Clave is shown for reference (top line). Notice that the piano plays a single celled (single measure) guajeo, while the other guajeos are two-celled. It is common practice to combine single and double-celled ostinatos in Afro-Cuban music.

During the 1940s, the conjunto instrumentation was in full swing, as were the groups who incorporated the jazz band (or big band) instrumentation in the ensemble, guajeos (vamp-like lines) could be divided among each instrument section, such as saxes and brass; this became even more subdivided, featuring three or more independent riffs for smaller sections within the ensemble. By adopting polyrhythmic elements from the son, the horns took on a vamp-like role similar to the piano montuno and tres (or string) guajeo"—Mauleón (1993: 155).

=== Piano guajeos ===
Arsenio Rodríguez took the pivotal step of replacing the guitar with the piano, which greatly expanded the contrapuntal and harmonic possibilities of Cuban popular music.

"Dile a Catalina," sometimes called "Traigo la yuca," may be Arsenio's most famous composition. The first half uses the changüí/son method of paraphrasing the vocal melody, but the second half strikes out into bold new territory – using contrapuntal material not based on the song's melody and employing a cross‐rhythm based on sequences of three ascending notes—Moore (2011: 39).

With Lilí Martínez as pianist, Arsenio's conjunto recorded numerous songs with complex piano arrangements. For example, the piano guajeo for "Dame un cachito pa' huele" (1946) completely departs from both the generic son guajeo and the song's melody. The pattern marks the clave by accenting the backbeat on the two-side. Moore observes: "Like so many aspects of Arsenio's music, this miniature composition is decades ahead of its time. It would be forty years before groups began to consistently apply this much creative variation at the guajeo level of the arranging process".

"No me llores más" [1948] stands out for its beautiful melodies and the incredible amount emotional intensity it packs into its ultra‐slow 58 bpm groove. The guajeo is based on the vocal melody and marks the clave relentlessly—Moore (2009: 48).

=== Clave-specific bass tumbaos ===
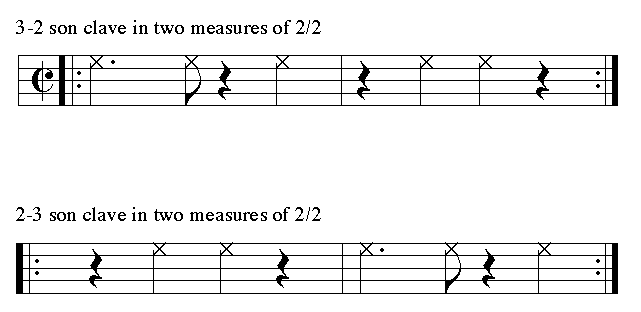
3-2 clave and 2-3 clave written in cut-time

Arsenio Rodríguez brought a strong rhythmic emphasis back into the son. His compositions are clearly based on the key pattern known in Cuba as clave, a Spanish word for 'key' or 'code'.

When clave is written in two measures, as shown above, the measure with three strokes is referred to as the three-side, and the measure with two strokes—the two-side. When the chord progression begins on the three-side, the song, or phrase is said to be in 3-2 clave. When it begins on the two-side, it is in 2-3 clave. The 2-3 bass line of "Dame un cachito pa' huele" (1946) coincides with three of the clave's five strokes. Listen to a midi version of the bass line for "Dame un cachito pa' huele." David García Identifies the accents of "and-of-two" (in cut-time) on the three-side, and the "and-of-four" (in cut-time) on the two-side of the clave, as crucial contributions of Rodríguez's music. The two offbeats are present in the following 2-3 bass line from Rodríguez's "Mi chinita me botó" (1944).

The two offbeats are especially important because they coincide with the two syncopated steps in the son's basic footwork. The conjunto's collective and consistent accentuation of these two important offbeats gave the son montuno texture its unique groove and, hence, played a significant part in the dancer's feeling the music and dancing to it, as Bebo Valdés noted "in contratiempo" ['offbeat timing']—García (2006: 43).

Moore points out that Arsenio Rodríguez's conjunto introduced the two-celled bass tumbaos, that moved beyond the simpler, single-cell tresillo structure. This type of bass line has a specific alignment to clave, and contributes melodically to the composition. Rodríguez's brother Raúl Travieso recounted, Rodríguez insisted that his bass players make the bass "sing." Moore states: "This idea of a bass tumbao with a melodic identity unique to a specific arrangement was critical not only to timba, but also to Motown, rock, funk, and other important genres." Benny Moré (popularly known as El Bárbaro del Ritmo), which further evolved the genre, adding guaracha, bolero and mambo influences, helping make him extraordinarily popular and is now cited as perhaps the greatest Cuban sonero.

== See also ==
- Early son groups
- Montuno
