= Charanga Habanera =

Cuban timba ensemble

La Charanga Habanera is a timba ensemble from Havana directed by David Calzado. The band has been nominated for awards including the Latin Grammy in 2003 for the album Live in the U.S.A. In 2005 Charanga Habanera was nominated for "Orgullosamente Latino" awards in three categories: best video, best album, and best group. Furthermore, the group has won numerous awards from Cubadiscos and Lucas.

== History ==
La Charanga Habanera began in 1988 when a group of young people recently graduated from the art schools in Cuba formed a group to do a project of Cuban music style called charanga, that was popular in the 1940s and 1950s. The project was popular enough that they extended it for five more years. During this time they shared stage with such famous artists as Donna Summer, Stevie Wonder, James Brown, Barry White, Ray Charles, Frank Sinatra, Jerry Lewis, Whitney Houston, and Kool and the Gang, according to Willy Gracial. The group toured internationally in Japan, Mexico, Argentina, Peru and the United States. It is currently one of the most popular timba or Cuban salsa groups in Cuba.

=== 1993-1997 ===
Their first hit, "Me sube la fiebre", had made Charanga Habanera one of Cuba's most popular timba bands. The band had almost no personnel changes outside of the replacement of singer Leo Vera by Michel Maza and the addition of Danny Lozada as a third lead singer. This incarnation of La Charanga produced four historically important timba records. By 1997, La Charanga was banned by the state for its “vulgar” lyrics and risqué stage show.

=== 1997-1998 ===
At the Festival de la Juventud y los Estudiantes in July of 1997, Charanga Habanera performed its R-rated nightclub act on live national television, resulting in a six-month government-imposed suspension. During this time, Dany Lozada and Juan Carlos González departed to form the group which recorded the legendary Tanto le pedí. When the suspension ended the group played until the summer of 1998 without recording and then the more famous breakup occurred, resulting in the formation of Charanga Forever—Kevin Moore (2001: web).

With the departure of González and Lozada, Calzado quickly found replacements and continued rehearsing and developing new material. Sandier Ante replaced Lozada and Roberto "Cucurucho" Carlos replaced González. Eduardo Lazaga left after recording Tremendo delirio and was replaced by Gilberto Moreaux, who had previously played with Bamboleo. This second incarnation of Charanga Habanera never released an album, but did introduce new material, which was eventually recorded by Charanga Forever.

In the summer of 1998 the entire group quit en masse, with two exceptions of singer Michel "El Menor de la Salsa" Maza, and soundman Marcos Morales. Morales stayed with the group for seven years before moving to Miami to be with his family in late 2000.

=== 1998 to 2001 ===
In August 1998, La Charanga Habanera consisted of a lead singer, a musical director, and one soundman. Calzado quickly assembled another successful timba band. Pianist Tirso Duarte was one of Charanga Habanera's most significant members at this time. Duarte recorded original, highly syncopated timba tumbaos (piano guajeos) with tinges of Classical music. Moore recalls testing Duarte's ability to spontaneously create a tumbao based on a Classical piece: “I asked him to play a classical piano piece. He played part of Chopin's “Fantasie Impromptu in C#mi”. I then asked him to improvise on it in a timba style. Within ten minutes he had worked it into a piano tumbao and added a bassline.

On "Charanguero mayor", Duarte references classical piano music, and employs extreme harmonic displacement. The following ten elements are found in Duarte's variants of the "Charanguero mayor" piano tumbao, identifying it as timba: 1. song-specific hook 2. increased length 3. contrasting gestures 4. busy left hand 5. consecutively repeated notes 6. contrary and oblique motion 7. grace note rolls 8. notes clusters and jazz voicings 9. harmonic anticipation and displacement 10. cross-rhythm. Moore: "This tumbao is not only drastically different from the salsa formula—it's also very different from other timba tumbaos, from other timba tumbaos by Tirso, and even from other timba tumbaos in this same song".

The next piano tumbao uses cluster chords. it is also unusual in that Duarte leaves out the F natural from the previous variant. Duarte displays a preference for this type of harmonic tension. He changes chords earlier than anticipated or extends them further. His tumbaos eventually return to a familiar opening phrase and reestablish the harmonic equilibrium.

Yulién Oviedo, a 15-year-old prodigy and son of Calixto Oviedo of NG La Banda, took over on timbales. The Mengual brothers, Orlandito and Lázaro (from Pacho Alonso) took over conga and bongo duties. The young jazz pianist Helder Rojas took over the synthesizer chair. Randolf Chacón (formerly with Bamboleo) became the new bassist. The new horn section consists of Osmani Collado, Yunior Romero (also from Bamboleo), Juan Manuel Jiménez (from Rojitas), and Carmelo "El abuelo" Andrés. Carmelo is the consummate professional trumpeter and had already had a long and successful career with Paulito y su Élite and Rojitas. Michel Maza was joined by Aned Mota and Noel Díaz on vocals. This new incarnation of the group consisted of some of the best young musical talent in Cuba.

== Discography ==
- (1988) Life
- (1991) Cuba
- (1992) Love Fever (Me sube la fiebre)
- (1994) Hey you, Loca!
- (1996) Pa' que se entere La Habana
- (1997) Tremendo delirio
- (2000) El Charanguero Mayor
- (2001) Chan, chan, charanga (Tiene de Cuba tiene de melao)
- (2002) Live in the U.S.A.
- (2003) ¡Marina quiere bailar!
- (2003) Soy cubano, soy popular
- (2004) Buena Onda (bootleg)
- (2004) Charanga light
- (2005) El ciclón de la Habana
- (2007) El rey de Los charangueros
- (2009) No mires la carátula
- (2011) La suerte
- (2013) Charanga light 2
- (2013) Se sufre pero se goza
- (2017) Vivito y coleando
- (2018) Subiendo la parada
