= Issac Delgado =

Cuban musician (born 1962)

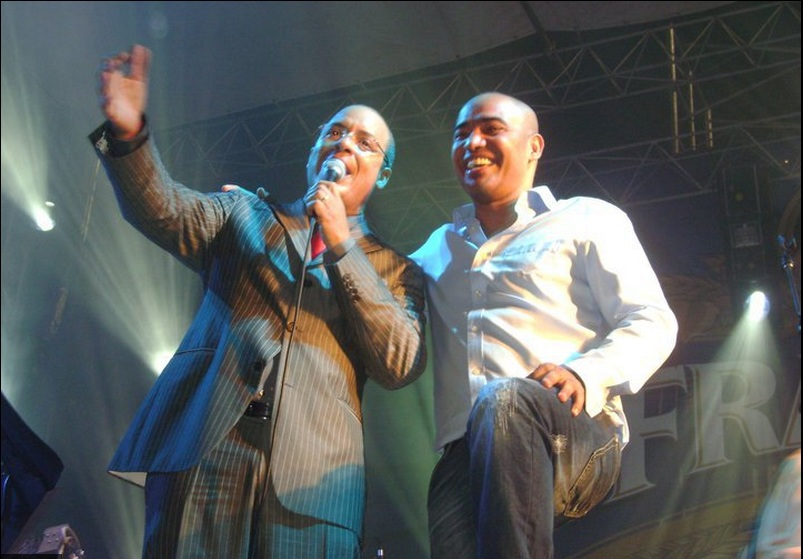
- Born: April 11, 1962 (age 64); Marianao, Havana, Cuba

Issac Delgado (born Isaac Felipe Delgado-Ramirez on April 11, 1962 in Marianao, Habana, Cuba) is one of the founders of the band NG La Banda and is a salsa and timba singer.

== Early life and family ==
His father, Luis Delgado, was a tailor and his mother, Lina Ramirez, was an actress, dancer and singer in the Teatro Musical de La Habana. When he was ten years old he entered the Amadeo Roldan Conservatory where he studied violoncello, an instrument that did not interest him. At twelve he left the conservatory, and pursued the study of sports and football. He later graduated in sport education. At 18, Isaac joined the group "Proyecto" at the request of the pianist, Gonzalo Rubalcaba. He subsequently began studying vocal technique with instructor Mariana De Gonish in Cuba. He also enrolled in the school for professional musicians, "Ignacio Cervantes".

== Professional life ==
Issac Delgado began his professional career in 1983 when he joined Orquesta de Pacho Alonso. He travelled internationally with the orchestra and recorded a CD with them, his first commercial recording. In 1987 he became the vocalist for Galaxia, who also recorded a CD.

=== NG la Banda and the birth of timba ===
In 1988, Delgado became the lead vocalist for the group NG La Banda. NG La Banda is credited with developing timba, described as the first new popular Cuban music genre in decades. As the group's lead vocalist, Delgado became closely associated with the genre. Delgado gained prominence in the timba field, contributing as both a composer and melodic improviser. In concert he often improvises words and melodies for periods of several minutes. He recorded three CDs with NG and was awarded the EGREM prize for 1990–1991.

=== Solo career ===
In 1991 Delgado put together his own band and recorded the CD, Dando La Hora under the artistic direction of Gonzalo Rubalcaba. This album received the 1992 EGREM Prize. His second CD, Con Ganas, again with Rubalcaba, received two EGREM prizes in 1993.

Perhaps inspired by his work with Rubalcaba and the virtuosos of NG La Banda, Delgado has tended to stock his band with the most sophisticated jazz musicians available and to give them an exceptional amount of creative freedom. The result has been a long string of unique and fascinating groups. It's almost easier to list the great Cuban pianists who haven't played in Delgado's band, but here's a partial list of those who have: Tony Pérez, Javier "Caramelo" Massó, Iván "Melón" Lewis, Pepe Rivero, Yaniel "El Majá" Matos, Roberto Carlos "Cucurucho" Valdés, Rolando Luna, Tony Rodríguez and Issacito Delgado

— Moore 2012: 93.

In 1994 he received another EGREM award for his CD El chevere de la salsa y el caballero del son. His next album was El Año Que Viene. He later travelled to the United States to perform in the Festival of Salsa in New York's Madison Square Garden with Celia Cruz, José Alberto "El Canario", and Grupo Niche. In New York he recorded another album, Otra Ideal. In 1997 he performed at the festival, Guerra de la Salsa with La India, Rey Ruiz, and Tony Vega.

At this point in his career, Delgado was recording with both New York salsa musicians and Cuban timba musicians. Some of his recorded material sounds like salsa, but with distinctive timba elements periodically emerging to the surface. Delgado continued to record with timba musicians alongside his salsa work, blending elements of both genres in his post-NG material.

The overall sound of Delgado's recordings from this period sound far more like salsa than timba, However, little details in the arrangements reveal the handiwork of some of Cuba's most important innovators. Delgado's 1994 hit "La Sandunguita" (composed by his bassist Alain Pérez) took unprecedented liberties with clave, that are considered "sacrilegious" to old school musicians (Peñalosa 2012: 246). While such innovations further aggravated the salsa—timba clave schism, "La sandunguita" became a notable example of these rhythmic experiments.

Delgado's most famous group (1996‐1998) was with Alain Pérez on bass and Iván "Melón" Lewis on piano. Of particular note was the band's ability to spontaneously change the arrangement during performances. They were able to produce changes spontaneously by using flexible rhythm section schemes allowing them to alter the form of an arrangement to fit the flow of each performance (Moore 2012: 91). When the entire rhythm section of this band moved to Spain, Delgado added Antonio "Pachá" Portuondo on timbales and Denis "Papacho" Savón on congas. He then convinced drummer Yoel Páez, bassist Joel Domínguez, and pianist Yaniel "El Majá" Matos to leave Paulito FG's band to join him.

The following piano guajeo (or piano tumbao), created by Lewis is from "No me mires a los ojos." It is a prime example of one of the most critical timba piano innovations—the idea that the piano tumbao be a "hook" by which the song can be identified and that contributes greatly to the song's popularity. There are three places where the left hand adds an extra note between two right hand notes, a technique never used before in timba, which has become a major timba piano innovation. Melón was the first to use it as a central part of his style (Moore 2010 pt. 6.). Listen: "No me Mires a los ojos" by Issac Delgado.

Lewis's piano guajeo on Delgado's "La temática" incorporates the technique of pattern displacement. A series of repeated octaves invoke a characteristic metric ambiguity (Moore 2010: pt. 4. 96-108).

In 2006 Delgado went to the U.S. to work on a new album. In May 2007 he released En Primera Plana. He followed up with an album entitled, Así Soy in October 2008. In 2011, Delgado released a maxi-single with La India in four different versions titled, "Que No Se Te Olvide."

Issac latest recording is "Lluvia y Fuego" (2019/Egrem) and features new original classics as well as tributes to Benny Moré and Cheo Feliciano.

== Discography ==
- No te compliques (NG La Banda) (1988)
- En la calle (NG la Banda) (1989)
- No se puede tapar el sol (NG la Banda) (1990)
- Dando la hora (1992)
- Con ganas (1993)
- El chévere de la salsa y el caballero de son (with Adalberto Álvarez) (1994)
- El año que viene (1995)
- Otra idea (1996)
- Exclusivo para cuba (1997)
- La primera noche (1998)
- La fórmula (2000)
- Grandes éxitos
- Versos en el cielo (2002)
- Prohibido (2004)
- En primera plana (2007)
- Así soy (2008)
- L.O.V.E. (2010)
- Supercubano (2011)
- Lluvia Y Fuego (2019)
