= Guajeo =

Arpeggiated melodic motif found in salsa and other Cuban musical genres

A guajeo (Spanish pronunciation: [ɡwaˈxe.o]) is a typical Cuban ostinato melody, most often consisting of arpeggiated chords in syncopated patterns. Some musicians only use the term guajeo for ostinato patterns played specifically by a tres, piano, an instrument of the violin family, or saxophones. Piano guajeos are one of the most recognizable elements of modern-day salsa. Piano guajeos are also known as montunos in North America, or tumbaos in the contemporary Cuban dance music timba.

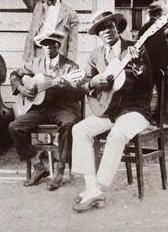
Playing guajeos on guitar and tres in Cuban son music (1925)

== History ==
The guajeo shares rhythmic, melodic and harmonic similarities with the short ostinato figures played on marimbas, lamellophones, and string instruments in sub-Saharan Africa. The guajeo is a seamless blend of African and European musical sensibilities, and was first played as accompaniment on the tres in the Afro-Cuban son and related music. The tres is a Cuban guitar-like instrument, consisting of three sets of double strings.

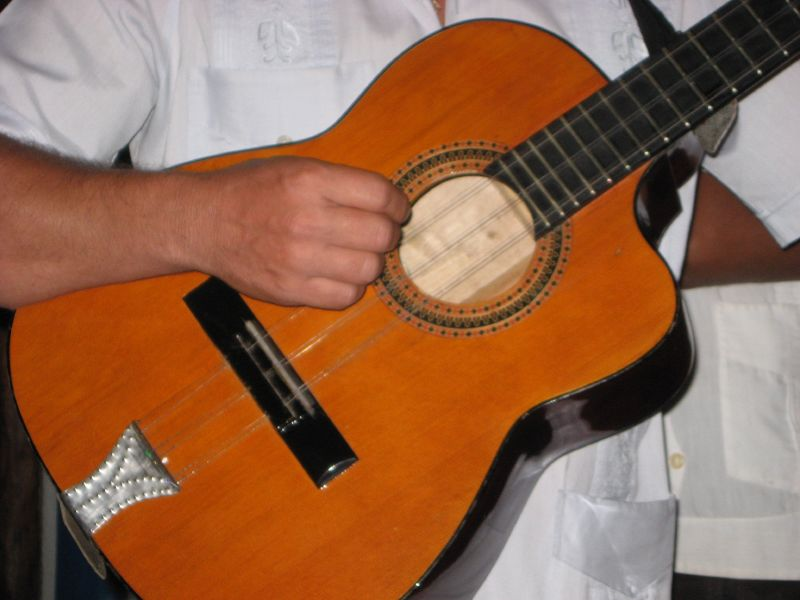
Tres cubano

=== Changüí ===
The guajeo emerged in Cuba during the 19th century, in the genres known as changüí and son. The following changüí tres guajeo consists of all offbeats.

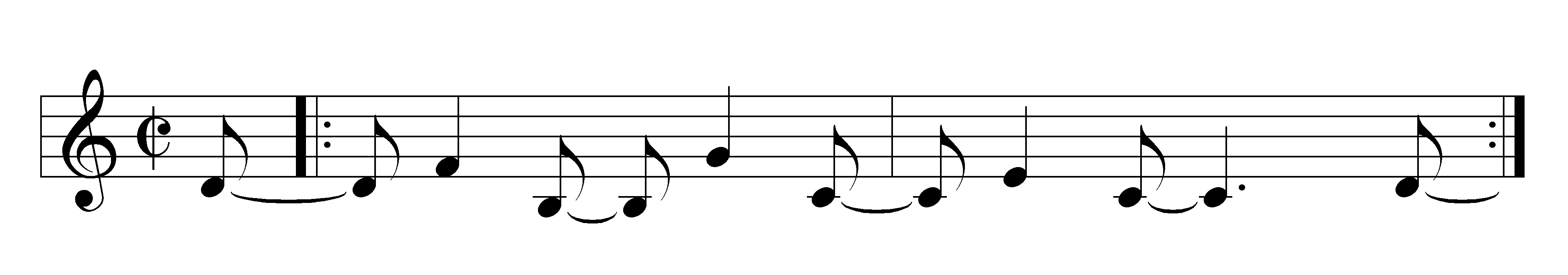
Changüí offbeat guajeo written in cut-time

=== Son ===
There are two types of pure son tres guajeos: generic and song-specific. Song-specific guajeos are usually based on the song's melody, while the generic type involves simply arpeggiating triads—Moore (2010).

The rhythmic pattern of the following "generic" guajeo is used in many different songs. Note that the first measure consists of all offbeats. The figure can begin in the first measure, or the second measure, depending upon the structure of the song.

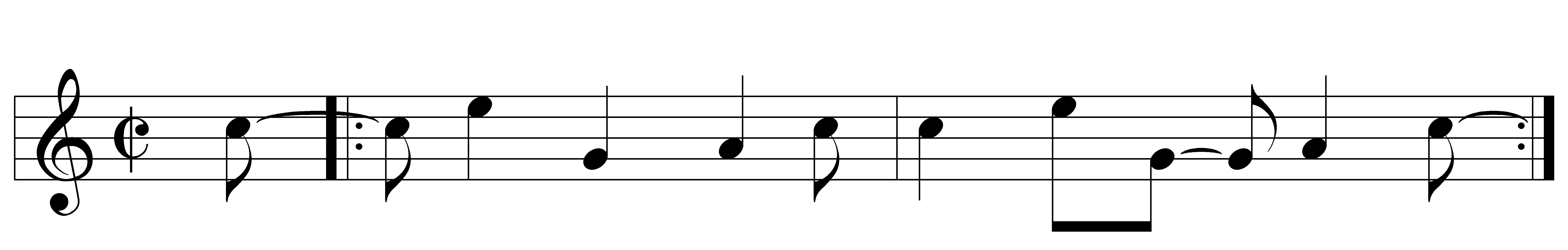
Generic son-based guajeo written in cut-time

=== Son montuno ===
In the late 1930s Arsenio Rodríguez took the pivotal step of replacing the guitar with the piano in the son conjunto. The piano has ever since, been a staple of Cuban popular music, and its "offspring" salsa.

"Como traigo la yuca", popularly called "Dile a Catalina", may be Arsenio's most famous composition. The first half uses the changüí/son method of paraphrasing the vocal melody, but the second half strikes out into bold new territory – using contrapuntal material not based on the song's melody and employing a cross‐rhythm based on sequences of three ascending notes—Moore (2011: 39).

== Clave ==
=== Clave motif ===
==== 3-2 clave ====
Most guajeos have a binary structure, with a specific alignment to the guide pattern known as clave. As Kevin Moore explains: "There are two common ways that the three-side is expressed in Cuban popular music. The first to come into regular use, which David Peñalosa calls 'clave motif,' is based on the decorated version of the three-side of the clave rhythm." The following guajeo example is based on a clave motif. The three-side (first measure) consists of the tresillo variant known as cinquillo. Because the chord progression begins on the three-side, this guajeo is said to be in a three-two clave sequence.

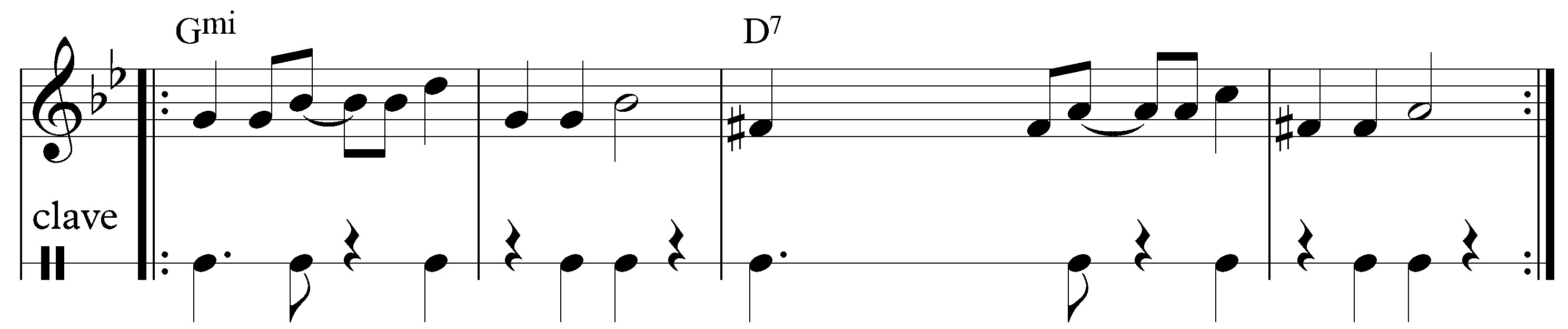
3-2 Piano guajeo: clave motif)

==== 2-3 clave ====
A chord progression can begin on either side of clave. "One" can therefore be on either the three-side, or the two-side, because the harmonic progression, rather than the rhythmic progression is the primary referent. When a chord progression begins on the two-side of clave, the music is said to be in two-three clave. The following guajeo is based on the clave motif in a two-three sequence. The cinquillo rhythm is now in the second measure.

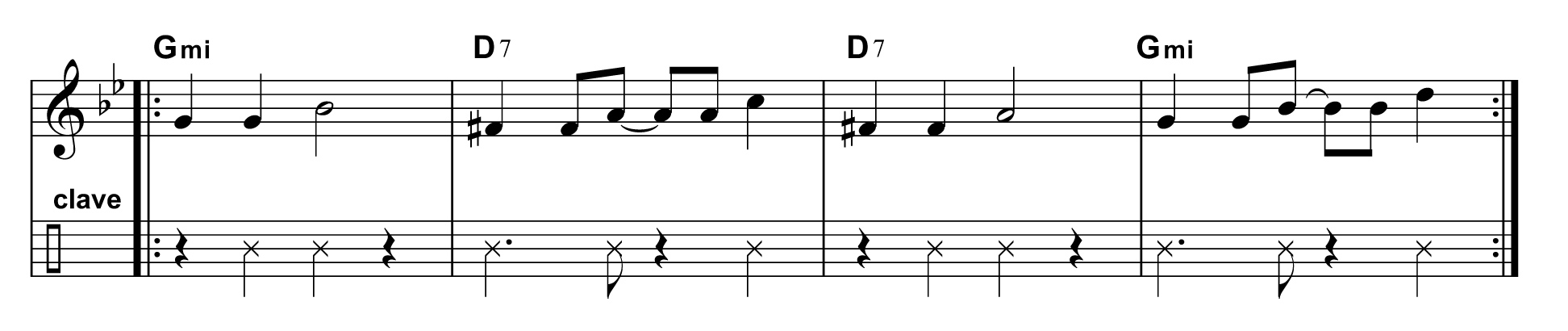
2-3 piano guajeo: clave motif

=== Offbeat/onbeat motif ===
==== 3-2 clave ====
Moore: "By the 1940s [there was] a trend toward the use of what Peñalosa calls the 'offbeat/onbeat motif.' Today, the offbeat/onbeat motif method is much more common." With this type of guajeo motif, the three-side of clave is expressed with all offbeats. The following I IV V IV progression is in a three-two clave sequence. It begins with an offbeat pick-up on the pulse immediately before beat 1. With some guajeos, offbeats at the end of the two-side, or onbeats at the end of the three-side serve as pick-ups leading into the next measure (when clave is written in two measures).

3-2 guajeo: offbeat/onbeat motif

==== 2-3 clave ====
This guajeo is in two-three clave because it begins on the downbeat, emphasizing the onbeat quality of the two-side. The figure has the same exact harmonic sequence as the previous example, but rhythmically, the attack-point sequence of the two measures is reversed. Most salsa music is in two-three clave, and most salsa piano guajeos are based on the two-three onbeat/offbeat motif.

2-3 guajeo: onbeat/offbeat motif

== Ponchando ==
Ponchando is a term for a type of non-arpeggiated guajeo using block chords. The sequence of attack-points is emphasized, rather than a sequence of different pitches. As a form of accompaniment it can be played in a strictly repetitive fashion or as a varied motif akin to jazz comping. Clave is written in two measures.

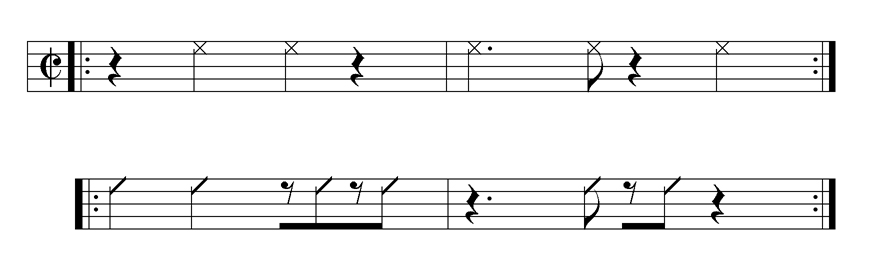
2-3 clave (top) with ponchando figure (bottom).

This ponchando pattern is familiar to many as Santana's "Oye Como Va". Moore states: "Hip fans will often flaunt their knowledge by pointing out that the song was originally recorded by Tito Puente in 1963, and before that by Arcaño y sus Maravillas as "Chanchullo" in 1957, but it goes all the way back to Cachao's "Rareza de Melitón" in 1942.

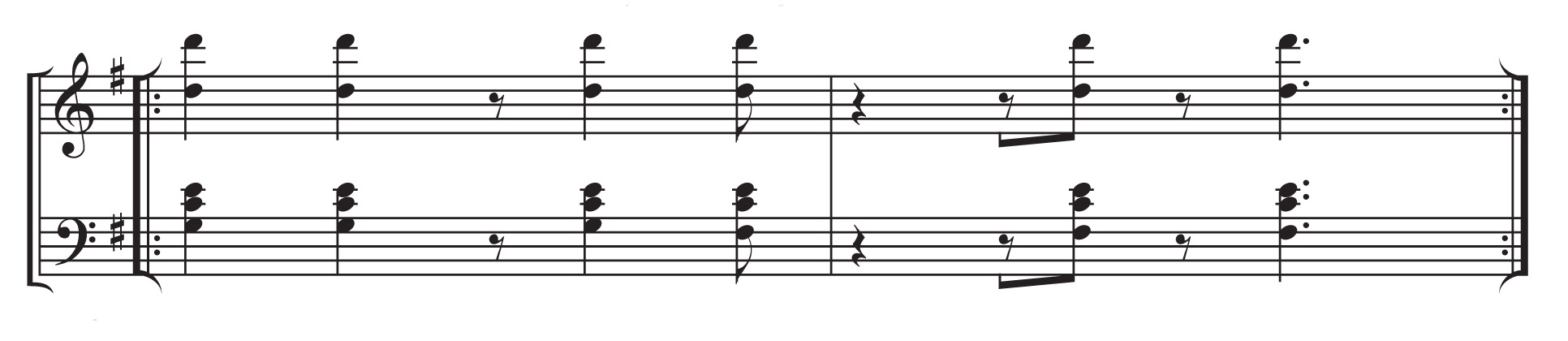
Ponchando figure originally used in "Rareza de Melitón" (1942) by Arcano y Sus Maravillas

== Moñas ==
A moña is a horn guajeo, which can be written or improvised. A section of layered, contrapuntal horn guajeos is also referred to sometimes as a moña. Moñas differ from typical rhythm section guajeos in that they often will rest for a beat or two within their cycle. Those beats within a measure not sounded by the moña are often "filled" by a chorus, or counter moña. What's known as the Cuban típico style of soloing on trombone draws upon the technique of stringing together moña variations. The following example shows five different variants of a 2–3 trombone moña improvised by José Rodrígues on "Bilongo" (c. 1969), performed by Eddie Palmieri. The examples are written in cut-time (2/2); there are two main beats per measure.

Moña 1 sounds every stroke of 2–3 clave except the first stroke of the three-side. Melodic variety is created by transposing the module in accordance to the harmonic sequence, as Rick Davies observes in his detailed analysis of the first moña:

The moña consists of a two-measure module and its repetition, which is altered to reflect the montuno chord progression. The module begins with four ascending eighth-notes starting on the second [quarter-note of the measure]. This configuration emphasizes the ... two-side of the clave. In both of the modules, these four notes move from G3 to Eb4. Although the first, third, and fourth notes (G3, C4, and Eb4) are identical in both modules, the second note reflects the change in harmony. In the first module, this note is the Bb3 third of the tonic harmony; in the module repetition, the A3 is the fifth of the dominant. Of the final five notes in the module, the first four are [offbeats]; the final D4 is on the [last quarter-note] in the second measure of the module. Along with the final D4, the initial D4 on the [last offbeat] in the first measure of the module and the Eb4 on the [offbeat] immediately preceding the final note of the module are identical in both modules. The [offbeats] in the second-module measure reflect the harmonic changes. The first version of the module is over the dominant chord and contains the pitches A3 (the fifth) and C4 (the seventh). A Bb3 is sounded twice on the two [offbeats] in the module's repetition and represents the third G minor tonic chord.

== Piano ==
=== Son montuno ===
When the piano was added to the son conjunto, the harmonic possibilities were widened, facilitating the adaptation of jazz chords into guajeos in the 1940s. As Rebeca Mauleón points out though, the main "role of the pianist in Afro-Cuban music is a more rhythmic one." The piano guajeos of Arsenio Rodríguez's group were innovative for their binary rhythmic structure, reflecting clave. The piano guajeo for "Dame un cachito pa' huele" (1946) completely departs from both the generic son guajeo and the song's melody. The pattern marks the clave by accenting the backbeat on the two-side. Moore observes: "Like so many aspects of Arsenio's music, this miniature composition is decades ahead of its time. It would be forty years before groups began to consistently apply this much creative variation at the guajeo level of the arranging process" (2009: 41).

==== Voicings ====
The typical voicings for piano guajeos is octaves. Sonny Bravo explains:

"You can play it in octaves—single notes in both hands. Or you could double it up. When you're backing a singer, you don't want to get too intense. But when the horns come in on the mambo, you've got to cut through a little more. At that point, I'll double the octave in my right hand, while still playing a single note in the left. To get really intense, I'll play double octaves in both hands."

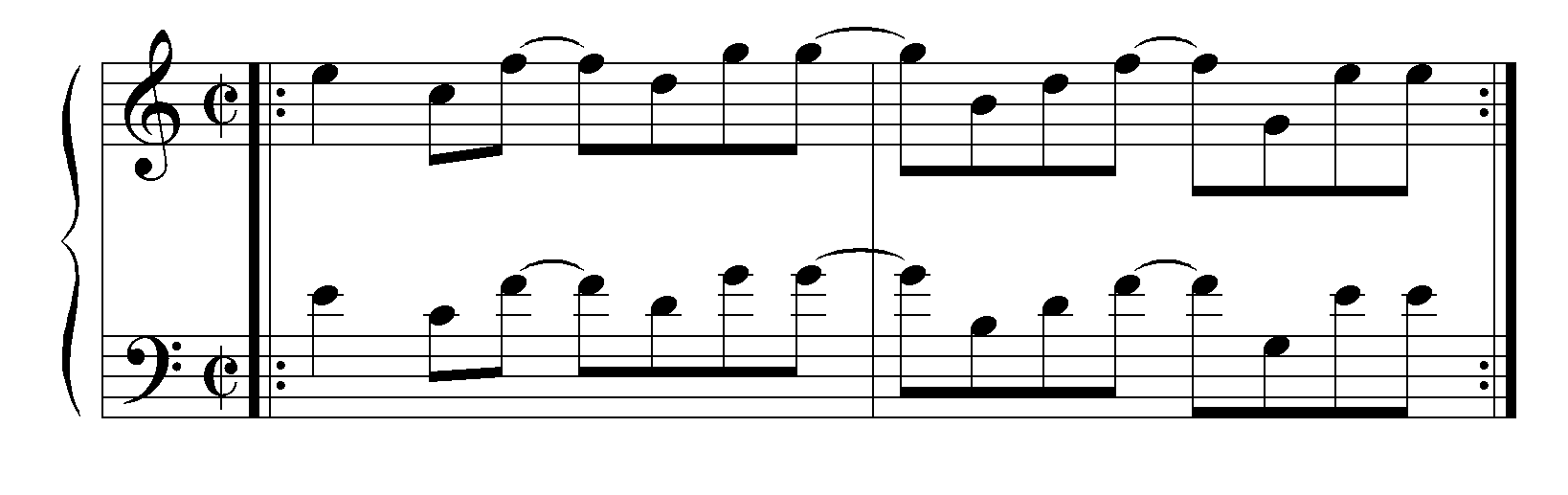
2-3 piano guajeo in octaves.

=== Mambo ===
In the late 1940s Dámaso Pérez Prado popularized the mambo, a genre which had been by that time, evolving for a decade. Pérez Prado moved to Mexico City in 1948 and started his own band, where he composed and recorded his most famous mambos. While in Mexico, Pérez Prado earned the title El Rey del Mambo ('King of the Mambo'), and he appeared in several Mexican films. Pérez Prado's recordings were meant for the Latin American and U.S. Latino markets, but some of his most celebrated mambos, such as "Mambo No. 5" quickly "crossed-over" in the United States. A "mambo craze" swept North America in the 1950s.

=== Descarga ===
The right hand of the "Tanga" piano guajeo is another example of a ponchando pattern. "Tanga" was initially a descarga (Cuban jam session) with jazz solos superimposed, spontaneously composed by Mario Bauzá at a rehearsal (May 29, 1943). Descargas were the "laboratories" where instrumentalists honed their skill of soloing in-clave. "Tanga" was, over time, arranged with more complexity, and is generally considered the first original Latin jazz, or more correctly Afro-Cuban jazz tune. The following example is in the style of a 1949 recording by Machito, with René Hernández on piano.

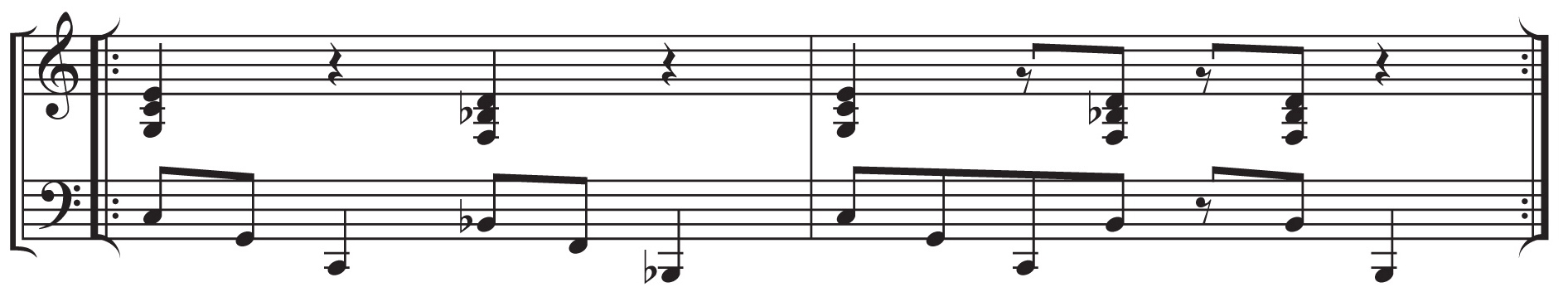
"Tanga" (Mario Bauzá) in the style of Machito and his Afro‐Cubans (recorded 1949).

=== Jazz ===
==== Guajeo motifs ====
Guajeos or guajeo fragments are commonly used motifs in Latin jazz melodies. For example, the A section of "Sabor" is a 2–3 onbeat/offbeat guajeo, minus some notes.

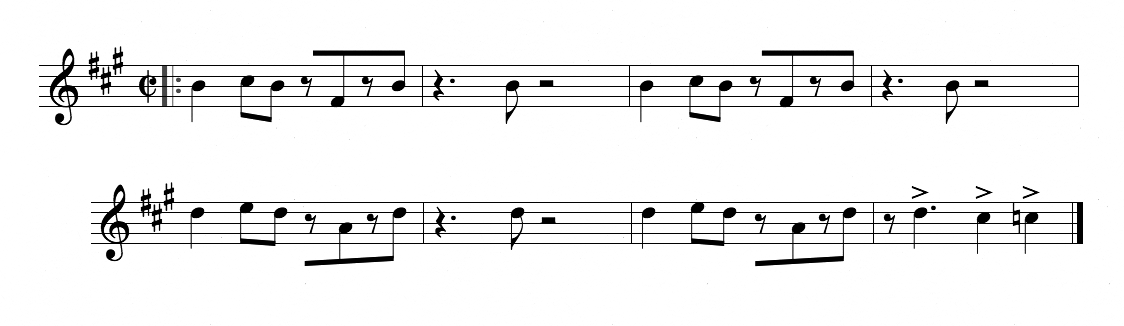
A section of "Sabor" by João Donato, as arranged by Mark Levine, and performed by Cal Tjader.

==== Jazz voicings ====
Just as guajeo patterns entered jazz, jazz harmonies were in turn, adopted into the piano guajeos of dance music. The exchange between Cuban popular music styles and jazz became a two-way street.

From jazz came a harmonic vocabulary based on extended harmonies of altered and unaltered ninths, elevenths and thirteenths, as well as quartal harmony—chords built on fourths. These harmonic devices entered salsa in the piano styles of Eddie Palmieri and the Puerto Rican Papo Lucca. They would take traditional piano figures based on simple tonic-dominant harmony and elaborate them with modern harmonies"—Gerard (1989: 8-9).

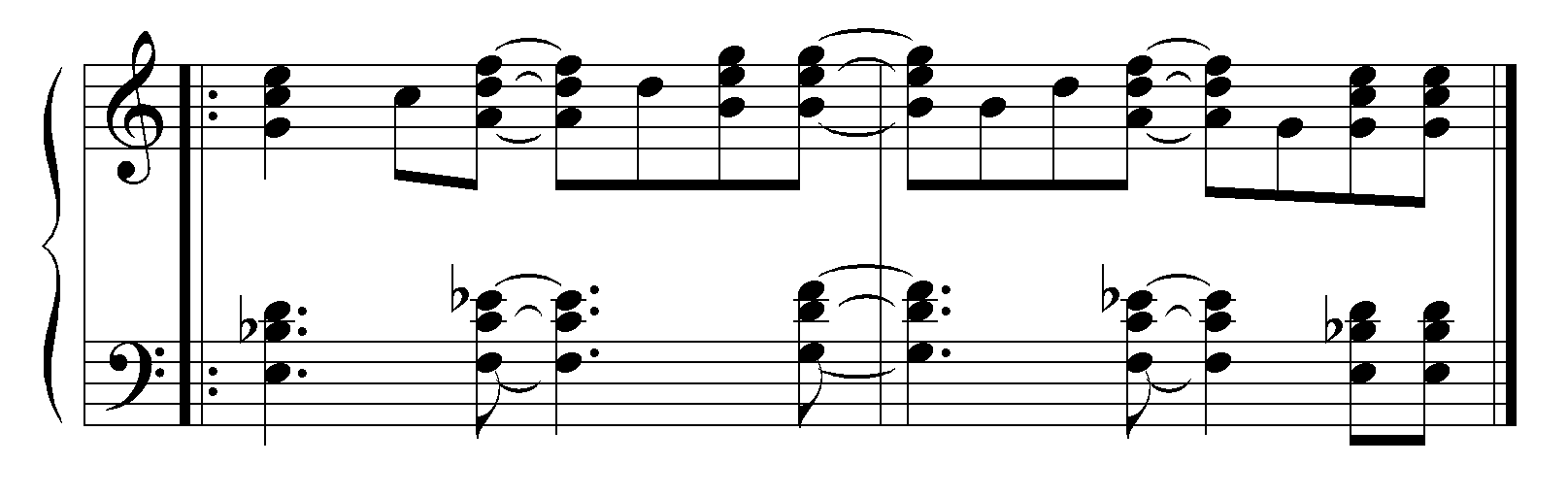
2-3 piano guajeo with jazz voicings.

=== Chachachá ===
The chachachá can be thought of as a rare "de-Africanizing" step in Cuban popular music's trajectory in the mid-20th century because it involves unison singing, instead of call-and-response.

Although the term, dance step, and popular mania of chachachá took hold in 1951, its key musical elements were already in place in Arcaño's group of 1948, including Enrique Jorrín, the violinist‐composer who would later be credited as the "inventor" of the genre. The main idea of chachachá was to extend the montuno section of the danzón and to use melodies with more onbeats to make dancing easier for the rhythmically challenged—Moore (2009: 15).

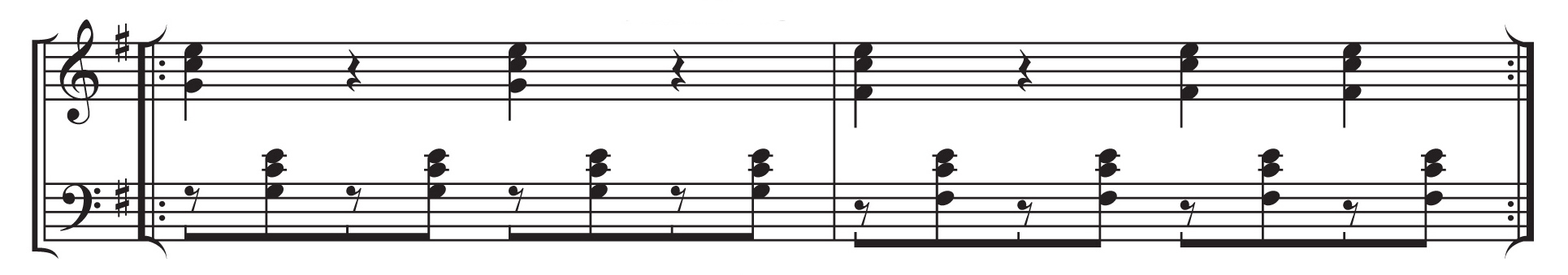
Generic chachachá piano guajeo (c. late 1940s)

=== Mozambique ===
==== Cuban-style ====
Pello el Afrokán's mozambique was the first post‐revolution Cuban popular dance genre (1963). It was the first Cuban popular music to systematically use rumba clave as its guide pattern. Although the rhythm shares many characteristics with Sub-Saharan African music traditions, it does not have anything to do with music from the African nation of Mozambique. The Cuban mozambique features conga drums, bombos (bass drums), cowbells, and trombones. Pello's mozambique "María Caracoles" was recorded by Carlos Santana. In terms of density and the way it marks the clave, the "María Caracoles" guajeo is closer in style to a bass tumbao than to a typical piano guajeo.

==== New York-style ====
In New York City during the 1960s Eddie Palmieri created a rhythm called mozambique that was inspired by Pello's invention of the same name. While both rhythms are based on conga de comparsa, they are in fact, two separate, distinct rhythms that do not share any common parts. Even the clave patterns are different; Pello's rhythm uses rumba clave, while the Palmieri version uses son clave. Pello's mozambiques are, for the most part, in major keys. Palmieri's mozambiques are mostly in minor keys. However, both groups primarily use chord progressions in a 2-3 clave sequence, and a trombone horn section. The following piano guajeo is in the New York mozambique style.

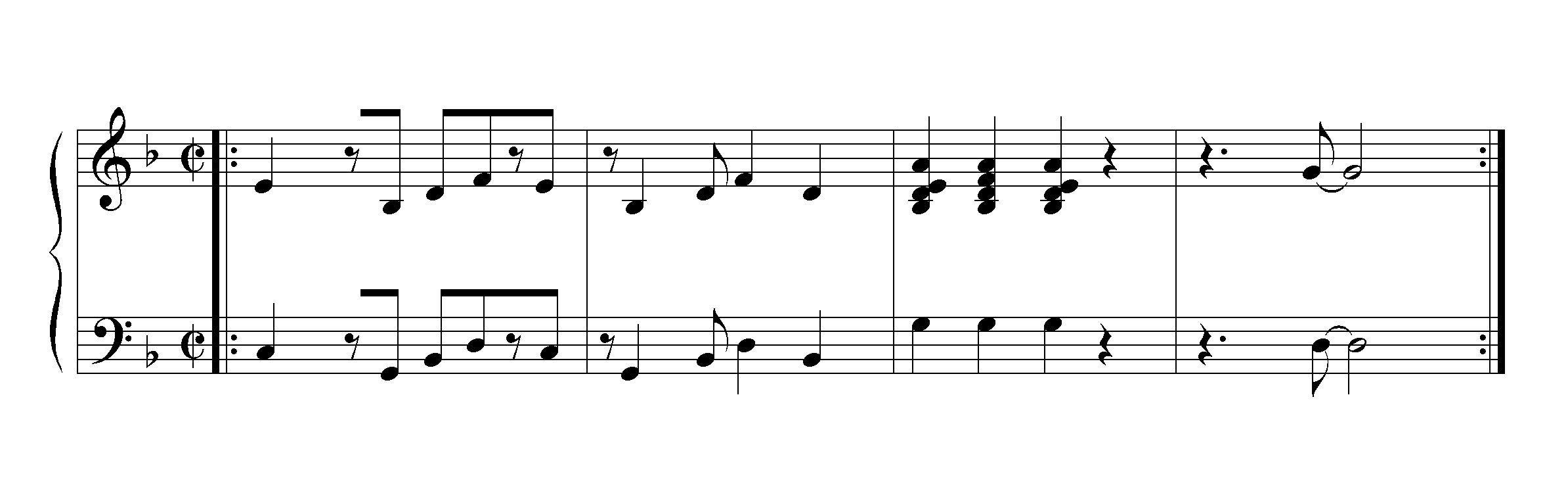
NY-style 2-3 mozambique piano guajeo by Rebeca Mauleón.

Mauleón makes the point that since the Cuban mozambique originally began in what was essentially a percussion ensemble with trombones, there is no set piano part for the rhythm. It is worth noting that while Pello created specific percussion parts for his mozambique, the only specific percussion part in the New York style is the bell pattern.

=== Pilón ===
Enrique Bonne [was] a timbalero, prolific songwriter and creator of various rhythms such as pilón, simalé and upa upa. As the leader of Enrique Bonne y sus Tambores, he was also a pioneer in bringing Afro‐Cuban folkloric influences into popular music. Of the many rhythms that Bonne created or popularized for Pacho's band, the most important was pilón. It started as a dance craze, with the dancers mimicking the movement of stirring a vat of roasting coffee beans, but long after the dance had been relegated to the history of pop culture, the rhythm itself continued to influence the likes of José Luis "Changuito" Quintana of Los Van Van, Orlando Mengual of Charanga Habanera, Denis "Papacho" Savón of Issac Delgado, Tomás "El Panga" Ramos of Paulito FG and Cubanismo, and many Latin Jazz musicians—Moore.

One unique aspect of the pilón is the use of simultaneous piano and electric guitar guajeos. Rhythmically, the guitar plays a much simpler form of the piano part. The following example is written in 4/4 rather than cut-time.

=== Changüí '68 ===
The genre known as changüí '68 has everything to do with 1968 and almost nothing to do with the authentic traditional changüí. Elio Revé was from Guantánamo and used the term "changüí" to distinguish his band from other charangas of the 1950s. In 1968 the band departed almost entirely from traditional charanga when Revé hired Juan Formell to be his new bassist, composer and musical director. Formell had been surreptitiously listening to forbidden North American and British pop music and used his new influences to create several hits in a new shockingly un-Cuban style. Changüí '68 . . . was less important for what it wasn't than for what it was. It didn't use interlocking cowbells; it often didn't use normal Cuban dance tempos, and most importantly, it didn't use traditional Latin chord progressions. Changüí '68 broke so many established rules that subsequent genres, including Formell's own songo, were free to reassemble the stylistic elements as they saw fit. While the rhythms of the interlocking [guajeos] of [the following example] might well be found in 1950s charanga, the modal chord progression would not have been found in any music of the 1950s, Cuban or otherwise. The harmonies are directly inspired by late‐60s rock, . . . represented a drastic rethinking of harmony in pop music—Moore (2010: 13,14).

=== Songo ===
Juan Formell's initial songo experiments in Los Van Van used piano guajeos with an on-beat feel, as a way of simulating rock. On "Con el bate de aluminio" (1979), the right hand plays steady onbeats, sounding a rock‐influenced imi – bVII – bVI chord progression.

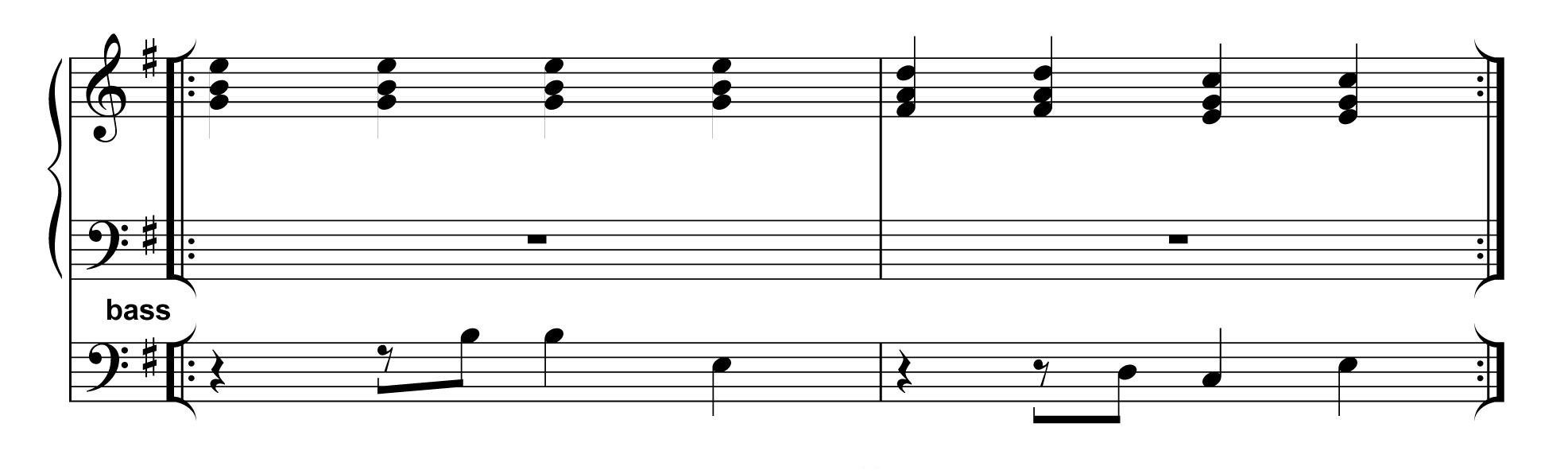
"Con el bate de aluminio" (1979).

=== Timba ===
The Cuban jazz pianist Gonzalo Rubalcaba developed a technique of pattern and harmonic displacement in the 1980s, which was adopted into timba guajeos in the 1990s. The following guajeo for Issac Delgado's "La temática" (1997) demonstrates some of the innovations of timba piano. A series of repeated octaves invoke a characteristic metric ambiguity.

The following guajeo (or piano tumbao), created by Iván "Melón" Lewis is from "No me mires a los ojos" (Issac Delgado 1995). It is a prime example of one of the most critical timba piano innovations—the idea that the piano tumbao be a “hook” by which the song can be identified and that contributes greatly to the song's popularity. There are three places where the left hand adds an extra note between two right hand notes, a technique never used before in timba, which has become a major timba piano innovation. Melón was the first to use it as a central part of his style.

Lewis's piano guajeo on Delgado's "La temática" incorporates the technique of pattern displacement. A series of repeated octaves invoke a characteristic metric ambiguity (Moore 2010: pt. 4. 96–108).

== Layered guajeos ==
=== Diablo ===
Arsenio Rodríguez introduced the idea of layered guajeos—an interlocking structure consisting of multiple contrapuntal parts. The concept, which he began developing in his conjunto in 1934, reached full maturity in 1938. This aspect of the son's modernization can be thought of as a matter of "re-Africanizing" the music. Helio Orovio recalls: "Arsenio once said his trumpets played figurations the 'Oriente' tres-guitarists played during the improvisational part of el son" (1992: 11). The "Oriente" is the name given to the eastern end of Cuba, where the son was born. It is common practice for treseros to play a series of guajeo variations during their solos. Perhaps it was only natural then that it was Rodríguez the tres master, who conceived of the idea of layering these variations on top of each other. The following example is from the "diablo" section of Rodríguez's son montuno "Kile, Kike y Chocolate" (1950). The excerpt consists of four interlocking guajeos: piano (bottom line), tres (second line), 2nd and 3rd trumpets (third line), and 1st trumpet (fourth line). 2-3 Clave is shown for reference (top line). Notice that the piano plays a single celled (single measure) guajeo, while the other guajeos are two-celled. It is common practice to combine single and double-celled guajeos in Afro-Cuban music.

During the 1940s, the conjunto instrumentation was in full swing, as were the groups who incorporated the jazz band (or big band) instrumentation in the ensemble, guajeos (vamp-like lines) could be divided among each instrument section, such as saxes and brass; this became even more subdivided, featuring three or more independent riffs for smaller sections within the ensemble. By adopting polyrhythmic elements from the son, the horns took on a vamp-like role similar to the piano montuno and tres (or string) guajeo"—Mauleón (1993: 155).

=== Chachachá ===
Orquesta Aragón creatively juxtaposed a counter violin guajeo over the piano on "No me molesto" (1955). Here is another example of guajeo counterpoint (1957). The violins echo the E – F – F# piano figure. The bass plays a chachachá figure that would be used extensively in timba during the 1990s.

=== Moñas ===
One very effective technique used in mambos and descargas is the use of layered, varying moñas. The trumpet and trombone moñas shown below ("Bilongo") can be repeated verbatim, or altered. Improvisation is within a framework of repetition and the melodic contour of the moñas. In this way, multiple instrumentalists can improvise simultaneously while reinforcing the rhythmic/melodic momentum of the rhythm section.

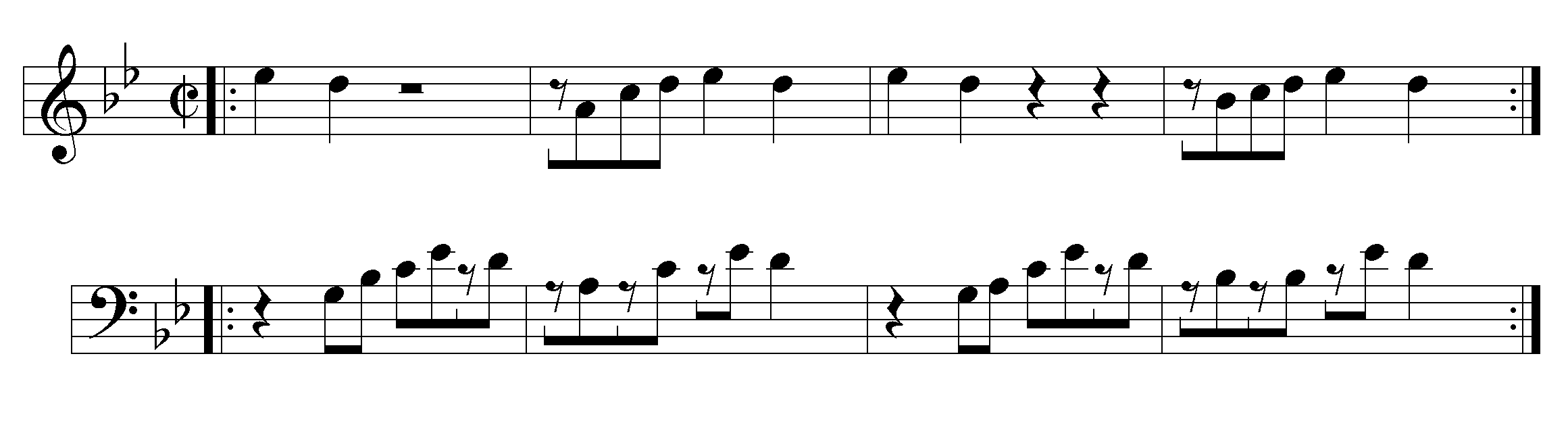
2-3 trumpet and trombone moñas, "Bilongo" (c. 1969) Top: trumpet; bottom: trombone.

The next moña layers are from the descarga "Guatacando" (1968). The trumpet figure is one clave in length, while the trombone figure is two claves. This is a classic example of how moñas are layered. The trombone Moña consists of two parts, a call-and-response structure. The trumpet moña begins on the last note of first half of the trombone moña. The second half of the trombone moña begins on the pulse (subdivision) immediately following the last note of the trumpet moña.

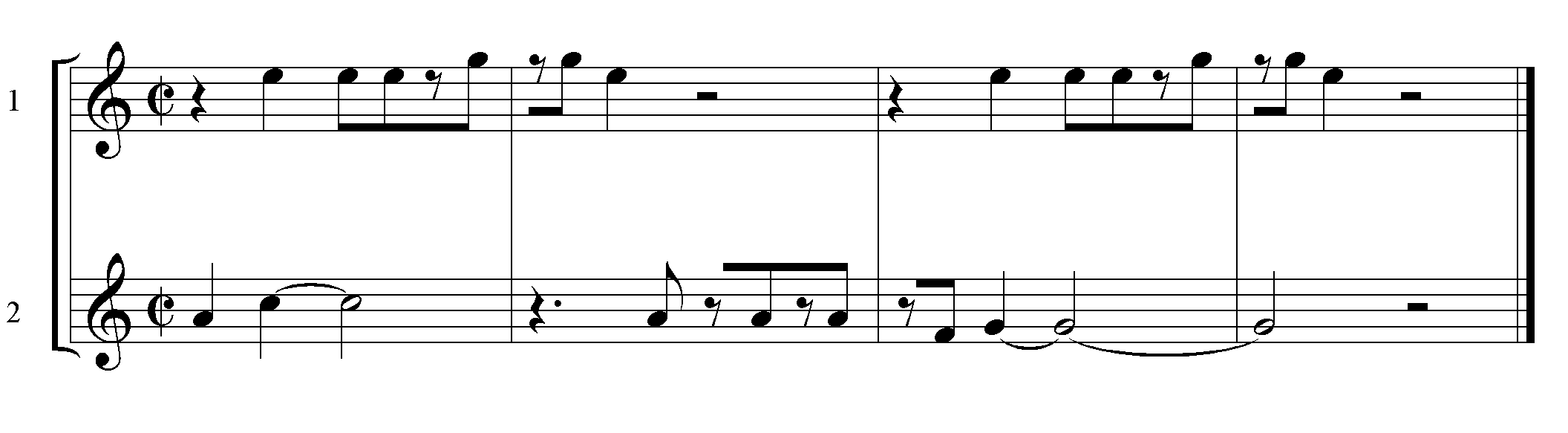
2-3 trumpet and trombone moñas, "Guatacando" (1968). 1. trumpets; 2. trombones.

=== Songo ===
"Fallaste al sacar" (1982) by Los Van Van is an example of creative guajeo counterpoint. Moore states: "Pupy's arrangement pushes the envelope ... by expanding the violin part from the usual sparse rhythmic loop to a long and constantly varying melody, pitted against an almost equally inventive piano [guajeo]. The violin part is active and creative enough to stand alone as a mambo section, but it is used as the underpinning for an equally complex and interesting coro. The violin part could also be nicely adapted for use in a 1990s‐style timba piano [guajeo]." On Los Van Van v. 6 (1980) Juan Formell took the unusual step of adding trombones to his charanga format. Orquesta Revé did the same during the time. "Tú tranquilo" has four interlocking guajeos: two keyboards, violins, and trombones.

=== Timba ===
Many timba bands use two keyboards. The following example shows two simultaneous guajeo parts for Issac Delgado's "Por qué paró" (1995), as played by Melón Lewis (1st keyboard), and Pepe Rivero (2nd keyboard).

== R&B, funk, and rock ==
New Orleans has a long history of absorbing Afro-Cuban musical influences, going back at least to the mid-19th century. The Cuban influence was exceptionally strong in the Crescent City during the late 1940s and early 1950s, when rhythm & blues (R&B) was first forming. The unique style of R&B that emerged from New Orleans during this period played a pivotal role in the development of funk and the rock guitar riff.

=== Professor Longhair ===
In the 1940s New Orleans pianist "Professor Longhair" (Henry Roeland Byrd) was playing with Caribbean musicians, listening a lot to Perez Prado's mambo records, and absorbing and experimenting with it all. He was especially enamored with Cuban music. Michael Campbell states: "Rhythm and blues influenced by Afro-Cuban music first surfaced in New Orleans. Professor Longhair's influence was ... far reaching. Longhair's style was known locally as rumba-boogie. Alexander Stewart states that Longhair was a key figure bridging the worlds of boogie woogie and the new style of rhythm and blues." In his composition "Misery", Longhair plays a habanera-like figure in his left hand. The deft use of triplets in the right hand is a characteristic of Longhair's style.

Tresillo, the habanera, and related African-based single-celled figures have long been heard in the left hand part of piano compositions by New Orleans musicians, for example—Louis Moreau Gottschalk ("Souvenirs From Havana" 1859), and Jelly Roll Morton ("The Crave" 1910). One of Longhair's great contributions was the adaptation of two-celled, clave-based patterns in New Orleans blues. Campbell: "In several of his early recordings, Professor Longhair blended Afro-Cuban rhythms with rhythm and blues. The most explicit is "Longhair's Blues Rhumba", where he overlays a straightforward blues with a clave rhythm. According to Dr. John (Malcolm John "Mac" Rebennack, Jr.), the Professor "put funk into music ... Longhair's thing had a direct bearing I'd say on a large portion of the funk music that evolved in New Orleans." The guajeo-like piano part for the Professor Longhair rumba-boogie "Mardi Gras in New Orleans" (1949), employs the 2–3 clave onbeat/offbeat motif. 2-3 clave is written above the piano excerpt for reference.

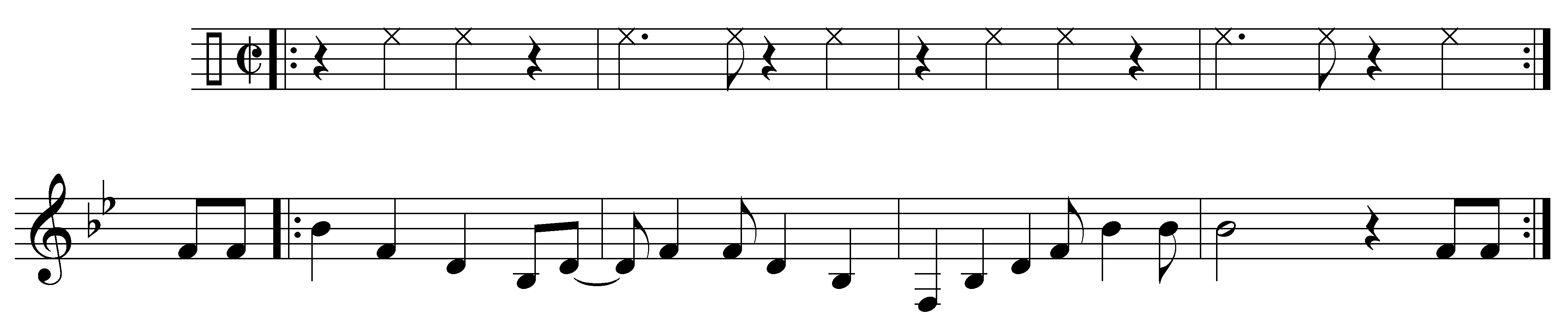
Piano excerpt from the rumba boogie "Mardi Gras in New Orleans" (1949) by Professor Longhair. 2-3 clave is written above for rhythmic reference.

=== Johnny Otis ===
Johnny Otis released the R&B mambo "Mambo Boogie" in January 1951, featuring congas, maracas, claves, and mambo saxophone guajeos in a blues progression.

This is a syncopated, but straight subdivision feel of Cuban music (as opposed to swung subdivisions). Alexander Stewart states that this popular feel was passed along from "New Orleans—through James Brown's music, to the popular music of the 1970s," adding: "The singular style of rhythm & blues that emerged from New Orleans in the years after World War II played an important role in the development of funk. In a related development, the underlying rhythms of American popular music underwent a basic, yet generally unacknowledged transition from triplet or shuffle feel to even or straight eighth notes. Concerning funk motifs, Stewart states: "This model, it should be noted, is different from a time line (such as clave and tresillo) in that it is not an exact pattern, but more of a loose organizing principle."

=== James Brown ===
The onbeat/offbeat motif is the basis for a great deal of funk music. Blues scales give these rhythmic figures their own distinct quality. The main guitar riff for James Brown's "Bring It Up" is an example of an onbeat/offbeat motif. Rhythmically, the pattern is similar to the typical Cuban guajeo structure, but tonally, it is unmistakably funky. Bongos are used on the 1967 version. The rhythm is slightly swung.

"Ain't It Funky Now" has a 2–3 guitar riff (c. late 1960s).

"Give It Up or Turnit a Loose" (1969) has a similarly funky 2–3 structure. The tonal structure has a bare bones simplicity, emphasizing the pattern of attack-points.

=== Beatles ===
The onbeat/offbeat motif has been a part of rock 'n' roll since the inception of that genre. The guitar riff of the Beatles' "I Feel Fine" is built on the onbeat/offbeat motif. It fits perfectly with 2–3 clave.

Today, the 2–3 onbeat/offbeat motif is a staple of North American popular music, even popular music worldwide. It is a motif that originated in sub-Saharan Africa, arrived in the United States in the form of Afro-Cuban music, was absorbed, and reconstituted, then spread globally in the form of rock 'n' roll.

== African electric guitar: reinterpreting Afro-Cuban guajeos ==
Cuban music has been popular in sub-Saharan Africa since the mid 20th century. To the Africans, clave-based Cuban popular music sounded both familiar and exotic. The Encyclopedia of Africa v. 1. states:

"Beginning in the 1940s, Afro-Cuban [son] groups such as Septeto Habanero and Trio Matamoros gained widespread popularity in the Congo region as a result of airplay over Radio Congo Belge, a powerful radio station based in Léopoldville (now Kinshasa DRC). A proliferation of music clubs, recording studios, and concert appearances of Cuban bands in Léopoldville spurred on the Cuban music trend during the late 1940s and 1950s."

Banning Eyre distills down the Congolese guitar style to this skeletal figure, where clave is sounded by the bass notes (notated with downward stems).

=== Congolese "rumba" ===
Congolese bands started doing Cuban covers and singing the lyrics phonetically. Eventually they created their own original Cuban-like compositions, with lyrics sung in French or Lingala, a lingua franca of the western Congo region. The Africans adapted guajeos to electric guitars, and gave them their own regional flavor. The Congolese called this new music rumba, although it was really based on the son.

The following example is from the Congolese "rumba" "Passi ya boloko" by Franco (Luambo Makiadi) and O.K. Jazz (c. mid-1950s). The bass is playing a tresillo-based tumbao, typical of son montuno. The rhythm guitar plays all of the offbeats, the exact pattern of the rhythm guitar in Cuban son. According to the Garland Encyclopedia of World Music, the lead guitar part "recalls the blue-tinged guitar solos heard in bluegrass and rockabilly music of the 1950s, with its characteristic insistence on the opposition of the major-third and minor-third degrees of the scale."

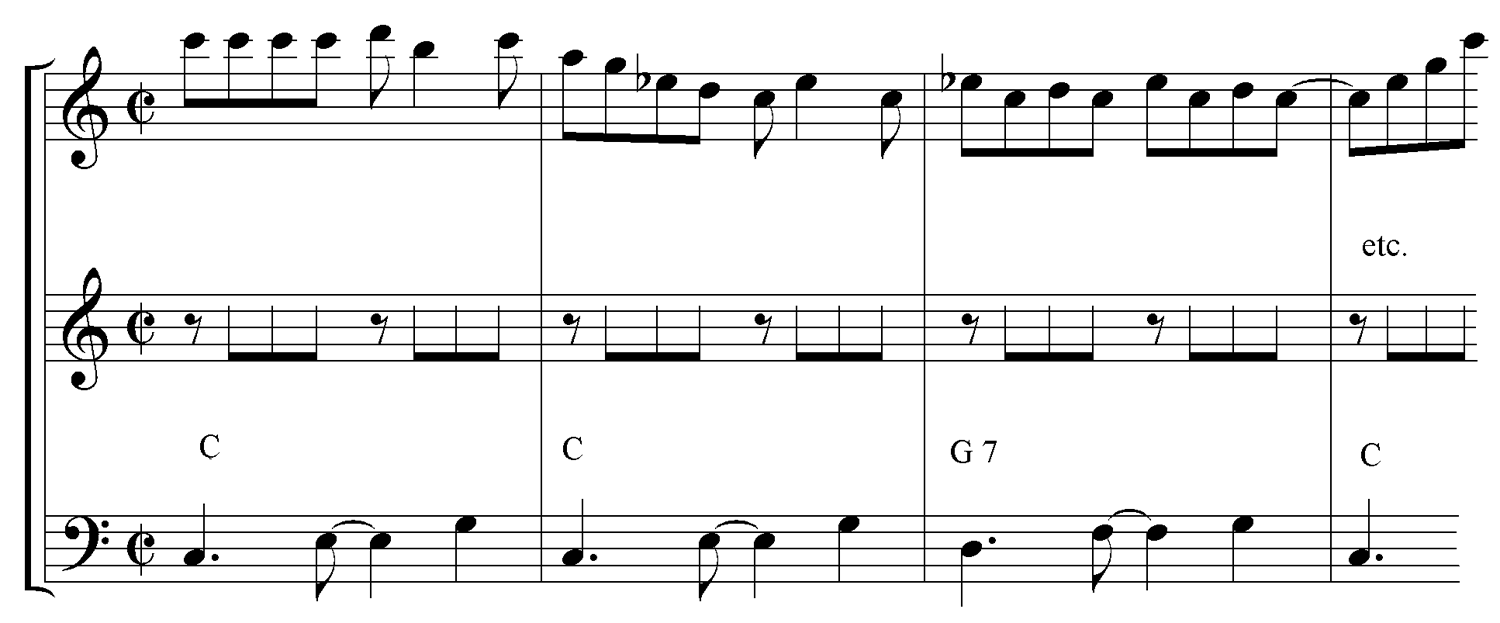
"Passi ya boloko" by Franco (c. mid-1950s). From top: lead guitar; rhythm guitar; bass guitar.

=== Congolese soukous ===
The guitar-based music gradually spread out from the Congo, increasingly taking on local sensibilities. This process eventually resulted in the establishment of several different distinct regional genres, such as soukous. Some African guitar genres such as Zimbabwean chimurenga (created by Thomas Mapfumo), are a direct adaptation of traditional ostinatos, in this case mbira music. Most genres though, maintain to some degree, a guajeo template upon which indigenous elements were grafted. Congolese soukous is an example of the latter case. The horn guajeos of Cuban popular music were adapted by soukous guitars. In a densely textured seben section of a soukous song (below), the three interlocking guitar parts are reminiscent of the Cuban practice of layering guajeos.

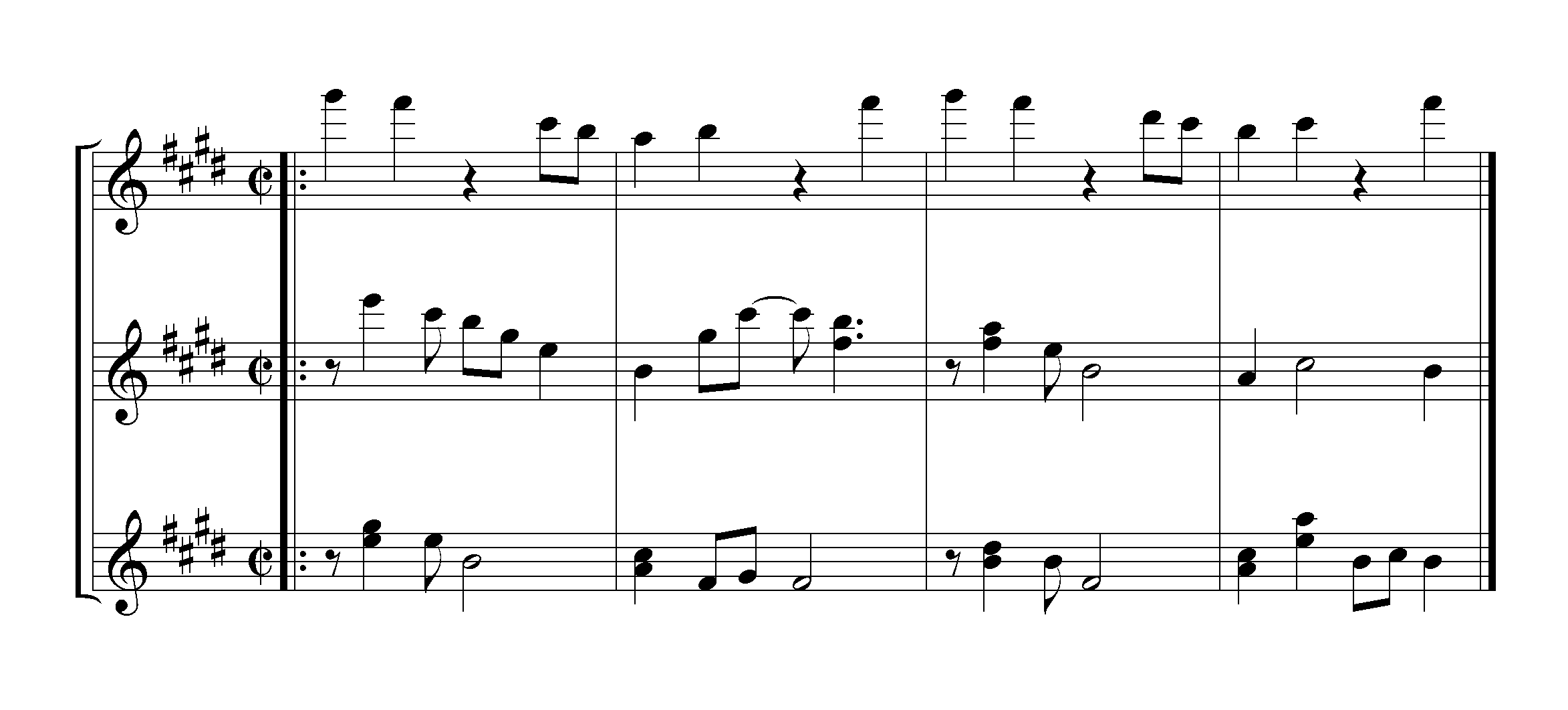
Seben section of a soukous song. From top: solo guitar; mi-solo guitar; accompaniment guitar.

=== Ghanaian and Nigerian highlife ===
Highlife was the most popular genre in Ghana and Nigeria during the 1960s. This arpeggiated highlife guitar part is essentially a guajeo. The rhythmic pattern is known in Cuba as baqueteo. The pattern of attack-points is nearly identical to the 3-2 clave motif guajeo shown earlier in this article. The bell pattern known in Cuba as clave, is indigenous to Ghana and Nigeria, and is used in highlife.

Top: clave. Bottom highlife guitar part

=== Nigerian afrobeat ===
Afrobeat is a combination of traditional Yoruba music, highlife, jazz, and funk, popularised in Africa in the 1970s. The Nigerian multi-instrumentalist and bandleader Fela Kuti, who gave it its name, used it to revolutionise musical structure as well as the political context in his native Nigeria. Kuti coined the term "afrobeat" upon his return from a U.S. tour with his group Nigeria '70 (formerly Koola Lobitos).

The following afrobeat guitar part is a variant of the 2-3 onbeat/offbeat motif. Even the melodic contour is guajeo-based. 2-3 clave is shown above the guitar for reference only. The clave pattern is not ordinarily played in afrobeat.

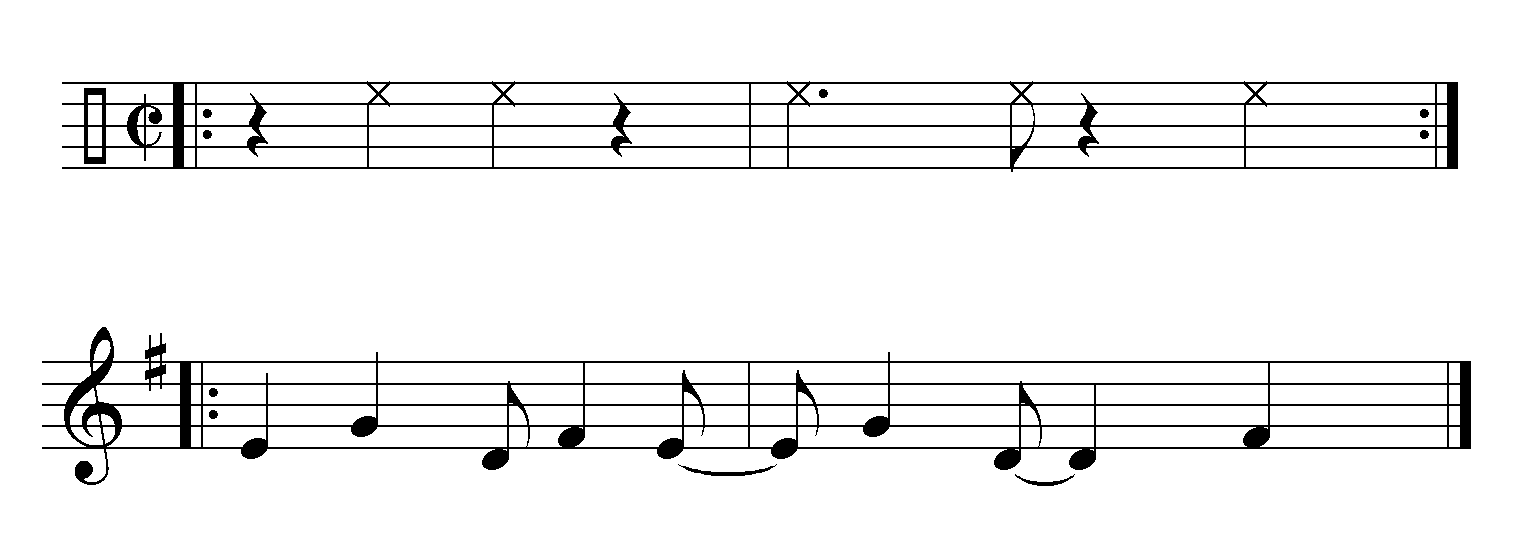
Top: 2-3 clave. Bottom: afrobeat guitar part

Cuban popular music played a major role in the development of many contemporary genres of African popular music. John Storm Roberts states: "It was the Cuban connection ... that provided the major and enduring influences—the ones that went deeper than earlier imitation or passing fashion. The Cuban connection began very early and was to last at least twenty years, being gradually absorbed and re-Africanized." The re-working of Afro-Cuban rhythmic patterns by Africans brings the rhythms full circle.

The re-working of the harmonic patterns reveals a striking difference in perception. The I IV V IV harmonic progression, so common in Cuban music, is heard in pop music all across the African continent, thanks to the influence of Cuban music. Those chords move in accordance with the basic tenets of Western music theory. However, as Gerhard Kubik points out, performers of African popular music do not necessarily perceive these progressions in the same way: "The harmonic cycle of C-F-G-F [I-IV-V-IV] prominent in Congo/Zaire popular music simply cannot be defined as a progression from tonic to subdominant to dominant and back to subdominant (on which it ends) because in the performer's appreciation they are of equal status, and not in any hierarchical order as in Western music."
