= Bilal =

Bilal may refer to:

== People ==
- Bilal (name), or Belal or Bilel, including a list of people with the name
- Bilal ibn Rabah, a companion of Muhammad, made calls for prayers
- Bilal (American singer)
- Bilal (Lebanese singer)

== Places ==
- Bilal Colony, a neighbourhood of Korangi Town in Karachi, Sindh, Pakistan
- Bilal Town, a suburb of Abbottabad, Pakistan where Osama bin Laden was killed

== Other uses ==
- Bilal: A New Breed of Hero, a 2015 animated film
- 23166 Bilal, main belt asteroid
- Bilal Muslim Mission, international Shi'a twelver organization
- Bilal Xhaferi Publishing House, Albanian publishing house

== See also ==
- Bilali, usually a surname
