= BBC Radio 3 Awards for World Music =

Former award category

- Awarded for: World music
- Sponsored by: BBC Radio 3
- Venue: Various
- Country: United Kingdom
- First award: 2003; 23 years ago
- Final award: 2008; 18 years ago

Television/radio coverage
- Network: BBC Radio 3

The BBC Radio 3 Awards for World Music was an award given to world music artists between 2002 and 2008, sponsored by BBC Radio 3. The award was thought up by fRoots magazine's editor Ian Anderson, inspired by the BBC Radio 2 Folk Awards. Until 2006, the awards panel was chaired by Charlie Gillett and the awards shows co-ordinated by Alex Webb.

== Categories ==
Award categories included: Africa, Asia/Pacific, Americas, Europe, Mid East and North Africa, Newcomer, Culture Crossing, Club Global, Album of the Year, and Audience Award. Initial lists of nominees in each category were selected annually by a panel of several thousand industry experts. Shortlisted nominees were voted on by a twelve-member jury, which selected the winners in every category except for the Audience Award category. These jury members were appointed and presided over by the BBC.

== Award ceremonies ==
The annual awards ceremony was held at various venues including the Ocean in Hackney, Sage in Gateshead, the Usher Hall in Edinburgh, the Brixton Academy and finally at the BBC Proms. Winners were given an award called a "Planet," designed by Croatian sculptor Anita Sulimanovic in 2003.

In March 2009, the BBC made a decision to axe the BBC Radio 3 Awards for World Music.

=== 2003 winners ===
The Awards concert took place on 24 March 2003. The award recipients were as follows:

Africa
Winner: Orchestra Baobab
Runners-up: Bembeya Jazz, Kassé Mady Diabaté, Tony Allen
Asia/Pacific
Winner: Mahwash & Ensemble Kaboul
Runners-up: Te Vaka, Trilok Gurtu, Alka Yagnik

Americas
Winner: Los de Abajo
Runners-up: Susana Baca, Yusa, Lila Downs

Europe
Winner: Mariza
Runners-up: Ojos de Brujo, Kimmo Pohjonen, Sergey Starostin

Middle East and North Africa
Winner: Samira Said.
Runners-up: Kayhan Kalhor, Omar Faruk Tekbilek, Yair Dalal

Newcomer
Winner: Gotan Project
Runners-up: DuOuD, Mariza, Yusa

Boundary Crossing
Winner: Ellika & Solo
Runners-up: Papa Noël & Papi Oviedo, Oi Va Voi, Gotan Project

Critics Award
Winner: Orchestra Baobab
Runners-up: Eliza Carthy, Salif Keita, Youssou N'Dour

Sources: 2003 nominees and winners

=== 2004 winners ===
Africa
Winner: Daara J
Runners-up: Cesária Évora, Oumou Sangaré, Rokia Traoré

Asia/Pacific
Winner: Sevara Nazarkhan
Runners-up: Huun-Huur-Tu, Trilok Gurtu, Munojot Yo‘lchiyeva

Americas
Winner: Ibrahim Ferrer
Runners-up: Omar Sosa, Caetano Veloso, Tribalistas

Europe
Winner: Ojos de Brujo
Runners-up: Kroke, Radio Tarifa, Tamara Obrovac

Middle East and North Africa
Winner: Kadim Al Sahir
Runners-up: Mercan Dede, Khaled, Souad Massi

Newcomer
Winner: Warsaw Village Band
Runners-up: Ojos de Brujo, Cibelle, Sevara Nazarkhan

Boundary Crossing
Winner: Think Of One
Runners-up: Bob Brozman, Manu Chao, DuOud

Club Global
Winner: DJ Dolores and Orchestra Santa Massa
Runners-up: Mercan Dede, Panjabi MC, Zuco 103

Critics Award
Winner: Rokia Traoré
Runners-up: Abyssinia Infinite, John Spiers and Jon Boden, Oi Va Voi

Audience Award
Winner: Kadim Al Sahir
Runners-up: Cesária Évora, Sevara Nazarkhan, Tamara Obrovac

Source: 2004 winners and nominees

=== 2005 winners ===
The hosts for the BBC Awards for World Music 2005 Poll Winners' Concert were Eliza Carthy and Benjamin Zephaniah. The award recipients were as follows:

Africa
Winner: Tinariwen
Runners-up: Thandiswa Mazwai, Rokia Traore, Youssou N'Dour

Asia/Pacific
Winner: Kaushiki Chakrabarty
Runners-up: Faiz Ali Faiz, Sainkho Namtchylak, Sevara Nazarkhan

Americas
Winner: Lhasa
Runners-up: Bebel Gilberto, Bajofondo Tango Club, Lila Downs

Europe
Winner: Amparanoia
Runners-up: Enzo Avitabile & Bottari, Ivo Papasov, Ojos de Brujo

Middle East and North Africa
Winner: Khaled
Runners-up: The Chehade Brothers, Mercan Dede, Souad Massi

Newcomer
Winner: Chango Spasiuk
Runners-up: Ba Cissoko, Amparanoia, Yasmin Levy

Boundary Crossing
Winner: Bebo Valdés and Diego El Cigala
Runners-up: Björk, Clotaire K, Lhasa

Club Global
Winner: Clotaire K
Runners-up: Gilles Peterson, Gotan Project, Mercan Dede

Critics Award
Winner: Youssou N'Dour
Runners-up: Lhasa, Tinariwen, Andrew Cronshaw

Audience Award
Winner: Ivo Papasov
Runners-up: The Chehade Brothers, Enzo Avitabile & Bottari, Mercan Dede

Source: 2005 winners and nominees

=== 2006 winners ===
Africa
Winner: Amadou & Mariam
Runners-up: Emmanuel Jal, Ali Farka Toure, Lura

The Americas
Winner: Ry Cooder
Runners-up: Omar Sosa, Carlos Vives, Seu Jorge

Middle East and North Africa
Winner: Souad Massi
Runners-up: Ilham al-Madfai, Rachid Taha, Dhafer Youssef

Asia/Pacific
Winner: Sain Zahoor
Runners-up: Faiz Ali Faiz, Susheela Raman, Yat-Kha

Europe
Winner: Fanfare Ciocarlia
Runners-up: Armenian Navy Band, Enzo Avitabile and Bottari, Mariza

Club Global
Winner: DJ Shantel
Runners-up: M.I.A, Cheb i Sabbah, Mercan Dede

Boundary Crossing
Winners: Nitin Sawhney
Runners-up: Asha Bhosle and Kronos Quartet, Kimmo Pohjonen, Yasmin Levy

Newcomer
Winner: Konono N°1
Runners-up: Dobet Gnahore, Daby Toure, Lura

Album of the Year
Winner: Amadou and Mariam - Dimanche à Bamako
Runners-up: Thione Seck - Orientation, Salif Keita - M'Bemba, Ali Farka Toure and Toumani Diabate - In the Heart of the Moon

Audience Award
Winner: Armenian Navy Band - How Much is Your’s

Source: 2006 winners and nominees

=== 2007 winners ===
Africa
Winner: Mahmoud Ahmed
Runners-up: Ali Farka Toure, Bongo Maffin, Toumani Diabate

The Americas
Winner: Gogol Bordello
Runners-up: Ben Harper, Fonseca, Lila Downs

Middle East and North Africa
Winner: Ghada Shbeir
Runners-up: Les Boukakes, Natacha Atlas, Yasmin Levy

Asia/Pacific
Winner: Debashish Bhattacharya
Runners-up: Anoushka Shankar, Dadawa, Fat Freddy's Drop

Europe
Winner: Camille
Runners-up: Lo'Jo, Mariza, Ojos de Brujo

Club Global
Winner: Gotan Project
Runners-up: Balkan Beat Box, Cheb i Sabbah, Mercan Dede

Culture Crossing
Winner: Maurice El Medioni & Roberto Rodriguez
Runners-up: Aida Nadeem, Ska Cubano, Think of One (band)

Newcomer
Winner: K'naan
Runners-up: Etran Finatawa, Nuru Kane, Sara Tavares

Album of the Year
Winner: Ali Farka Touré - Savane
Runners-up: Bellowhead - Burlesque, Lila Downs - La Cantina Narada, Toumani Diabaté and the Symmetric Orchestra - Boulevard de l'Independance

Audience Award
Winner: Ghada Shbeir

Source: 2007 winners, 2007 nominees

=== 2008 winners ===
Africa
Winner: Bassekou Kouyate & Ngoni Ba
Runners-up: Simphiwe Dana, Tinariwen, Toumani Diabaté and the Symmetric Orchestra

The Americas
Winner: Andy Palacio & The Garifuna Collective
Runners-up: Bajofondo Tango Club, Hazmat Modine, Maria Rita

Middle East and North Africa
Winner: Rachid Taha
Runners-up: Malouma, Nass El Ghiwane, The Idan Raichel Project

Asia/Pacific
Winner: Sa Dingding
Runners-up: Anoushka Shankar & Karsh Kale, Faiz Ali Faiz, Huun Huur Tu

Europe
Winner: Son de la Frontera
Runners-up: Manu Chao, Ojos de Brujo, Thierry 'Titi' Robin

Club Global
Winner: Transglobal Underground
Runners-up: Balkan Beat Box, Bajofondo Tango Club, Gaudi & Nusrat Fateh Ali Khan

Culture Crossing
Winner: Justin Adams & Juldeh Camara
Runners-up: Balkan Beat Box, Bole2Harlem, The Idan Raichel Project

Newcomer
Winner: Mayra Andrade
Runners-up: Balkan Beat Box, Bassekou Kouyate & Ngoni Ba, Vieux Farka Touré

Album of the Year
Winner: Bassekou Kouyate & Ngoni Ba - Segu Blue
Runners-up: Andy Palacio & the Garifuna Collective - Wátina, Orchestra Baobab - Made In Dakar, Tinariwen - Aman Iman

Source: 2008 nominees, 2008 winners

== See also ==
- Awards for world music
