= Coke Studio Bel 3arabi =

- Created by: Coca-Cola
- Based on: Coke Studio Pakistan

Production
- Running time: 45 minutes

Original release
- Network: Middle East Broadcasting Center
- Release: 11 April 2012 – 31 October 2014

Coke Studio Bel 3arabi (Coke Studio بالعربي) is a music television programme in the Middle East and North Africa featuring performances by various Arabic and international music artists. It is inspired by the Pakistani show of the same name.

It is a program that brings together established Arab and international artists to collaborate and record an original fusion song meshing two or more unique genres of music.

== Season 1 (2012) ==
=== Scheduled episode line-up ===
- Episode 1
  - Episode Airing Date: 11 April 2012
  - Episode Theme: Oriental Music - Pop meets Flamenco music
  - Artists Profile: Nancy Ajram, an Arab pop music icon meets José Gálvez who comes from a pure Gypsy Spanish tradition.
- Episode 2
  - Episode Airing Date: 18 April 2012
  - Episode Theme: Oriental Tarab music meets Yugoslavian Gypsy Music
  - Artists Profile: Syrian artist, Rouwaida Attieh and Bilal who hails from the "Nawar" Gypsy clan in Lebanon are paired with The Yugoslavian Gypsy Brass Band from the Balkan.
- Episode 3
  - Episode Airing Date: 25 April 2012
  - Episode Theme: Oriental music meets Opera
  - Artists Profile: Yara with her soulful and soft vocals meets Tino Favazza, a Sicilian tenor. They come together to create a fusion where the Oriental music meets Opera.
- Episode 4
  - Episode Airing Date: 2 May 2012
  - Episode Theme: Oriental music meets House music
  - Artists Profile: Jannat from Morocco with her tender voice along with The Chehade Brothers (Farid and Rami Chehade) with their traditional music meet the avant-garde DJ Jerry Ropero. The three artists meet to create a fusion of Oriental and House music to "Niyal Albou".
- Episode 5
  - Episode Airing Date: 9 May 2012
  - Episode Theme: Oriental Music meets Hip Hop music
  - Artists Profile: Mohamed Hamaki a star of the Arabic music meets Jay Sean the international hip hop artist with more than 8 million copies sold for his first 2 singles. The come together to create a fusion rendition of "Mustafa ya Mustafa".
- Episode 6
  - Episode Airing Date: 16 May 2012
  - Episode Theme: Oriental Music meets Reggae music
  - Artists Profile: Mohamed Mounir, the King, the most renowned Egyptian artist meets The Wailers, who along with Bob Marley defined Reggae Music. They come together to create a fusion where Egyptian music meets Reggae music.
- Episode 7
  - Episode Airing: 23 May 2012
  - Episode Theme: Oriental Music meets R&B music
  - Artists Profile: Saber Al Robai a star of the Arabic and a distinctive voice along Cairokee, the first rock band meet with Shontelle the gifted as both a writer and a singer, that carved a reputation in the Caribbean music world over the last several years. They all come together to create a fusion where the Oriental music meets R&B music.
- Episode 8
  - Episode airing: 30 May 2012
  - Episode Theme: Oriental music meets Tango
  - Artists Profile: Wadih El Safi, the famous Lebanese cultural icon, also known as the "Voice of Lebanon", meets Fabien Bertero, a young Argentinean musician, violinist, arranger, and composer. The artists combine their voices and talents to come up with a one-of-a-kind fusion song.
- Episode 9
  - Episode airing: 6 June 2012
  - Episode Theme: Best of Coke Studio Middle East

== Season 2 (2013) ==
Hosts: Abdel Fattah Grini & Bruna Tameih

Sound Director: Hadi Sharara

=== Scheduled episode line-up ===
- Episode 1
  - Episode Airing Date: 25 April 2013
  - Artists Profile: Sherine Abdel Wahab from Egypt & Nelly from USA
  - Fusion Song: Just A Dream
- Episode 2
  - Episode Airing Date: 2 May 2013
  - Artists Profile: Karol Saqr from Lebanon & Mika from UK
  - Fusion Song: Relax, Take It Easy
- Episode 3
  - Episode Airing Date: 9 May 2013
  - Artists Profile: Cairokee from Egypt & Ayo from Nigeria - Germany
  - Fusion Song: Fire/Ethbat Makanak
- Episode 4
  - Episode Airing Date: 16 May 2013
  - Artists Profile: Kadim Al Sahir from Iraq & Dimitri from France
  - Fusion Song: Fakihat Al Hob
- Episode 5
  - Episode Airing Date: 23 May 2013
  - Artists Profile: Shamma Hamdan from UAE & Jay Sean from UK
  - Fusion Song: Down
- Episode 6
  - Episode Airing Date: 30 May 2013
  - Artists Profile: Myriam Fares from Lebanon & Flo Rida from USA
  - Fusion Song: Wild Ones
- Episode 7
  - Episode Airing: 6 June 2013
  - Artists Profile: Waed from KSA & Yves Larock from Switzerland
  - Fusion Song: Rise Up
- Episode 8
  - Episode airing: 13 June 2013
  - Artists Profile: Naya from Lebanon & Edward Maya from Romania
  - Fusion Song: Men Idi
- Episode 9
  - Episode airing: 20 June 2013
  - Artists Profile: Mohamed Hamaki from Egypt & Mustafa Sandal from Turkey
  - Fusion Song: En Büyük Hikaye/We Eftakart
- Episode 10
  - Episode airing: 28 June 2013
  - Episode Theme: Best of Coke Studio Bel 3arabi - Season Two
  - Promo Song: Abdel Fattah Grini - Oyouno El Kahla

== Season 3 (2014) ==
- Episode 1
  - Episode airing: 12 Sep 2014
  - Artist Profile: Assala Nasri from Syria & Kool & the Gang from USA
  - Fusion Song: She's Fresh
- Episode 2
  - Episode airing: 19 Sep 2014
  - Artist Profile: Shatha Hassoun from Iraq & Tom Novy from Germany
  - Fusion Song: Al Ein Molayatin
- Episode 3
  - Episode airing: 19 Sep 2014
  - Artist Profile: JadaL from Jordan & Diana Yukawa from Japan
  - Fusion Song: Jaddele
- Episode 4
  - Episode airing: 10 Oct 2014
  - Artist Profile: Maya Diab from Lebanon & Jason Derulo from USA
  - Fusion Song: Talk To Me
- Episode 5
  - Episode airing: 17 Oct 2014
  - Artist Profile: Mashrou' Leila from Lebanon & Nile Rodgers from USA
  - Fusion Song: Get Lucky
- Episode 6
  - Episode airing: 24 Oct 2014
  - Artist Profile: BLAK R from KSA & Sandy Mölling from Germany
  - Fusion Song: Derailed
- Episode 7
  - Episode airing: 31 Oct 2014
  - Artist Profile: Balqees Ahmed Fathi from Yemen & David Penn from Spain
  - Fusion Song: Ya Hezzaly
