= Michel Elefteriades =

Lebanese artist and politician (born 1970)

Michel Elefteriades ميشال ألفتريادس
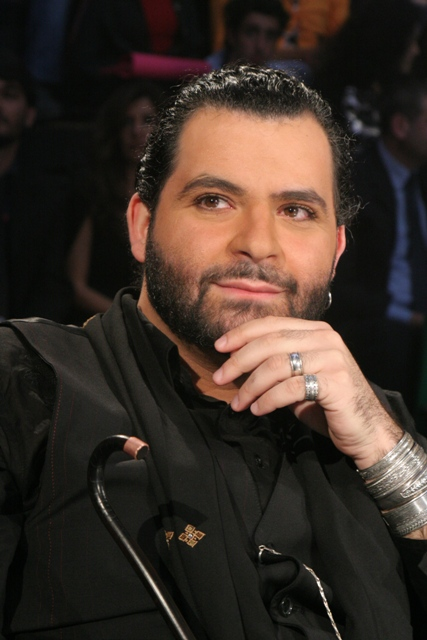
- Michel Elefteriades in 2006

Background information
- Born: 22 June 1970 (age 56)
- Origin: Beirut, Lebanon
- Genres: Arabic music, world music
- Occupations: Politician; Producer; Composer; Arranger
- Years active: 2010–present
- Label: elef.Records

Michel Elefteriades (Arabic: ميشال ألفتريادس; Greek: Μιχαήλ Ελευθεριάδης; born 22 June 1970) is a Lebanese politician, artist, producer and entrepreneur. He is noted in the Arab world for his unorthodox beliefs and opinions, which have generated controversy and ignited passionate responses from his supporters and detractors alike.

== Education and background ==
Elefteriades was born in 1970 in Beirut to a Lebanese mother and a Greek father (who is the grandnephew of Saint Chrysostomos of Smyrna, Metropolitan Bishop of Smyrna), the Lebanese-born Elefteriades speaks six languages. He studied Fine Arts and Advertising in Nantes, France, and holds a master's degree in Graphic Design and Communication Arts from the Lebanese Academy of Fine Arts (ALBA).

=== Chrysostomos of Smyrna ===
Metropolitan Chrysostomos Kalafatis, born on January 8, 1867, in Triglia (today Zeytinbağı), in Bithynia, and massacred in Smyrna (today İzmir), is the great-great-uncle of Michel Elefteriades. In 1902 Chrysostomos Kalafatis was elected Metropolitan of Drama. In September 1922, during the Greco-Turkish War, Bishop Chrysostomos succumbed in the streets of İzmir, after humiliating and atrocious mutilations and tortures. He was declared a martyr and a saint of the Eastern Orthodox Church by the Holy Synod of the Church of Greece on 4 November 1992. His feast day is on the Sunday before the Exaltation of the Holy Cross (7-13 September).

== Music and show business career ==
Elefteriades is an author and composer of more than 120 songs for such European and Arab artists as: Tony Hanna, Demis Roussos, Jean-Jacques Lafon, Nahawand, Hanine Y Son Cubano, Sébastien El Chato, Jose Gàlvez, Jose Fernandez, as well as a collective work featuring Saber Rebaï, Moein Sharif, Wadih El Safi, and Mohamad el Mazem. Elefteriades is considered an Arab pioneer of World Music fusion.

As a music producer and song arranger, some of his creations are considered successful musical experiments in the Arab world.

A few of these are:

- Hanine Y Son Cubano.
- Wadih El Safi in duo with Jose Fernandez.
- Demis Roussos & the Oriental Roots Orchestra.
- Tony Hanna & the Yugoslavian Gipsy Brass Band.

He has directed a number of music videos, for such artists as Galvez, Demis Roussos, Tony Hanna, The Chehade Brothers, Hanine Y Son Cubano, Nahawand, Tania Saleh, José Fernandez, Abdel Karim Chaar, Yusra, Rom Bakhtale, Tino Favazza. Elefteriades has also directed documentaries about Tony Hanna and on the life of Nahawand.

=== Events organization ===
In 1999, Elefteriades founded the "Mediterraneo Byblos International Festival", and was its director from 1999 to 2003. He wrote, composed and directed the 2004 "The Journey of Four Songs", a musical for the Baalbeck International Festival.

=== Elef.Records ===
Elefteriades is founder and co-owner of "Elef.Records", a former Warner Music label which has produced the following albums:

- Bilal The Gipsy Prince – Live at the MusicHall
- The Chehade Brothers – Live at the MusicHall
- The Chehade Brothers – A Bridge Over the Mediterranean
- Hanine Y Son Cubano – Arabo-Cuban, 10908 and The Festivals Album
- Jose Fernandez – Makhlouta
- Jose Gálvez & the National Orchestra of Nowheristan
- Lautaris
- Michel Elefteriades – L’Empereur chante – self-produced
- Mounir El Khawli – The Dragon of Tarab
- Nahawand
- Tania Saleh
- Tony Hanna & the Yugoslavian Gipsy Brass Band – My Village, Lost Somewhere Between Beograd And Baghdad
- Wadih El Safi & Jose Fernandez

=== Television ===
Elefteriades appeared as judge for two seasons on The X Factor, XSeer Al Najah (the Arabic version of The X Factor), in 2006 and 2007, which earned him the sobriquet of "the Arabian Simon Cowell".

In 2012, Elefteriades produced and created Western/Oriental fusion songs for Coke Studio, a music television series in the Middle East and North Africa featuring performances by various established Arab and international music artists brought together to collaborate and record original fusion songs meshing two or more unique music genres.

Although carrying the same name, Coke Studio Pakistan and Coke Studio Middle East have very little in common after all the changes that Elefteriades brought to the original format.

Featured artists were: Wadih El Safi (Lebanon), Nancy Ajram (Lebanon), José Galvez (Spain), The Chehade Brothers (Palestine/Lebanon), tenor Tino Favazza (Italy), DJ Jerry Ropero (Belgium/Spain), Mohamed Hamaki (Egypt), Mohamed Mounir (Egypt), Shontelle (Barbados), The Wailers (Jamaica/USA), The Yugoslavian Gipsy Brass Band (Serbia), Bilal (Lebanon), Rouwaida Attieh (Syria), Yara (Lebanon), Jannat (Morocco), Jay Sean (UK), Saber Rebaï (Tunisia), Fabián Bertero (Argentina) and Cairokee (Egypt).

== Hospitality and Tourism ==
In 2003, Elefteriades founded the "Beirut Music Hall", an 800-seat venue specializing in a unique concept that made it a night-clubbing destination in the Middle East.

In 2013, a second branch of MusicHall was opened in Dubai, UAE.

In that same year Elefteriades also opened "MusicHall Waterfront" in Beirut, an open-air venue near Downtown Beirut's sea side.

And in the summer of 2019, the MusicHall landed in Jeddah, making it the very first club to open in the Kingdom of Saudi Arabia.

In 2015, he purchased a Renaissance palace in Florence, central Italy, dating back to the 15th century. The Palazzo Magnani Feroni is currently a suites accommodation in the heart of Florence and has the highest panoramic roof terrace in the Oltrarno area from which you can see all the major monuments of the city.

In the summer of 2017, Michel Elefteriades opened a new restaurant-lounge, B By Elefteriades, a lavish temple dedicated to the senses and to good taste.

In 2018, Michel Elefteriades decided to invest again in Italy and he acquired from the noble Salviati family, the abandoned Roman church of San Procolo to make it an art gallery in which he would exhibit his medieval religious art collection and creations. The San Procolo church, that was abandoned and closed in 1966, is one of the oldest churches in Florence and it is located in the epicenter of the city, adjacent to Palazzo Bargello. In 2019, after Elefteriades bought the church, the Italian Ministry of Cultural Heritage exercised his diritto de prelazione (right of refusal), due to the importance of this church, a premiere in the last decades. In an interview with “La Republica”, Elefteriades said that he is happy that the ministry and the Superintendency are taking care of the church and that they are doing a fundamental job for the city of Florence.

In spring 2019, he opened The Park By Elefteriades, an open-air venue located on the rooftop of the Yacht Club in Zaytouna Bay in the heart of Beirut.

== Fine arts ==
As a painter, his works have been presented at several collective exhibitions in France, Germany and Lebanon. In 1995, he presented The Wailing Wall, a 10x2 meters piece of art, at a special edition of the Salon des Artistes Décorateurs that took place in the Beirut Central District (instead of its customary location at Paris' Grand Palais). This showing produced such controversy that it required special protection.

As a sculptor, Michel Elefteriades has worked on a series of bronze sculptures which represent capitalism and its influence on men and society. In January 2016, Elefteriades has been summoned to the police station to testify in a case about a supposed sect of satanic worshipers. Some of his work has been interpreted as satanic symbols. Hence, he finds himself in the middle of a controversy orchestrated by the Lebanese Forces in order to intimidate him.

== Writing ==
Elefteriades is the author of two novels, one of which was banned in the Arab world.

Following a series of interviews at “Utopia”, the general district of Nowheristan, the French writer Gérard de Villiers is inspired by the life of Michel Elefteriades to create the character of Mavros Nilatis from the novel “SAS: Le Chemin de Damas”.

== Politics ==
Elefteriades has engaged in political activism from the age of 15. He was an extreme left-wing militant growing up in east Beirut. In 1989, Elefteriades committed himself to the political movement of then Lebanese President, General Michel Aoun.

=== M.U.R. ===
A M.U.R. poster

On 13 October 1990, Syrian forces launched an attack on the Lebanese army, defeating General Aoun; and occupied what still remained of Lebanon's free territory. Elefteriades fled to France. In 1991, he came back to Lebanon and founded the Unified Movements of the Resistance (or M.U.R.), which he led until 1994. M.U.R. was a clandestine, armed group whose stated goal was fighting Lebanon's occupation by foreign armies. Elefteriades was often involved in organizing general strikes designed to paralyze the country. M.U.R. was considered an illegal labor organization and its activities often had to be implemented secretively.

During this period, Elefteriades was the intended victim of two assassination attempts. The first one destroyed his car with a booby-trap; the second attempt targeted him in an armed ambush. He again left Lebanon, living in France and Cuba from 1994 until 1997.

Elefteriades was active in Lebanon's Cedar Revolution as he co-organized, in April 2005, a series of festivities to celebrate national unity, including a program of free concerts that took place in downtown Beirut under the heading of "Independence 05".

=== Activism ===
On 8 October 2007, during a press conference commemorating Che Guevara's capture 40 years earlier, Elefteriades launched a public campaign called "We Won’t Pay Lebanon’s Odious Debts". The action was meant to put pressure on the state to take action on Lebanon's unprecedented public debt of about 40 billion US Dollars, which, at the time of the press conference, was the highest debt-to-GDP ratio in the world. The main objective of the campaign was to raise awareness inside and outside of the country about the nature of Lebanon's loans with the end goal of abolishing its debt. As a result of his activities, the Association of Banks in Lebanon called for the prosecution of Elefteriades, viewing him as a threat to Lebanon's financial stability.

In August 2015, Michel Elefteriades launched the "Movement of the Disgusted" in Lebanon, to bring the collapse of a system that has been in place for decades.

=== The Lebanese Army ===
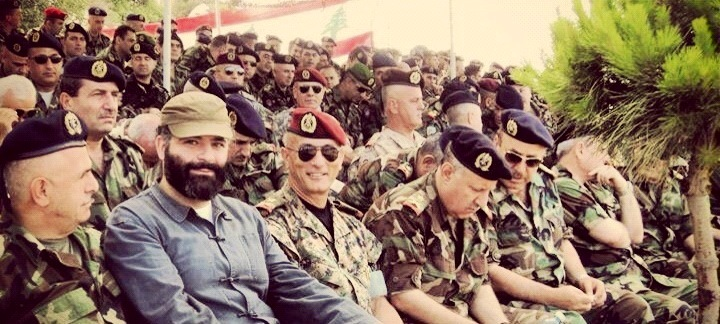
Michel Elefteriades with the commanders of battalions and regiments of the Lebanese army.

Due to his military past and involvement with the army, Michel Elefteriades has strong ties to high-ranked Lebanese army officers.

He is very often seen at military ceremonies and in army gatherings, as well as relentlessly defending the army on TV shows.

To this effect, Elefteriades has launched a campaign calling for military regime in Lebanon on the country's number one talk show "Kalam Ennas" which gave ground to the rumours that Elefteriades has been planning a military coup.

On the other hand, Elefteriades organized a rally at Beirut's Martyrs' Square on 15 October 2015 to thank his good friend, General Chamel Roukoz, for his service to his country.

== Ministry ==
In February 2021, Elefteriades was spoken of as a minister of culture or minister of tourism by Lebanese President Michel Aoun; he handed over a document to Prime Minister Saad Hariri in which he named Michel Elefteriades.

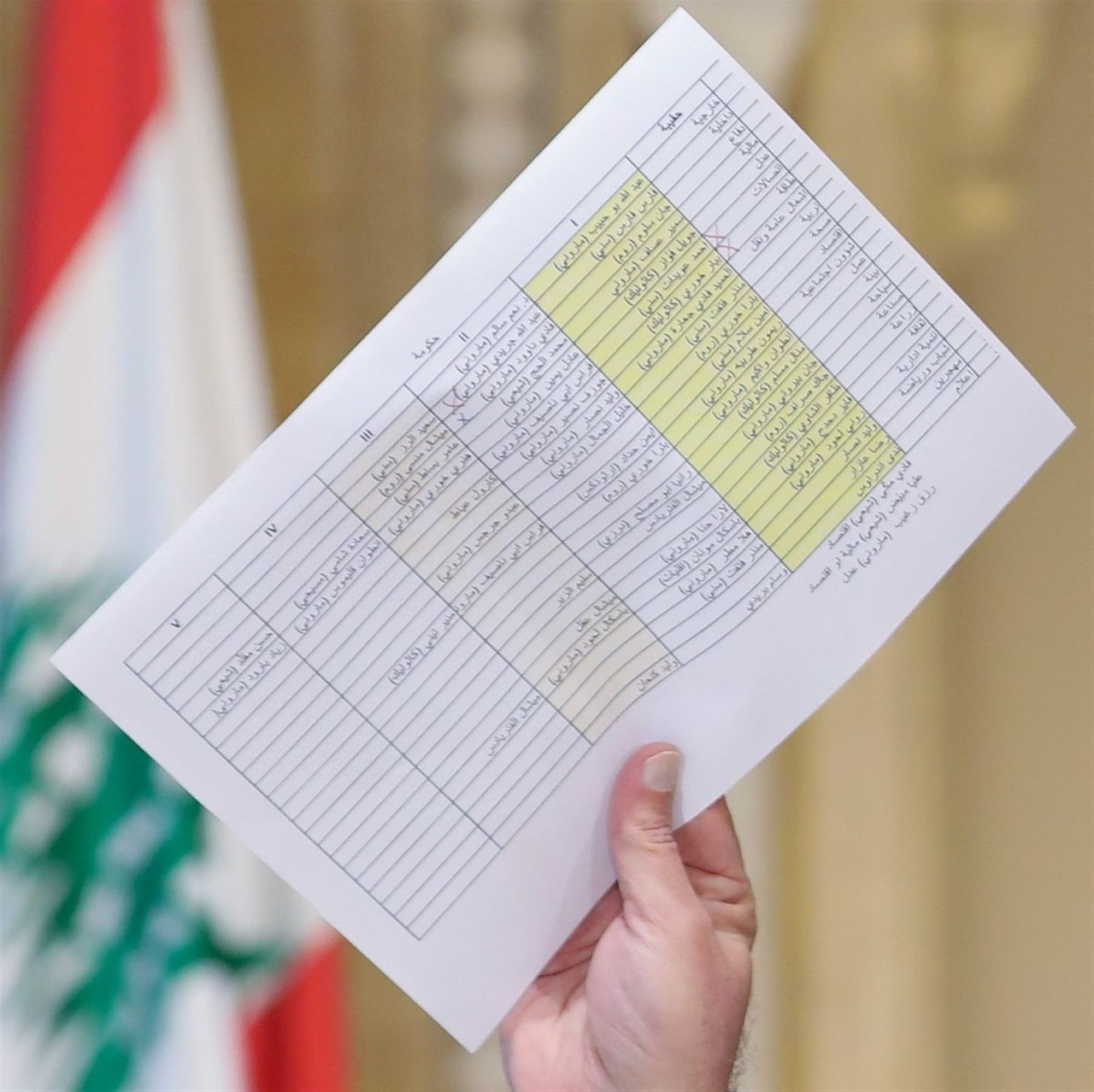
List of suggested ministers

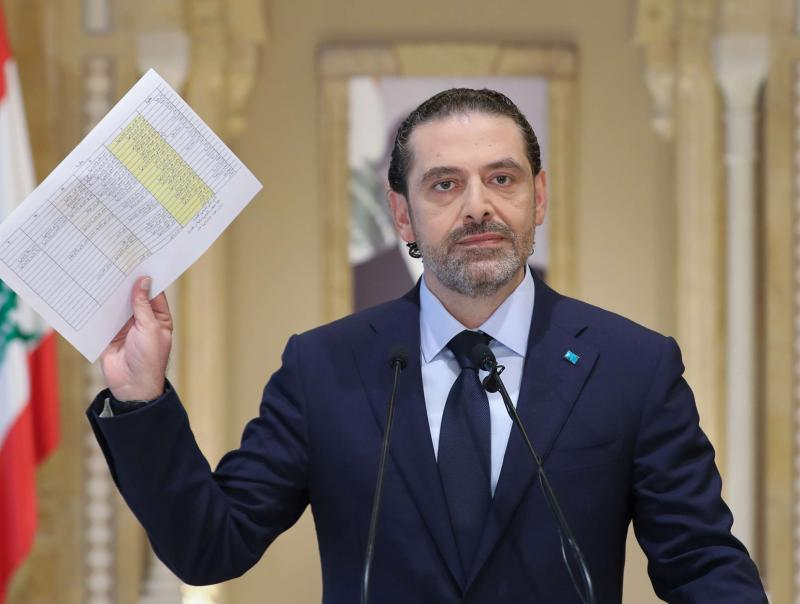
The Prime Minister presenting the list of suggested ministers

== Social commitments ==
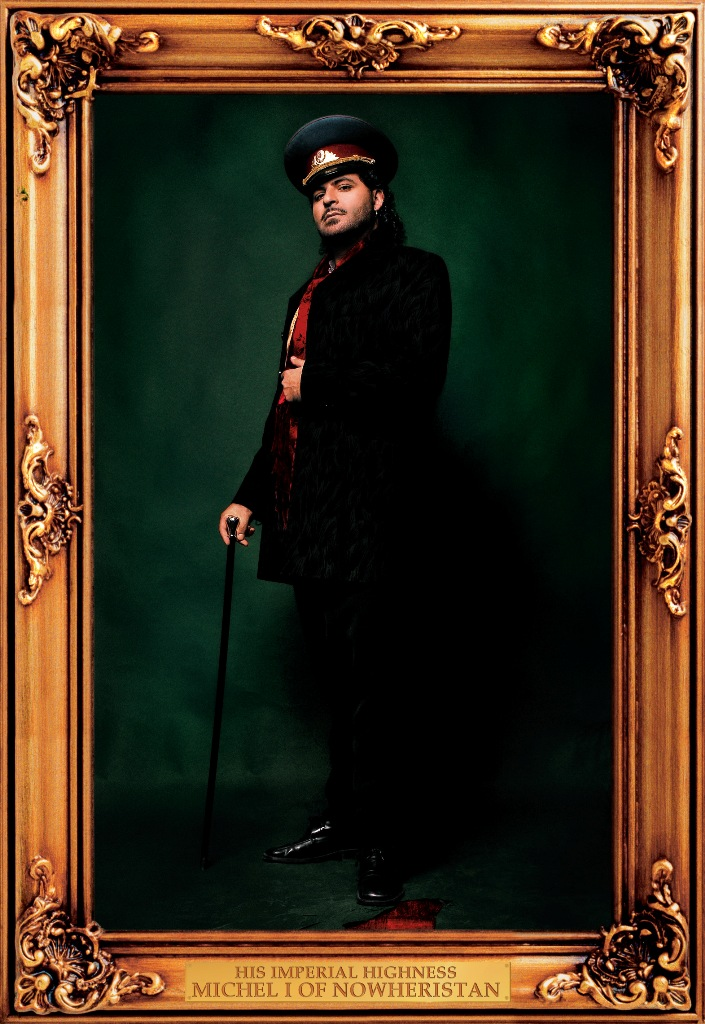
Emperor Michel I of Nowheristan

In spring 2005, Elefteriades co-organized a concert in Beirut, presenting some of the biggest names in Lebanese music: Nancy Ajram, Wadih El Safi, Myriam Fares, Ramy Ayach, Marwan Khoury, Amal Hijazi The entire proceeds of the event were forwarded, through the United Nations, to the southeast Asia tsunami victims. That same year he organized a free concert by the National Orchestra of "Nowheristan" at the UNESCO Palace, in collaboration with the United Nations, to celebrate the International Day of Peace.

In 2006, he was a founding member of Pan-Arab Cultural Icons (or WAYYAK), an NGO which stated mission is to influence disadvantaged Arab neighborhoods through exposure to Arab celebrities.

== Nowheristan promotion ==
Elefteriades envisioned a new social, philosophical, political and cultural approach in his 'founding' of a new nation he named "Nowheristan", which is dedicated to justice, liberation, and equality. The proclamation of the "Great Empire of Nowheristan" received the support of the United Nations and the Lebanese Minister of Culture. Thousands from around the world have applied for citizenship.

Elefteriades', with his self-styled title, "His Imperial Highness Michel I of Nowheristan," promotes his creation with articles, interviews and PR in numerous international media, including: CNN, BBC, France 3 Méditerranée, France 24, TV5, TVE2, Al-Jazeera, Los Angeles Times, Der Spiegel, La Vanguardia, Paris-Match, L'Orient Le Jour, Daily Star, Hurriyet, Al-Ahram, Asharq Al-Awsat, De Standaard.
