= Automobile Club de l'Ouest =

Automotive group in France

- Official logo of L'Automobile Club de l'Ouest
- Abbreviation: ACO
- Formation: 1906
- Headquarters: Circuit de la Sarthe
- Location: Le Mans, France
- Region served: International
- President: Pierre Fillon
- Associate President: Patrick Gruau; Marie Alvarez-Garzon; Dominique Foussier; Gilles Huttepain
- Secretary: François Bourdin
- Staff: 400
- Website: lemans.org

The Automobile Club de l'Ouest (English: Automobile Club of the West), sometimes abbreviated to ACO, is the largest automotive group in France. It was founded in 1906 by car building and racing enthusiasts, and is most famous for being the organising entity behind the annual 24 Hours of Le Mans race. The ACO also lobbies on behalf of French drivers on such issues as road building and maintenance, the availability of driving schools and road safety classes, and the incorporation of technical innovations into new vehicles. It also runs a roadside assistance service for its members.

== History ==
The ACO's history begins with the Automobile Club de la Sarthe, the ancestor of today's ACO, which was founded in the town of Le Mans. In 1906 that group included Amédée Bollée and Paul Jamin, winner of the 1897 Paris-Dieppe race in a Léon Bollée tricar. With the help of the larger Automobile Club de France they organised a race on local public roads, on a 65-mile triangular course connecting Le Mans with Saint-Calais and La Ferté-Bernard. The 12-lap race, titled the Grand Prix de l'ACF, was held over two days and won by Ferenc Szisz driving a Renault, This race, the first Grand Prix, would eventually become the French Grand Prix.

After World War I, the ACO turned its attention to designing a shorter circuit on public roads to the south of the city. The organisation's chief secretary Georges Durand, together with magazine editor Charles Faroux of La Vie Automobile and tyre manufacturer Emile Coquille, came up with the idea for a 24-hour race. The first 24 Hours of Le Mans was held on 26 May 1923. The very first entry was lodged with the ACO by John Duff on a Bentley.

=== World War Two and aftermath ===
The Le Mans circuit was occupied by the Royal Air Force in 1940 and then by the Germans at the end of that year. Le Mans was liberated in August, 1944, but it was almost five years before the 24 Hours took place again.

Following the war, the grounds of the ACO and the circuit were in ruins, bombed by the Allies and further destroyed by the Germans. The ACO set about the task of reconstruction, aided by Government Minister and Sarthe députée Christian Pineau who provided the first millions. In addition the ACO launched a loan. In 1946 the British Racing Drivers' Club opened a "Le Mans Fund" for the benefit of the ACO, raising a grand total of £358 and 11 shillings, to assist with the rehabilitation of the facilities at the Le Mans circuit.

Rebuilding of the circuit started on February 7, 1949, and the first post-war event at Le Mans was held on 25–26 June of that year. Pineau, standing beside Charles Faroux, gave the starting signal. Two new spectator stands were named for racing drivers and resistance fighters Robert Benoist and Jean-Pierre Wimille.

=== 1955 Le Mans disaster ===
During the ACO's 24 Hours of Le Mans event in 1955, an accident occurred which killed 84 people, regarded as the worst accident in motorsport history. It led to many actions by the ACO to subsequently change buildings and the procedures used at the circuit, as well as to redesign the pit lane and front stretch where the accident occurred. It also led to a change of ACO rules for the type of cars permitted in the 24 Hours of Le Mans for the following years, as well as applying a fuel-consumption formula.

== Presidents ==
- Adolphe Singher (1906–1910)
- Gustave Singher (1910–1947)
- Paul Jamin (1947–1951)
- Jean-Marie Lelièvre (1951–1973)
- Raymond Gouloumès (1973–1992)
- Michel Cosson (1992–2003)
- Jean-Claude Plassart (2003–2012)
- Pierre Fillon (2012–)

== Racing ==
The 1967 French Grand Prix was a Formula One race held on the Bugatti Circuit, Le Mans, on July 2, 1967. Motor Sport called it "The Grand Prix of the Car Parks." It was an innovation not repeated.

The ACO is responsible as a ruling body for race series, specifically sportscar series. The ACO has run or backed the following races or race series:

Current

- 24 Hours of Le Mans
- 24 Hours of Le Mans Moto
- Le Mans Classic
- French motorcycle Grand Prix
- FIA World Endurance Championship
- Asian Le Mans Series
- European Le Mans Series
- Le Mans Cup
- Asian Le Mans Cup
- Prototype Cup Europe

Former

- 1000 km of Le Mans
- American Le Mans Series
- European Le Mans Series
- Japan Le Mans Challenge
- Intercontinental Le Mans Cup
- Formula Le Mans
- Le Mans Autumn Cup
- World Sportscar Championship
- FRD LMP3 Series
- UK LMP3 Cup Championship

== See also ==
- Fédération Française du Sport Automobile
- Fédération Internationale de l'Automobile
