= Bilyaletdinov =

Bilyaletdinov (Russian: Билялетдинов, Tatar: Билалетдинев, romanized: Bilaletdinev) is a Tatar surname, which is derived from the Arabic Bilāl (بلال), al-Dīn (الْدِّين) and Russian suffix ov / ev (ов, ев). It may refer to:

- Diniyar Bilyaletdinov (born 1985), Russian footballer
- Rinat Bilyaletdinov (born 1957), Russian footballer and coach, father of Diniyar
- Zinetula Bilyaletdinov (born 1955), Russian hockey player and coach
