= Dobet Gnahoré =

Ivorian musician

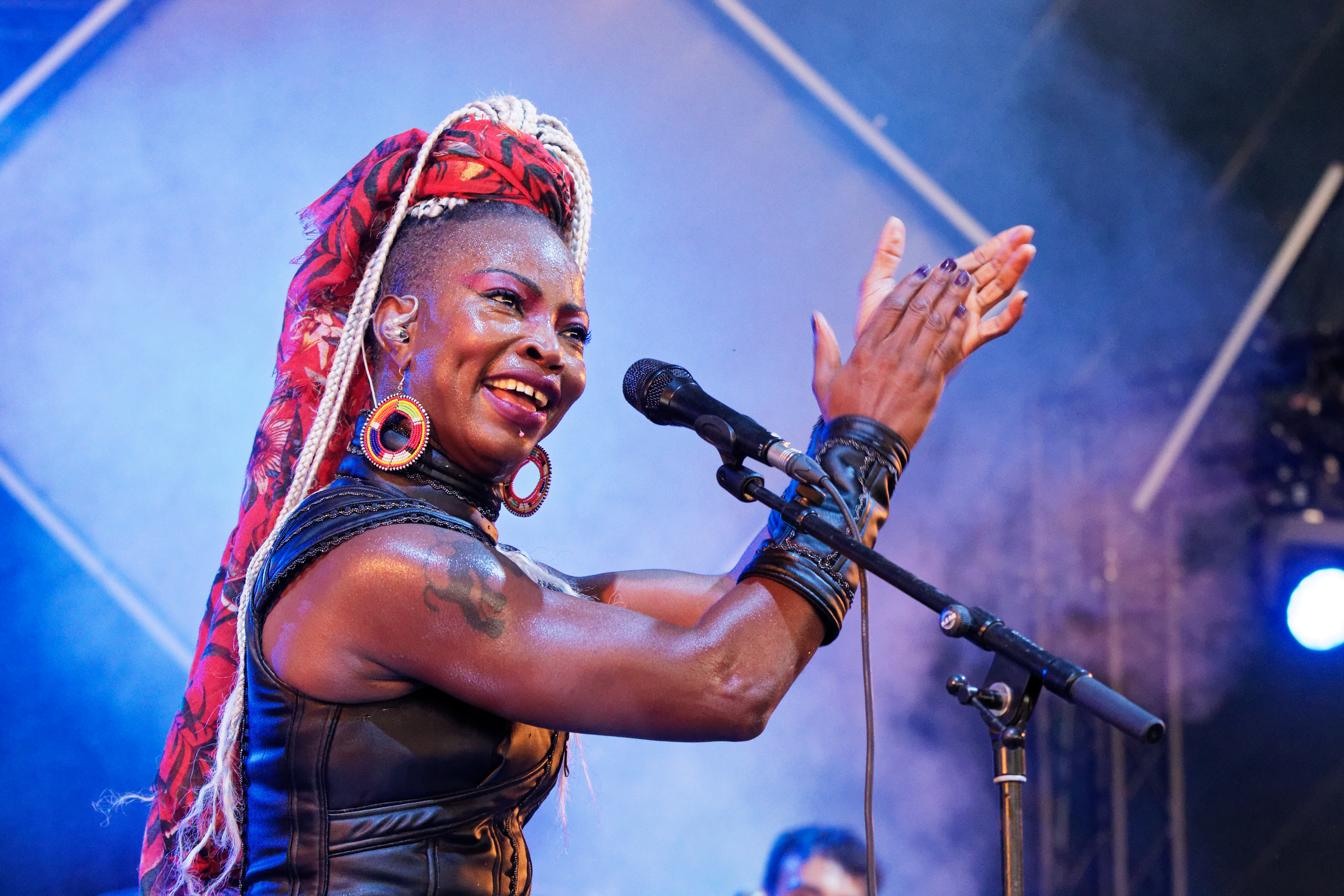
Dobet Gnahoré at the Festival du bout du monde (in French) in 2018

Dobet Gnahoré (born 17 June 1982) is a singer from Côte d'Ivoire. The daughter of percussionist Boni Gnahoré, she plays with the group Na Afriki, consisting mainly of French and Tunisian musicians, who accompany her with the guitar, sanza, the balafon, the calebasse and bongos. Due to the civil war, she moved to France in 1999. In 2004, Gnahoré released her debut album Ano Neko. In 2006, She was a nominee at the BBC Radio 3 Awards for World Music for Newcomer. In 2010, she shared an award for Best Urban/Alternative Performance with India.Arie at the 52nd Grammy Awards.

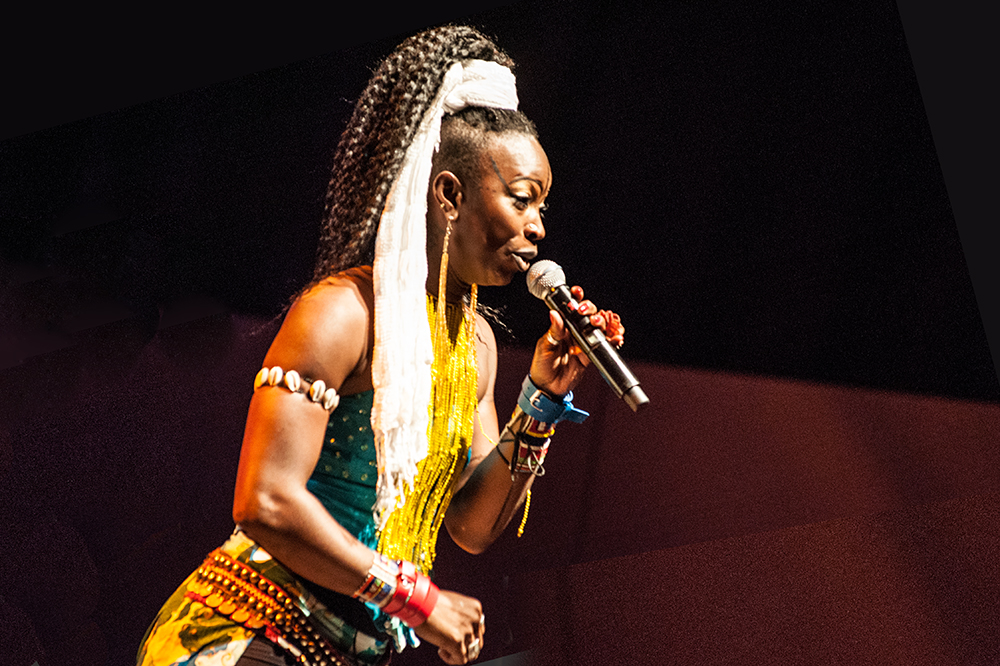
Singer Dobet Gnahoré from Ivory Coast performing at the Cross Culture Festival in Warsaw, Poland - September 2012.

== Early life ==
A self-taught musician, who incorporates elements of song, dance, percussion and theatre into her repertoire, she is the daughter of percussionist Boni Gnahoré, who performs with her and the sister of Kiff No Beat band member Black K. She settled in Marseille in 1999 due to the civil war. Having had to move to France due to the Ivorian civil war, she further honed her craft in France under the tutelage of Congolese musician and songwriter Ray Lema, whom she credited as teaching her the basics of music composition and how to construct a song.

== Career ==
In France, Gnahoré met guitarist Colin Laroche de Féline and decided to form a band, Na Afriki. It consists of mainly French and Tunisian musicians, who accompany her with the sanza, the balafon, the calebasse and bongos. The group toured Congo, Gabon, Chad and Equatorial Guinea in the 2000s, and aspects of music from a number of African countries are evident, including Cameroonian bikutsi, Congolese, East African rumba and Manding music, alongside reggae. Her lyrics often deal with pressing social issues, including the importance of family and AIDS. She can sing in seven different languages. Her music ranges from "delicate ballads to upbeat African grooves".

In 2004, Gnahoré released her debut album Ano Neko ('let's create together'). She was a nominee at the 2006 BBC Radio 3 Awards for World Music for Newcomer and in 2010 she shared an award for Best Urban/Alternative Performance for the song "Pearls" with India.Arie at the 52nd Grammy Awards.

== Discography ==
=== Albums ===
- Ano Neko (2004)
- Na Afriki (2007)
- Djekpa La You (2010)
- Na Drê (2014)
- Miziki (2018)
- Couleur (2021)
- Zouzou (2024)
