= Palazzo Magnani Feroni =

Building in Florence, Italy

Coordinates: 43.7686°N 11.2459°E

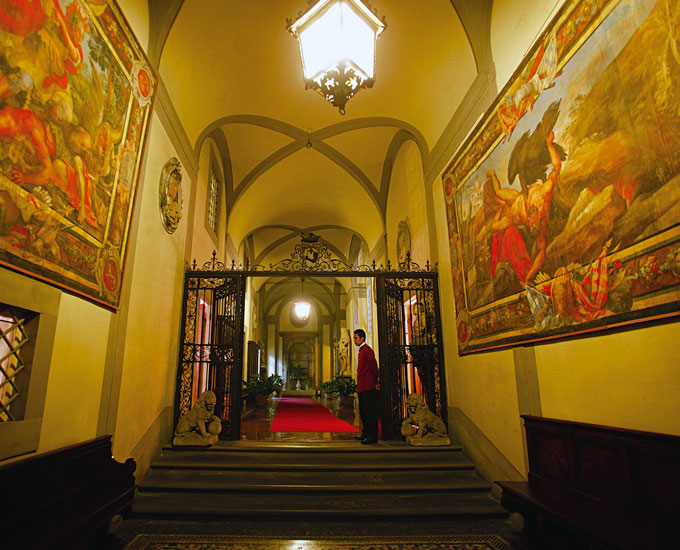
The entrance to Palazzo Magnani Feroni.

The Palazzo Magnani Feroni is a Renaissance Palace in Florence, central Italy, dating back to the 15th century. It is built in the purest Florentine style and is decorated and adorned with statues, paintings and frescoes dating from the 16th century. The entrance-way dates back to the 17th century and leads to the iron gate decorated with the coat-of-arms of the Feroni family: an armour-clad arm, holding a sword and a golden lily.

== History ==
The Del Puglieses, a distinguished family of the Florentine Republic, owned a residence in that area from the early fifteenth century and enlarged it in 1428 by acquiring eight additional smaller apartments, which the previous owner, Niccolò Serragli, had already unified under a single roof. The Del Puglieses are remembered for their patronage of the arts and Giorgio Vasari writes that, in this location, Piero di Cosimo painted a number of stories on the walls of a room, and Fra Bartolomeo a mounted St George atop a flight of stairs.

In the mid-sixteenth century, the palace was divided into two parts. The section towards the bridge became the Del Puglieses' property until their extinction, which occurred in the mid-nineteenth century, whereas the Marquis of Botta, who assembled an important collection of paintings there, inherited the Borgo Stella wing; subsequently it came into the possession of the Marquis Coppoli of Perugia.

The two wings were later reconnected and, around the year 1770, the extremely wealthy Francesco, baptized Giuseppe, Marquis Ubaldo Feroni, purchased the palace. It is known that, by 1769, a palace and several residences in the San Frediano neighborhood had been purchased and that the first phase of renovations ended in 1778. Subsequently and not long afterwards, in 1783, the venerable parish and adjacent monastery of San Frediano were suppressed and the Marquis Ubaldo Feroni also purchased this land to extend all his property to the Piazza del Carmine. Another vast property of seventeen windows was built on the Piazza del Carmine and a generous and pleasant garden took up the entire interior area and that along Borgo Stella. During the French occupation of Italy in the Napoleonic Wars, the Feroni marquises held formal parties and grand balls to celebrate official visits of a sovereign or during annual events, such as the Grand-Duchess' birthday.

The period of Feroni's affluence waned and in 1821 the heirs of Senator Francesco Ubaldo ceded the magnificent property to new and equally prestigious owners, the Magnanis. The Napoleonic embargo drove the Magnanis to risky yet profitable speculation, as a result of which their net worth ballooned and obliged them to take up residence in the capital. Thus, they came to choose this palace as their residence, as it was one of the most spacious in the city and allowed them a suitable and sumptuous abode.

Towards the end of the nineteenth century, the enormous property was inherited from the Magnanis by the Amerighis, an aristocratic family originally from Siena, which held the title through the end of the First World War.

From 2015 to 2019, Palazzo Magnani Feroni was the property of Michel Elefteriades.

== Today ==
The Palazzo is today owned by IGG Inc. and is currently a suites hotel in the heart of Florence, with the highest panoramic roof terrace in the Oltrarno area from which you can see all the major monuments of the city. In October 2017, it was selected among the 3 finalists for the prestigious 2018 Condé Nast Johansens Awards for Excellence in the category: Readers’ Award. Condé Nast is one of the world's biggest mass media companies.
