= Georges Durand =

- Born: September 9, 1917; La Tronche, France
- Died: February 15, 1997 (aged 79); Die, Drôme, France
- Other name: Doris or Dubreuil
- Spouse: Ginette Durand
- Awards: Officer of the Legion of Honour Croix de Guerre with palm Officer of the Order of Merit of the Republic of Poland

Georges Durand, nicknamed Doris or Dubreuil, born on September 9, 1917, in La Tronche, and died on February 15, 1997, in Die was a French Resistance fighter during World War II. He distinguished himself by organizing numerous maquis in the Isère region, primarily the maquis of Grésivaudan, of which he was one of the leaders. Along with his wife Ginette, who was also a resistance fighter, he hid many draft dodgers from the Service du travail obligatoire (STO, Compulsory Work Service).

Arrested on October 23, 1943, he was deported to Buchenwald but managed to escape and join the Allied forces two days before his group was almost entirely executed.

He died in Die on February 15, 1997.

== Biography ==
=== Birth and youth ===
Georges Durand was born in La Tronche on September 9, 1917, into a family originally from Voreppe. His first cousin, André Buissière, would later join the Resistance as well and die during the destruction of the Maquis du Vercors by the Germans. After studying at the Grenoble Institute of Technology, he was employed by the Papeteries de Lancey (papermills) in Villard-Bonnot starting in 1939. He married Ginette Morel-Derocle, a native of Voreppe, in 1940.

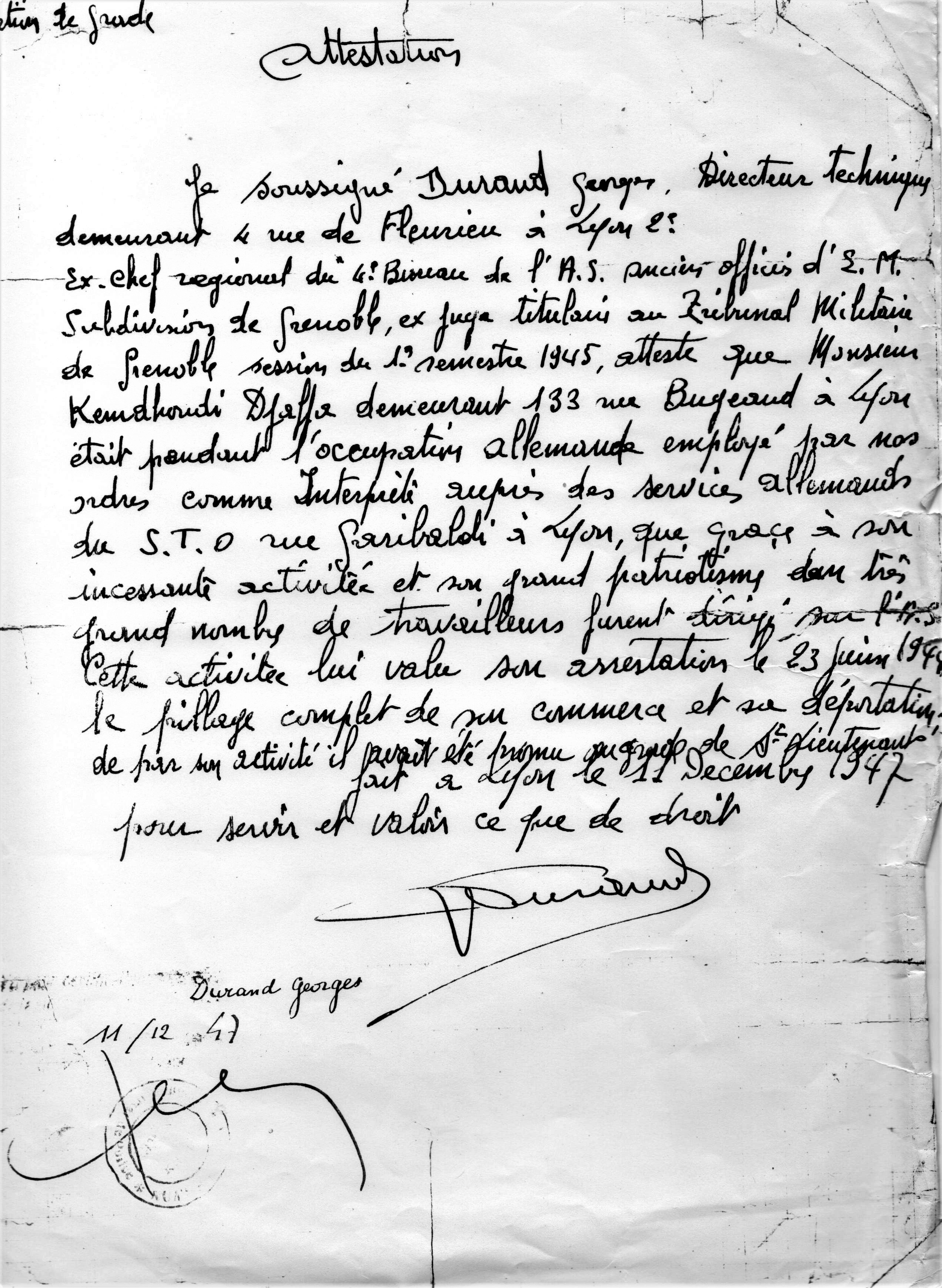
Letter from Georges Durand to Djaafar Khemdoudi, providing information about their connection during the war.

=== Involvement in the Resistance and deportation ===
Georges Durand joined the Resistance and Combat in May 1942, and towards the end of that year, he began organizing the maquis of Grésivaudan. He provided employment to the maquisards at the Papeteries de Lancey to hide them more effectively.

From January 1943, he was in charge of the United Movements of the Resistance (Mouvements unis de la Résistance, M.U.R) in the region. With the doctor Gaston Valois, which he knew through the sportive world, particularly rugby, he created the organization of the Maquis. With the help of vehicles from the Papeteries (paper mills), including trucks, he was able to hide draft dodgers from the Compulsory Work Service in training camps and farms in the region. He played a central role in the creation of several maquis in the Grésivaudan area, including the maquis of Brignoud, Souillière, La Combe-de-Lancey, La Tençon, and Trièves. He took command of "Sector II/Chartreuse" centered around the Grande Chartreuse. His codenames in the Resistance were "Doris" and "Dubreuil".

As part of these operations to smuggle draft dodgers, he was in contact with the Lyon Resistance, particularly Djaafar Khemdoudi, who likely sent him draft dodgers that he managed to hide. He also participated in the military training of draft dodgers and maquis members and engaged in acts of sabotage against regional infrastructure.

While staying at the Hôtel des Alpes in Lancey, he was betrayed by an Englishwoman and arrested on October 23, 1943. He was imprisoned in Grenoble and Fresnes before being deported to the Buchenwald concentration camp.

He managed to escape from a Kommando on April 15, 1945, two days before all the members of his group were executed. He returned to France on May 23, 1945.

=== After the war ===
After the war, Georges Durand became a judge at the military tribunal in Grenoble during the period of the Epuration. He later settled in Lyon, on Rue de Fleurieu in the 2nd arrondissement. He was awarded the rank of Officer of the Legion of Honour, and also received the Croix de Guerre with a palm and became Officer of the Order of Merit of the Republic of Poland.

He died on February 15, 1997, in Die.

== Legacy ==
On May 18, 2018, a park was named in honor of Ginette and Georges Durand in Voreppe. The Isère region organizes a "Resistance Race" in the vicinity of Voreppe, featuring educational panels to explain the role of different maquis groups, including the role of Georges Durand.

== Decorations ==
- Officer of the Legion of Honour (France)
- Croix de Guerre with palm
- Officer of the Order of Merit of the Republic of Poland
