= Hanine Y Son Cubano =

Hanine Y Son Cubano is a music group formed in 1999 that merges Cuban music and Arabic music.

It was in the early 1990s, when he lived in Havana, that Greek-Lebanese Michel Elefteriades came up with the music concept that led in 1999 to the formation of Hanine Y Son Cubano, the Arabo-Cuban music genre.

It was while he was sitting in a cafe in Havana, surrounded by Afro-Cuban sounds, that Elefteriades began singing a classic of the Arabic music, "Ya Habibi ta ala" of the Arab diva Asmahan. Elefteriades spent two years trying to achieve this project.

The band gave birth to a few albums, namely "Arabo-Cuban" distributed by “Warner”, "10908 km", and "The Festivals Album: Baalbeck & Beiteddine".

== Discography ==
- Arabo-Cuban (2002) includes pieces from Mohammed Abdel Wahab, Abdel Halim Hafez, Farid El Atrache, Fairouz and Asmahan rearranged in salsa, Bolero and cha-cha-cha…

Arabo-Cuban.

1. La llave - “Albi W Mouftahou”
2. Afro blue/Zum Zum - “Ana Wel Azab We Hawak”
3. Cuando - “Emta Ha Taaraf”
4. El mambo de los recuerdos - “Aala Bali”
5. El huerfanito - “Ya Habibi Ta'ala”
6. El gallo - “El Helwa Dih”
7. La flor - “Ya Zahratan Fi Khayali”
8. El dia feliz - “Kan Agmal Yom”
9. Descarga Arabo-cubana
10. Pot Pourri
11. El mambo de los recuerdos “Aala Bali” (remixed by Michel Eléftériadès)
12. Presentations : Hanine, Marcelino Linares, Michel Elefteriades
13. Bonus : phrase "Ya se me acabo el repertorio" + rires
- 10908 km (distance as the crow flies from Beirut to Havana)
1. Baladi (salsa salsita)
2. Zourouni (visita me)
3. Lama aa tarik el ein (la fuente)
4. Chaghalouni (ojos del alma)
5. Zeh’ani (soledad)
6. Bhebak w menak khaifi (no llores)
7. Imlali (llena me la copa)
8. Arabo-Cuban improvisation
- The Festivals Album (Baalbeck & Beiteddine Festivals)
1. Rosana
2. Huwwara
3. Dal'ouna
4. Ghzayyil
5. Rahou
6. Tutti Frutti
7. Lama Aa Tarik El Ein
8. Na'eeli Ahla Zahra
9. Salsa Salsita
10. Ya Lalah
11. Aala Nari
12. Rjeena
13. Pot Pourri
