= Faiz Ali Faiz =

Pakistani singer

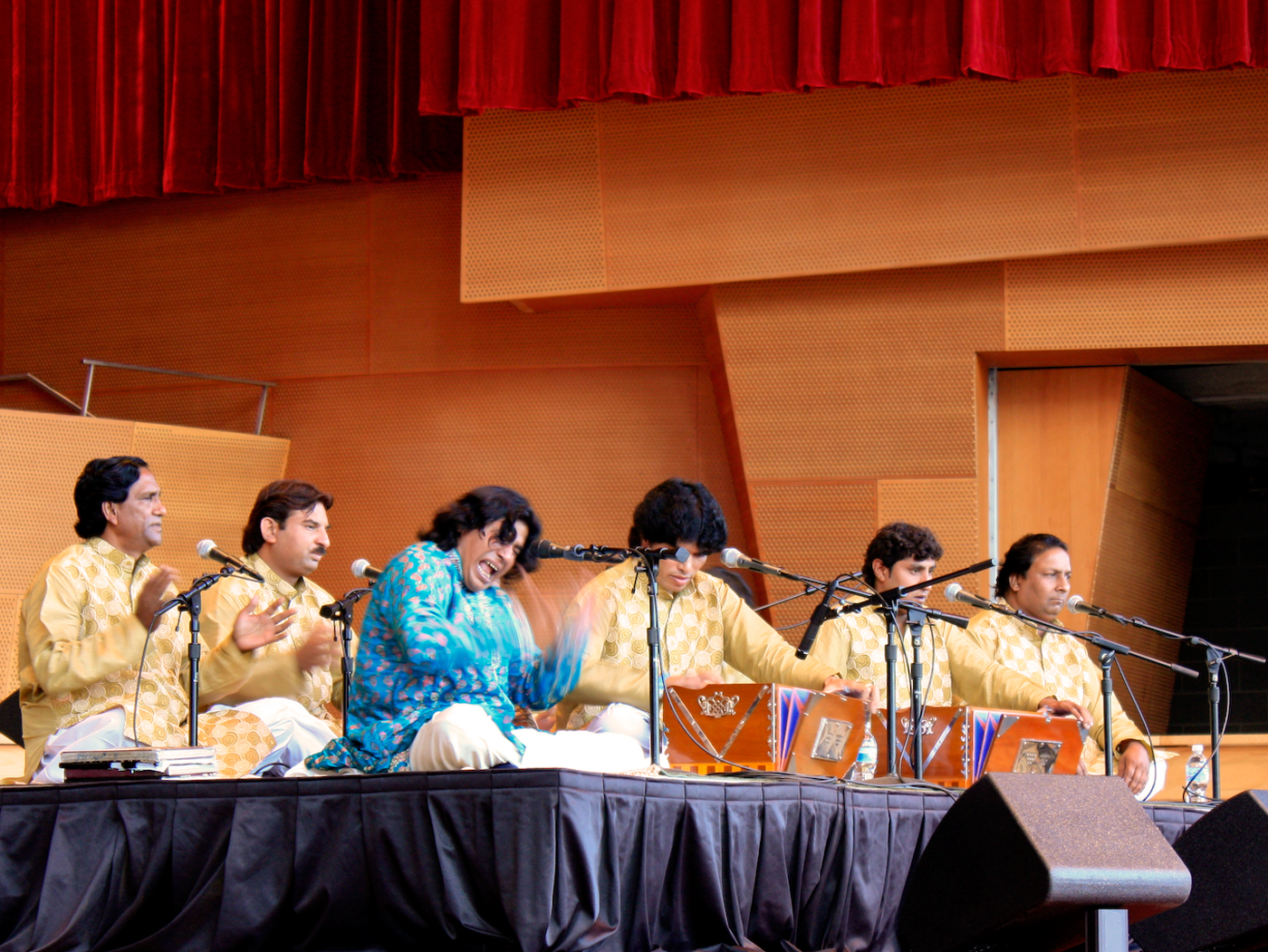
Faiz Ali Faiz and company at Millennium Park.

Faiz Ali Faiz (Urdu: فیض علی فیض; born in 1962 in Sharaqpur, Pakistan) is a Pakistani qawwali singer.

Faiz was born into a family of seven generations of qawwals.

Faiz Ali Faiz was nominated for a BBC Radio 3 World Music Award in 2005 and 2006.

== Discography ==
- Jaadu: Magic, with Titi Robin (2009)

== See also ==
- Islamic music
- Music of Pakistan
- List of Pakistani musicians
