= Bilali =

Bilali is usually a surname. It is derived from the Muslim name Bilal. Notable people with the surname include:

- Afrim Bilali (born 1979), Albanian basketball player
- Amir Bilali (born 1994), Albanian footballer
- Dejvi Bilali (born 1996), Albanian footballer
- Edmir Bilali (born 1970), Albanian footballer
- Ferdinand Bilali (born 1969), Albanian footballer
- Ibrahim Bilali (born 1965), Kenyan boxer
- Suleiman Bilali (born 1978), Kenyan boxer

== See also ==
- Bilali Document, is a handwritten Arabic manuscript on West African Islamic law by Bilali Muhammed
