= The Chehade Brothers =

Palestinian–Lebanese musicians and singers

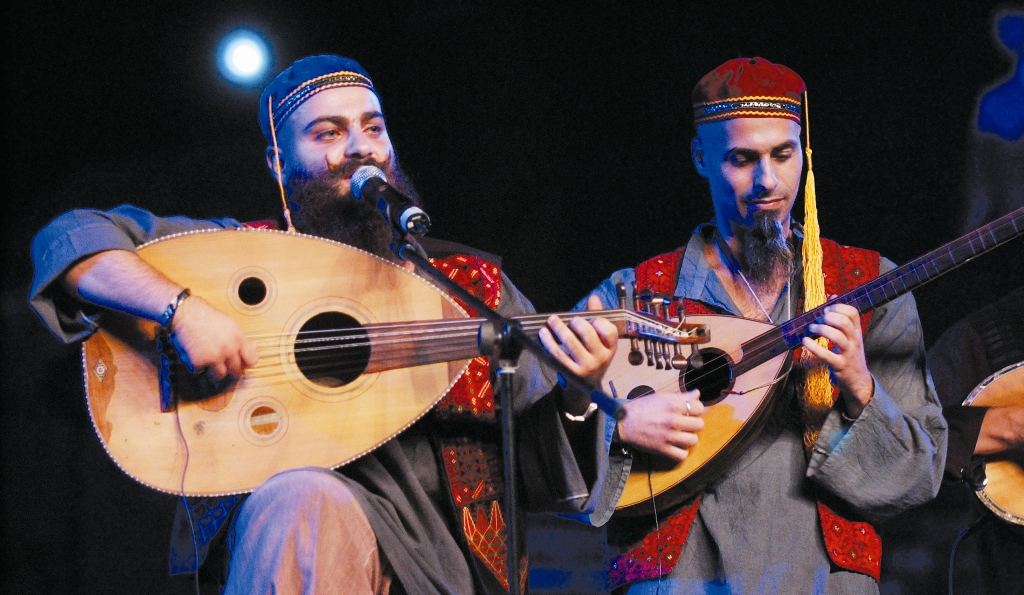
- L to R: Rami Chehade, Farid Chehade.

Background information
- Origin: East Jerusalem
- Genres: World music, Arabic music, Middle Eastern music, Arabesque music, Fusion genre
- Years active: 2003–present
- Label: Elef.Records
- Members: Farid Chehade; Rami Chehade

Farid and Rami Chehade, who perform professionally as the Chehade Brothers, are Palestinian–Lebanese musicians and singers.

Natives of the Old City of Jerusalem, Farid (born in 1975) and Rami (born in 1976) Chehade started studying music at a very young age and have come to master the oriental musical and poetical art forms of zajal, ghazal, hija'a and taqsim. Their professional career as The Chehade Brothers was launched by multifaceted artist and producer Michel Elefteriades. While Rami is the singer in the band, both brothers demonstrate virtuosity in playing all known Arabic musical instruments, ranging from melodic instruments like oud, buzuq, kanun, kamanja and ney to rhythmic instruments like tabla, katem and riq.

== Career ==
Until the late 1990s, Farid and Rami Chehade had performed in numerous concerts in a number of Arab countries and in some international festivals representing Middle Eastern music around the world. Yet, the two brothers were dreaming of a career well beyond the patriotic and revolutionary scene or the circuit of cultural festivals where they merely performed folkloric Palestinian songs; they wanted to make their mark on "popular music" in its broadest sense, taking into consideration all the implications that this may carry. Therefore, they headed to Beirut, Lebanon, where they joined the newly established Oriental Roots Orchestra, an oriental-fashion "big band" formed by Michel Elefteriades with the goal of grouping most outstanding musicians from the Arab world. This collaboration has enriched their compositions with various ethnic influences, making their musical style evolve towards World music fusion, while keeping clearly Middle Eastern roots; a style promoted as belonging to "Nowheristani" music.

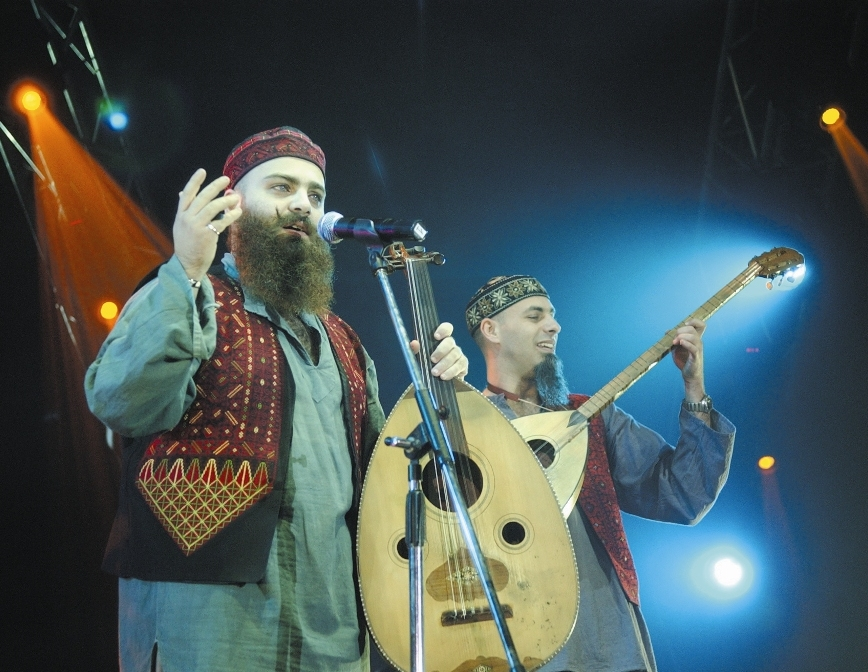
The Chehade Brothers on stage. Farid(right) and Rami Chehade.

=== Album ===
Their collaboration with Michel Elefteriades has also yielded the Chehade Brothers' first album. Composed by the two brothers and arranged by Elefteriades, the album captures the time-honored Tarab mood. They were helped by poet Elia Azar who contributed to the album a set of poetic lyrics that only the talent of the brothers, coupled with Elefteriades' mastery of World Music fusion, could turn into such subtle music, best known in the eastern notion as "inaccessible simplicity". This first album, titled A Bridge Over the Mediterranean, was released by Warner Music in 2004.

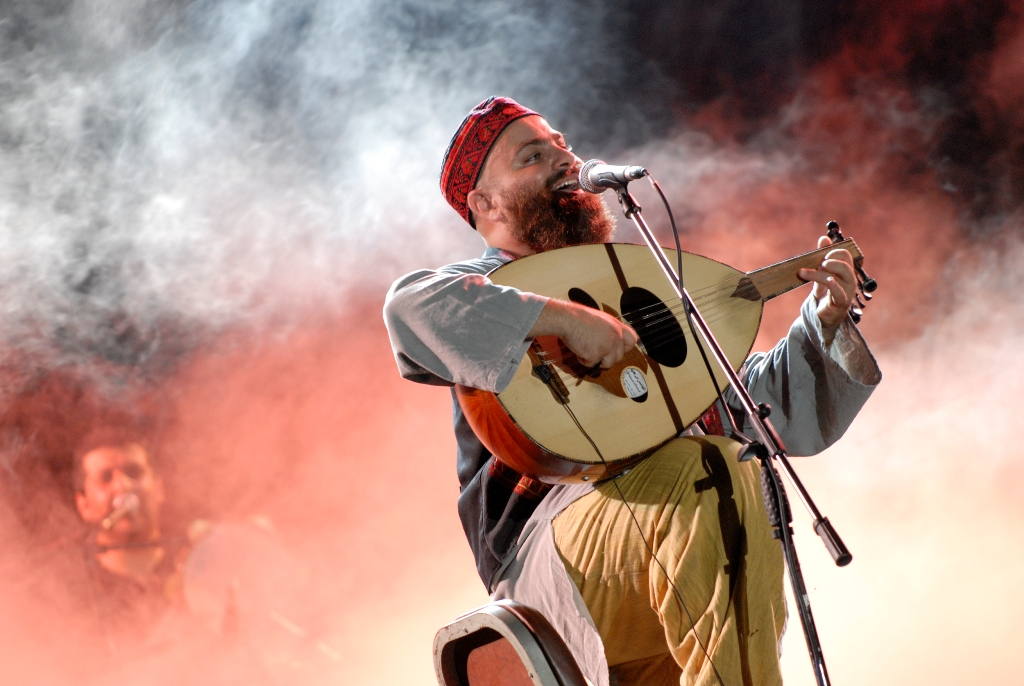
Rami Chehade

=== Award nominations ===
The Chehade Brothers were nominated for two BBC Awards for World Music in 2005:

- BBC Radio 3 World Music Awards
- BBC Radio 3 Audience Awards (Finalists)

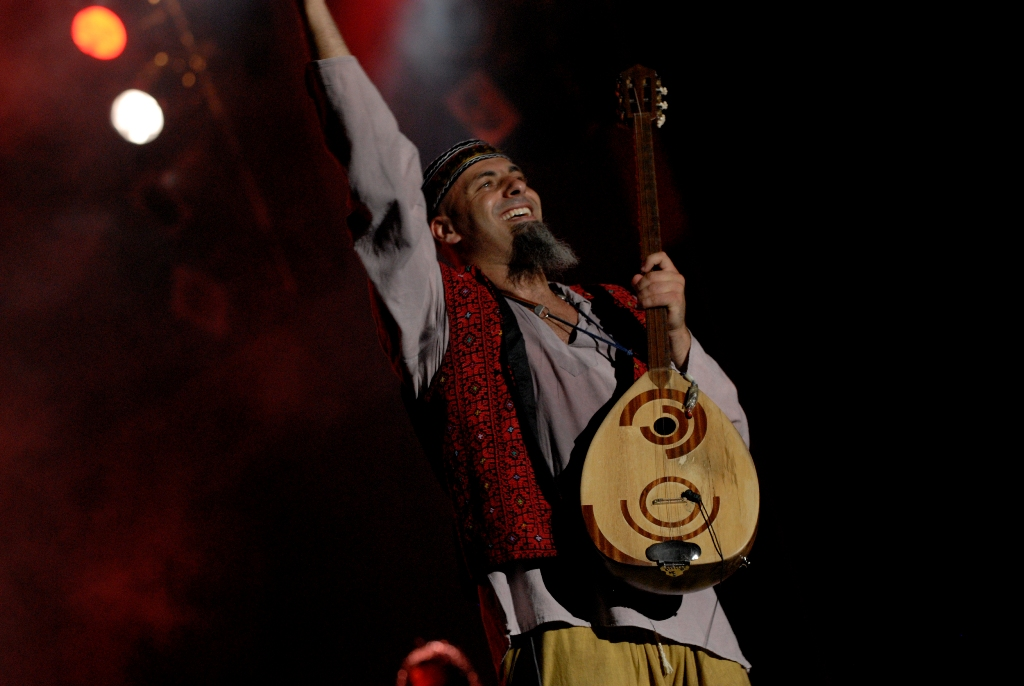
Farid Chehade

=== Present ===
In 2005, the Chehade Brothers began touring throughout Europe and the Middle East, performing in the United Kingdom, Spain, Turkey, Cyprus, Bahrain, Lebanon, Jordan, Syria, Egypt, Algeria, Tunisia, Morocco, and the United Arab Emirates.
