= Tom Novy =

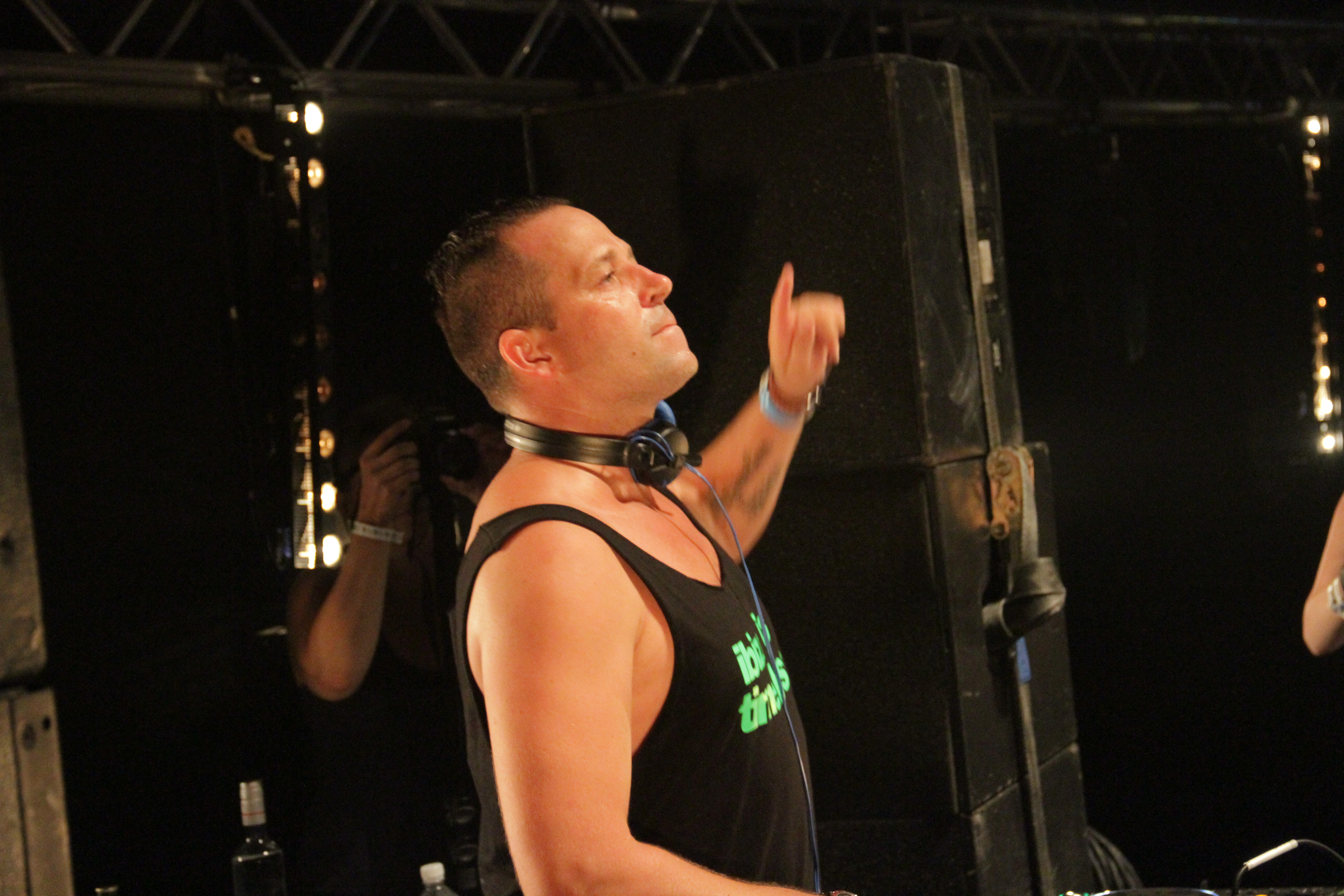
- Tom Novy in 2013

Background information
- Born: Thomas Reichold; 10 March 1970 (age 56); Kaufbeuren, Germany
- Genres: House, dance
- Occupations: Record producer, DJ
- Years active: 1989–present
- Labels: Nouveau Niveau Records, Kosmo Records, Rulin Records, Data Records, Ministry of Sound Australia
- Website: http://www.tomnovy.com

Tom Novy (born Thomas Reichold; 10 March 1970) is a DJ and producer from Munich, Germany.

== Biography ==
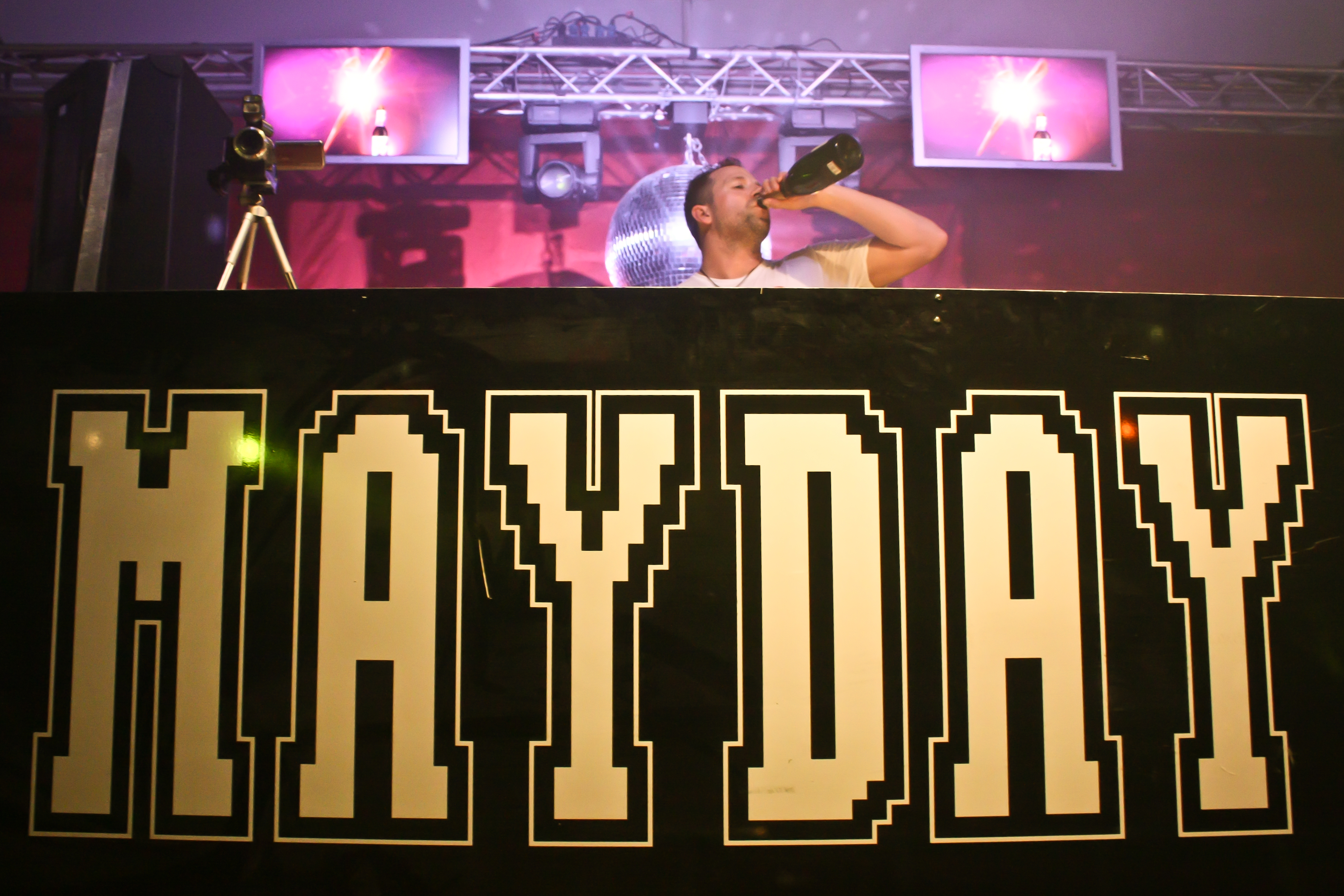
Tom Novy at Mayday 2009

Tom Novy lived in Munich in his youth and attended the Luitpold Gymnasium in Munich. In the mid-1980s he started to DJ and got his first residency at the Babalu Club.

Novy started producing music in 1994 when he signed for the Munich-based record label Kosmo Records with his first record "I House U", a cover of the Jungle Brothers' "I'll House You", with lyrics by Novy. His original tracks ran more along the subgenre of European-flavoured progressive house. Since then, Novy has moved to a Chicago-style garage house sound, usually vocalized.

Tom Novy hosted various music-related TV shows on MTV Germany (including the shows Dance Floor Charts, Streetlife, Battle of DJ's and Nightlife) and VIVA.

== Discography ==
=== Albums ===
List of albums, with selected chart positions
Title	Year	Peak chart positions	
Title	Year	GER	SWI
My Definition	2000	37	29
Superstar	2006	—	—

=== Singles ===
==== Tom Novy ====
List of singles, with selected chart positions
Title	Year	Peak chart positions				Certifications
Title	Year	GER	AUS	SWI	UK	Certifications
"I House U"	1995	—	—	—	—	
"The Odyssey" (with Afrika Islam and Vicky Culhoun)	1996	—	—	—	—	
"Creator" (The Rave & Cruise Anthem) (with Oliver Morgenroth)	1997	—	—	—	—	
"I Rock" (with Adrian Misiewicz and Virginia)	1999	48	—	—	55	
"Now or Never" (with Adrian Misiewicz and Lima)	2000	29	—	16	64	
"My Definition"	2000	—	—	—	—	
"Welcome to the Race" (with Adrian Misiewicz and Lima)	2000	—	—	83	—	
"Music Is Wonderful" (with Adrian Misiewicz and Lima)	2000	73	—	—	—	
"Back to the Streets"	2001	—	—	—	—	
"It's Over" (with Sabrynaah Pope)	2002	—	—	—	—	
"Lovin' You" (with Adrian Misiewicz)	2003	—	—	—	—	
"Without Your Love" (with Adrian Misiewicz and Lima)	2003	—	80	—	—	
"Your Body" (with Adrian Misiewicz and Michael Marshall)	2004	—	36	—	10	BPI: Silver
"Take It (Closing Time)" (with Adrian Misiewicz, Jan Krause and Lima)	2005	39	54	99	31	
"Unexpected" (with Adrian Bahil and Robin Felder)	2006	63	—	—	—	
"My House" (with Adrian Bahil and Michael Marshall)	2007	—	—	—	—	
"Transformation" (with Isma-Ae and Transform)	2008	—	—	—	—	
"Runaway" (with Adrian Bahil and Abigail Bailey)	2008	—	—	—	—	
"Fluxkompensator" (with Adrian Bahil and Abigail Bailey)	2008	—	—	—	—	
"Ziganje" (with Adrian Bahil)	2008	—	—	—	—	
"(My City Is) My Lab" (with Adrian Bahil and Sandra Nasic)	2009	—	—	—	—	
"Touch Me" (with Jerry Ropero featuring Abigail Bailey)	2009	—	—	—	—	
"I Know You Want It"	2010	—	—	—	—	
"Underground People" (with Strobe and Freakazoid)	2011	—	—	—	—	
"Can We Live" (with Toni del Gardo)	2011	—	—	—	—	
"Thelma & Luise" (with Veralovesmusic)	2011	—	—	—	—	
"Walking on the Moog"	2012	—	—	—	—	
"Tipsy Girl" (with Jashari)	2012	—	—	—	—	
"Dancing in the Sun" (with Amadeas)	2013	—	—	—	—	
"Feel It" (with Mekki Martin)	2013	—	—	—	—	
"Ohne Dich" (with Anna Deutsch)	2013	—	—	—	—	
"Time Might Tell" (with Veralovesmusic)	2014	—	—	—	—	
"Nothing Lasts Forever" (with Amadeas)	2014	—	—	—	—	
"Pumpin'"	2014	—	—	—	—	
"Fat Cat"	2014	—	—	—	—	
"Berlin Love" (with Amadeas)	2014	—	—	—	—	
"Break the Silence" (with Milkwish and Abigail Bailey)	2015	—	—	—	—	
"Flashlights" (with Veralovesmusic)	2015	—	—	—	—	
"Kiss" (with Ron Carroll)	2016	—	—	—	—	
"Closer to You" (with Milkwish and Abigail Bailey)	2016	—	—	—	—	
"Magic Happens" (with Veralovesmusic)	2017	—	—	—	—	
"I.O.U."	2019	—	—	—	—	
"Broken Dreams" (with Milkwish)	2019	—	—	—	—	

==== Novy vs. Eniac ====
List of singles with Eniac, with selected chart positions
Title	Year	Peak chart positions					
Title	Year	GER	AUS	AUT	NLD	SWI	UK
"Smoke Dis"	1998	—	—	—	—	—	—
"Superstar"	1998	27	68	30	56	25	32
"Someday > Somehow" (with Virginia)	1998	—	—	—	—	—	—
"Pumpin'"	1999	—	—	—	—	—	19

==== Other aliases ====
- 2002 "The First The Last Eternity" (2002 Mixes), as Snap! vs. Tom Novy
- 2003 "@ Work", as Supermodel DJs (with Phil Fuldner)
- 2005 "I Need Your Lovin'", as Casanovy (with Adrian Misiewicz)
- 2006 "New Dimension", as Yvonn (with Adrian Bahil and Bill Brown)
- 2006 "The Power", as Tom Novy vs. TV Rock (with TV Rock)
- 2007 "Slap That Bitch", as Tom Novy vs. JCA (with Jean-Claude Ades, Patty the Downtownprincess and Simone Anés)
- 2008 "Rhythm Is a Dancer (2008)", as Novy vs. Snap!
- 2010 "Deep in My Soul", as Tom & Jerry feat. Loredana (with Jerry Ropero)
- 2011 "Take Me to the Top", as Tom & Jerry (with Jerry Ropero)

=== Remixes ===
- 2006 Roger Sanchez - Lost (Tom Novy's Lost In Space Remix / Tom Novy's Lost In Space Dub)
- 2006 Martijn ten Velden - I Wish U Would (Tom Novy Remix)
- 2008 FilterFunk - S.O.S. (Message In A Bottle) (Tom Novy Remix)
- 2009 Snap! - Exterminate
- 2011 Fragma - Toca's Miracle (Tom Novy & Jashari Deepdown Mix)
