= Awards for world music =

Award

Various awards have been presented in recent years to musical artists for their contributions to the genre of world music. This article provides a partial list of these awards and their recipients.

== BBC Radio 3 Awards for World Music ==
The BBC Radio 3 Awards for World Music was an award given to world music artists between 2002 and 2008, sponsored by BBC Radio 3. The award was thought up by fRoots magazine's editor Ian Anderson, inspired by the BBC Radio 2 Folk Awards. Until 2006, the awards panel was chaired by Charlie Gillett and the awards shows co-ordinated by Alex Webb.

Award categories included: Africa, Asia/Pacific, Americas, Europe, Mid East and North Africa, Newcomer, Culture Crossing, Club Global, Album of the Year, and Audience Award. Initial lists of nominees in each category were selected annually by a panel of several thousand industry experts. Shortlisted nominees were voted on by a twelve-member jury, which selected the winners in every category except for the Audience Award category. These jury members were appointed and presided over by the BBC.

The annual awards ceremony was held at various venues including the Ocean in Hackney, Sage in Gateshead, the Usher Hall in Edinburgh, the Brixton Academy and finally at the BBC Proms.

In March 2009, the BBC made a decision to axe the BBC Radio 3 Awards for World Music.

== Grand Prix du Disque for World Music ==
The Grand Prix du Disque for World Music is one of a number of prizes awarded by L'Académie Charles Cros as part of the yearly Grand Prix du Disque.

== daf BAMA MUSIC AWARDS ==
The daf BAMA MUSIC AWARDS is an international multicultural music award show presented by Daf Entertainment based in Hamburg, Germany. It has been created to honor artists from all over the world and at the same time unite the world with something as beautiful as music. This award shall immortalize creativity, unity and enjoyment among the global music lovers until the end of time.

== Songlines Music Awards ==
In response to the BBC's decision to end its BBC Radio 3 Awards for World Music, the British world music magazine Songlines launched the Songlines Music Awards in 2009 "to recognise outstanding talent in world music".

== World Music Awards ==
The World Music Awards was an international awards show founded in 1989 that annually honored recording artists based on worldwide sales figures provided by the International Federation of the Phonographic Industry (IFPI). It was mainly an award for pop music and other commercially successful genres.

== Spin the Globe Best World Music CDs ==
Spin the Globe, a radio program on KAOS 89.3 FM in Olympia, Washington, compiles awards for the best global music releases each year since 2002:

- 2002 winner: Oliver Mtukudzi: Shanda Soundtrack (complete 2002 results)
- 2003 winner: Ojos de Brujo: Bari (complete 2003 results)
- 2004 winner: Lila Downs: One Blood / Una Sangre (complete 2004 results)
- 2005 winner: Gangbé Brass Band: Whendo (complete 2005 results)
- 2006 winner: Régis Gizavo, Louis Mhlanga, David Mirandon: Stories (complete 2006 results)
- 2007 winner: Kobo Town: Independence (complete 2007 results)
- 2008 winner: Ablaye Cissoko and Volker Goetze: Sira (complete 2008 results)

== See also ==
- Grammy Award for Best World Music Album
