= M.U.R. =

Lebanese liberation armed group

M.U.R. poster

M.U.R. was a Lebanese clandestine liberation armed group fighting Lebanon's occupation by foreign armies in the 1990s, after the Lebanese civil war was officially ended. The group's name was an initialism of Unified Movements of the Resistance (French: Mouvements Unis de la Résistance).

M.U.R. was founded in 1991 by Michel Elefteriades who led it until 1994. It was instigated after General Michel Aoun's defeat by the Syrian army that took control of most of Lebanon's territory. In that context, M.U.R. was an illegal organization as Lebanon's regime was under Syrian dominion.

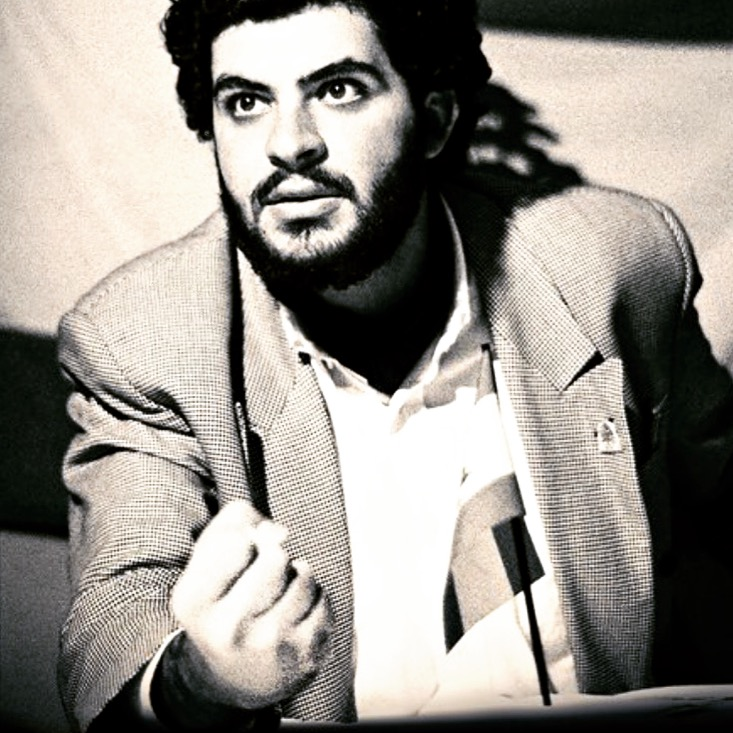
Leader of M.U.R. giving a speech

== Principles & Objectives ==
- Freeing the Lebanese territory from all foreign military presence
- Rejecting feudalism and political sectarianism in order to establish a secular democracy
- Struggling to achieve social justice
- Edifying a modern, independent and sovereign state within Lebanon’s internationally recognized boundaries
- Respecting and implementing the International Bill of Human Rights
- Fighting collaboration, treason and corruption
- Advocating the recovery of the Lebanese Army's authority over all of the land

== Internal Memos ==
Some of M.U.R.'s internal memos in 1991:

1- Fellow brother and free resistance fighters!!!

Resistance is an organized action. Planning and awareness are indispensable. Liberation is our goal.

Resistance begins with determination and joy. It is each true patriot's responsibility.

The nation is calling to get rid of occupation and its local apparatus. Their judgement hour is near...

Fellow free resistance fighters,

We know that you will answer the call, that you are strong, determined and effective.

Organize your cell. Avoid hastiness. Do not distribute despicable pamphlets.

Do not use cheap language.

Your cell is one of many that adhere to M.U.R.

The choice is yours.

See you soon and hoping for your cooperation.

From the National Committee of Resistance to the United Movements of Resistance (M.U.R.)

2- On a first step, the United Movements of Resistance (M.U.R.) will put emphasis on pamphlets as well as written slogans everywhere (walls, stickers, banners...)

We shall supply you with announcements.

You will receive well studied pamphlets that you shall photocopy and distribute on a large scale.

You shall write slogans as much as you can with a sole and unique signature: The United Movements of Resistance (M.U.R.).

The strength of our unity will bring confidence to our oppressed people and "imprisoned" army.

Traitors and enemies will fear us.

From the National Committee of Resistance to the United Movements of Resistance (M.U.R.)

3- The United Movements of Resistance or M.U.R. represents several organizations that refuse the "Etat de fait" imposed since October 13, 1990.

Our main purposes are:

• Liberate the country from all foreign occupations.

• Reject the Taif Agreements and their results.

• Reject the religious, sectarian and political feudalism.

• Fight the traitors and agents.

• Believe that the Lebanese army is our nation's hope and salvation.

• Seek the implementation of social justice.

• Respect Human Rights.

Young patriots, wake up and unite, your country needs you,

Answer to our call before it's too late,

Remember that freedom is given to those who deserve it,

Living without freedom is a form of death!

The United Movements of Aounist Resistance

M.U.R.

== Articles ==
1- An-Nahar 26-5-1992

2- An-Nahar 21-7-1992

3- An-Nahar 18-8-1992

4- An-Nahar 25-8-1992

== Michel Elefteriades ==
During this period, Michel Elefteriades is the victim of two failed assassination attempts: the first time, his car is trapped, the second, he is the target of fire. This leads him to exile in France and then in Cuba between 1994 and 1997.

In 2005, he was particularly active in the Cedar Revolution in Lebanon and in April, he organized the mega-concert of the Festival of National Unity which took place in Down Town Beirut and attracted hundreds of thousands of people celebrating this event, that some have called the Spring of Beirut or Independence 05.

The same year, in May, Elefteriades helped organize the festivities for the return of the leader Michel Aoun to Lebanon, after fifteen years of exile.
