= Bilal (name) =

Name list

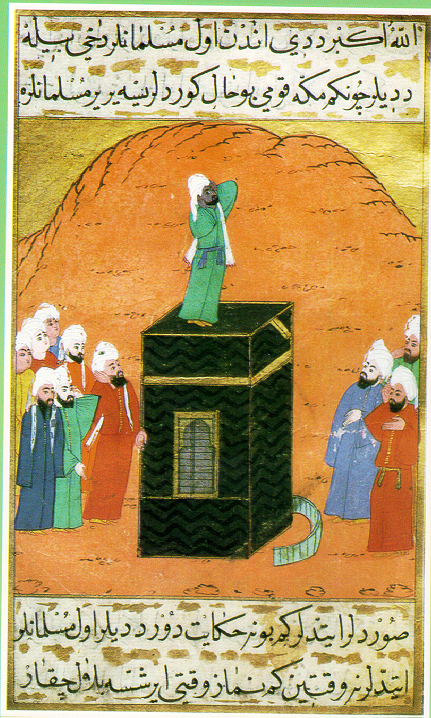
- Bilal Ibn Rabah, the first muezzin
- Pronunciation: Arabic: [bɪlaːl]
- Gender: Male
- Language: Arabic

Origin
- Meaning: "Full moon, Water, Victorious, Winner "
- Region of origin: Middle East, Africa

Other names
- Alternative spelling: Bilel, Billel, Belal, Bilaal, Belaal
- Derived: Bailul, Bailool, Baylool (Arabic: بايلول)

Bilal (Arabic: بلال Bilāl), or variants, is both a given name and a surname of Arabic/African origin. Notable people with the name include:

== Mononym ==
- Bilal ibn Rabah (580–640), companion of the Islamic prophet Muhammad
- Bilal ibn al-Harith (died 682), one of the sahaba, companion of the Islamic prophet Muhammad
- Cheb Bilal (born 1966), full name Bilal Mouffok, Algerian raï singer
- Bilal (American singer) (born 1979), American R&B/jazz singer
- Bilal (Lebanese singer) (born 1983), Lebanese gypsy singer
- Belal Mansoor Ali (born 1988), Kenyan-Bahraini distance runner

== Given name ==
- Bilal Abdullah (born 1980), British doctor behind the 2007 Glasgow International Airport attack
- Bilal Akgül (born 1982), Turkish Olympian mountain biker
- Bilal Ali (born 1951), American politician
- Bilal Asad (born 1978), Pakistani cricketer
- Billel Attafen (born 1985), Algerian football player
- Bilal Aziz Özer (born 1985), Lebanese-Turkish footballer
- Billel Benaldjia (born 1988), Algerian football player
- Bilal Coulibaly (born 2004), French basketball player
- Bilal Çubukçu (born 1987), Turkish footballer
- Bilal Duckett (born 1989), American soccer player
- Billel Dziri (born 1972), Algerian football player
- Bilal Fawaz (born 1988), UK-based Nigerian born boxer
- Bilal Gülden (born 1993), Turkish footballer
- Bilal Gurbanov (born 2006), Azerbaijani gymnast
- Bilal Haider (born 1973), Pakistani cricketer
- Bilal Hajji, Moroccan Swedish lyricist, songwriter and record producer
- Bilal Hasna (born 1999), British actor
- Bilal Hassani (born 1999), French pop singer and YouTuber
- Bilal Hussein, Iraqi photojournalist
- Bilel Ifa (born 1990), Tunisian football player
- Bilal Khan (singer) (born 1986), Pakistani singer-songwriter
- Bilal Khan (actor) (1978–2010), Pakistani television actor and model
- Bilal Khazal, Lebanese Australian suspected member of Al-Qaeda
- Bilal Kısa (born 1983), Turkish footballer
- Bilal Lashari (born 1984), Pakistani film director and cinematographer
- Bilal Macit (born 1984), Turkish politician
- Bilal Maqsood (born 1971), Pakistani pop artist and member of the Pakistani pop band Strings
- Bilal Mohammed (born 1986), Qatari football player
- Bilel Mohsni (born 1987), French-Tunisian football player
- Franck Ribéry, later known as Bilal Yusuf Mohammed (born 1983), French football player
- Bilal Moumen, (born 1990), Algerian football player
- Bilal Saad Mubarak (born 1972), Qatari shot putter
- Belal Muhammad (born 1988), American mixed martial artist
- Billel Naïli (born 1986), Algerian football player
- Bilal Najdi (born 1993), Lebanese football player
- Bilal El Najjarine (born 1981), Lebanese football player
- Bilal Najjarin (rugby league), Australian rugby league player
- Bilal Nazki (born 1947), Indian jurist
- Bilal Nichols (born 1996), American football player
- Billel Omrani (born 1993), French football player
- Bilal Orfali, Lebanese scholar of Arabic language and literature
- Bilal Ould-Chikh (born 1997), Dutch football player
- Bilal Philips (born 1947), speaker and author on Islam
- Bilal Powell (born 1988), American football running back
- Bilal Rafiq (born 1985), Pakistani footballer
- Bilal Rifaat (born 1957), Egyptian fencer
- Bilal Saeed (born 1988), Pakistani singer and songwriter
- Bilal Salaam, American singer and composer
- Bilal Shafayat (born 1984), English cricketer
- Bilal Sidibé (born 1978), Mauritanian football player
- Bilal Skaf (born 1981), Australian convicted gang rapist
- Bilal Wahib (born 1999), Dutch actor, singer and rapper
- Bilal Xhaferri (1935–1986), Albanian poet, novelist, political dissident

== Surname or family name ==
- Asmar Bilal (born 1997), American football player
- Badr Bilal (born 1962), Qatari football player
- Charles Bilal, American administrator, mayor of Kountze, Texas
- Enki Bilal (born 1951), French comic book creator, comics artist and film director
- Malika Bilal, American broadcast journalist
- Mohamed Gharib Bilal (born 1945), nuclear scientist, Chief Minister of Zanzibar
- Muhammad Ibrahim Bilal, member of a terrorist group dubbed the Portland Seven
- Muhsen Bilal (born 1944), Syrian surgeon, ambassador and politician
- Ashley Chin (born 1982), also known by his stage name Muslim Belal, British actor, screenwriter and spoken word performance poet
- Wafaa Bilal (born 1966), Iraqi American artist
