= Ojos de Brujo =

Spanish hip hop band

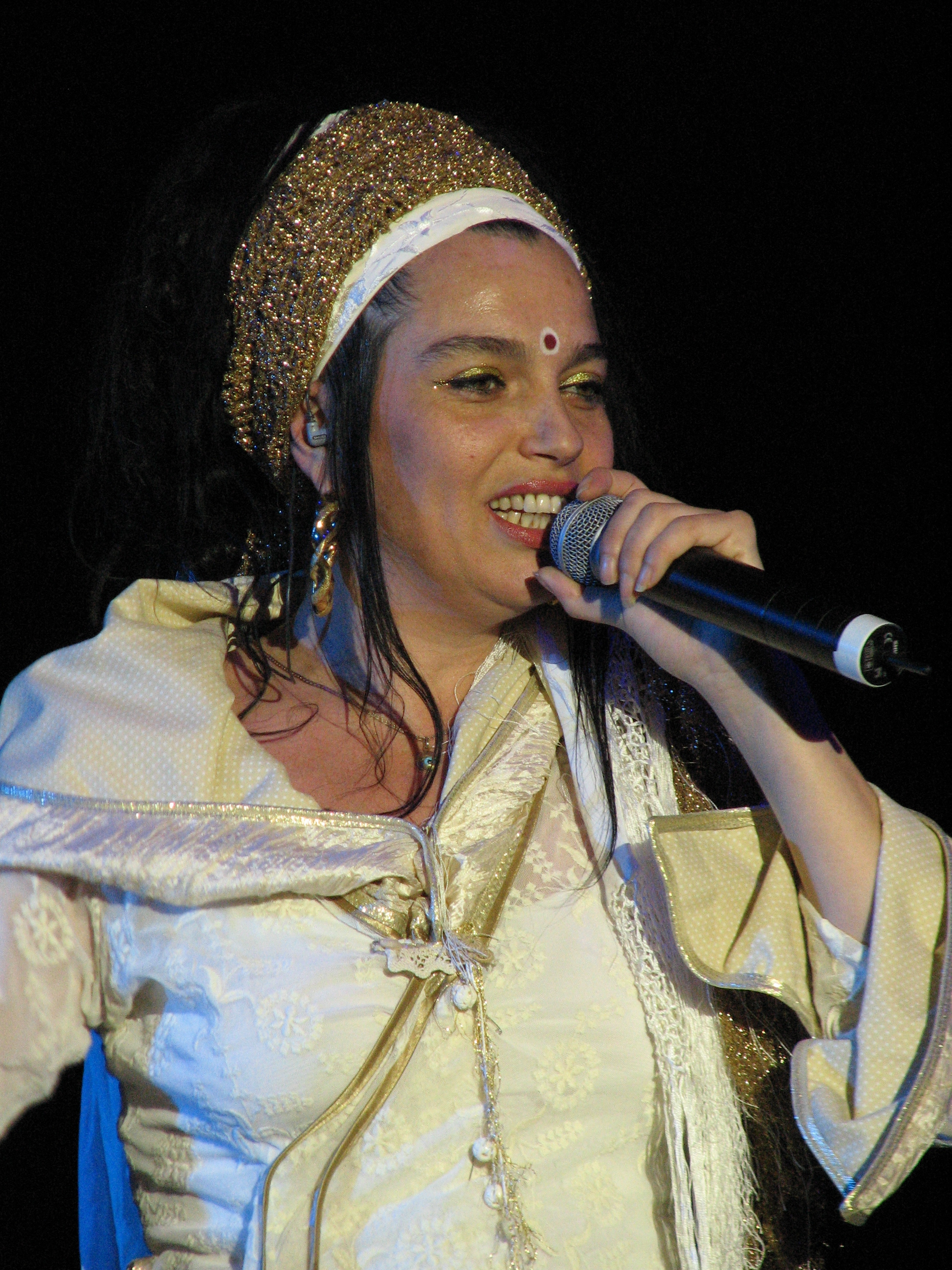
- In concert

Background information
- Origin: Spain
- Genres: Flamenco; flamenco rumba; nuevo flamenco; hip hop; world music
- Years active: 1998–2011
- Labels: Eswl; La Fábrica de Colores
- Members: Marina Abad; Ramón Giménez; Xavi Turull; DJ Panko; Sergio Ramos; Maxwell Wright; Paco Lomeňa; Javi Martin; Carlitos Sarduy

Ojos de Brujo was a nine-piece band from Barcelona who described their style as "jipjop flamenkillo" (hip hop with a little flamenco). The band sold over 100,000 copies of their self-produced Barí album and received several awards, among these the BBC Radio 3 World Music Award for Europe in 2004, having also been nominated in 2003.

Their success is also notable for being achieved without the aid of label backing. They set up their own label, La Fábrica de Colores, to get complete artistic freedom for Barí, away from the pressure they perceived from their record company Edel Records for their debut, Vengue.

== Music ==
Flamenco is clearly central to their sound; Ramón Giménez observed "the magic lies in the flamenco... that is the heartbeat of Ojos de Brujo's songs." However, they are definitely not pure flamenco. Xavi Turull said: "...we aren't trying to do flamenco. What we are doing is using the richness of flamenco and the richness of other music to build up something different. Maybe sometimes I would say that flamenco is the strongest ingredient, but we aren't trying to do flamenco." Upon the release of their first album, Vengue (1999), the flamenco fusion group did receive a lot of skepticism and criticism from the flamenco purists. Many of them refused to acknowledge that the music was true flamenco and that it strayed from its foundation, style and structure. However, according to the group, their music reflects the past of flamenco and its multicultural roots. The gypsies themselves are diverse and multicultural, a people from the Indian subcontinent, the Middle East, Eastern Europe and Iberia. Ojos de Brujo takes this same theme and blends flamenco music with the diverse musical genres of today like hip hop and pop to modernize flamenco. For example Flamenco is combined in their music with other influences including Afro-Cuban, the rap and scratching/turntablism of Hip Hop, and Indian music. The music of Ojos de Brujo uses the drama of flamenco, but carries it along on a steady rhythmic foundation, making the group's music a closer relative to rumba catalana. Usually the focus of Ojos' songs are the vocals by Marina "La Canillas" Abad, which move smoothly from gritty flamenco wail to authoritative rapping. The blend of music opens up their audience base and provides more opportunity to keep creating new types of sounds.

== Social Conscience ==
Ojos de Brujo also appeals to the youth by addressing social issues and concerns within their music. The group name, Eyes of the Sorcerer reflects this theme. According to group members, the eyes of the sorcerer look deeper into the issues and reveal the truth. Many people think that the band is named Eyes of the Witch. However, Brujo is masculine; Bruja is the Spanish for witch. Moreover, none of their songs address politics; instead many reveal current social situations in Spain. One of their songs, “Nada en la nevera” (2001), “Nothing in the Fridge,” Ojos de Brujo highlights poverty, not only in Spain but throughout the world by singing about someone who wakes up every morning to find nothing in the refrigerator. Criticizing society, in the song “Naita” the singer says, “La sangre se me rebela cuando me pongo a pensar que aquí unos tienen de tó y que otros no tienen de ná” or “My blood boils when I think that there are some who have everything and others who have nothing”. Mixing “dub, hip hop, and flamenco, just to name a few, allows Ojos de Brujo a wide range of expression. By blending flamenco and rumba, grabbing handfuls of hip hop, dub and modern-sounding drum licks and bass lines the group makes forward-looking music that could definitely have been made only in Spain and probably only in Barcelona.” Creating variety in beats, lyrics, and instruments only enhances their social and cultural message and reflects the modern and highly globalized society in which they perform.

== Members ==
- Marina "la Canillas" Abad - vocals
- Dani Carbonell - vocals, various instruments (primarily on Vengue (2001) and Barí (2002))
- Ramón Giménez - flamenco guitar
- Xavi Turull - cajón, tabla, congas, percussion
- DJ Panko - scratching
- Sergio Ramos - drums, cajón
- Maxwell Wright - percussion, vocals
- Juan Luis Leprevost Artiach - Bass (on Vengue and Barí)
- Paco Lomeña - flamenco guitar
- Javi Martin - bass, (after "Barí")
- Carlitos Sarduy - congas, trumpet, keyboard

Their CDs have also featured guest appearances by a large number of other musicians, including Nitin Sawhney and Prithpal Rajput from Asian Dub Foundation as well as many Spanish artists.

== Discography ==
- Vengue, 1999
- Rumba Dub Style (EP), 2001
- Barí, 2002
- Barí: Remezclas de la Casa, 2003
- Festimad 2003, 2003
- Techarí, 2006
- Techarí Live, 2007 (CD/DVD)
- Techarí Remixes, 2007
- Aocaná, 2009
- Corriente vital 10 años, 2010

== See also ==
- Macaco (band)
