= Bilal (Lebanese singer) =

Bilal بلال
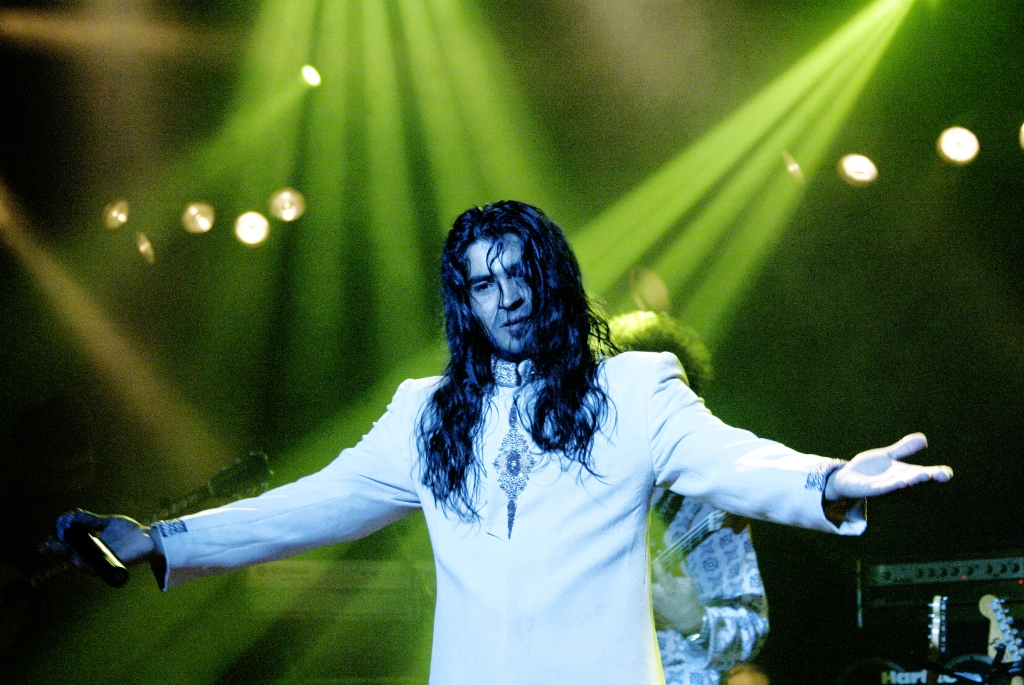

Background information
- Born: Ban Bella El Hantir (بن بلا الحنطير); 1983 (age 42–43)
- Origin: Lebanon
- Genres: Oriental Romani music
- Occupation: Singer
- Years active: 1998–present

Bilal (born 1983) is a Lebanese singer of Dom descent, who is notable for singing not only in Arabic, but mainly in Domari, his native language.

== Background ==
Ban Bella El Hantir, also known as Bilal, the Arab Gipsy Prince, comes from the Dom people, a Romani Middle Eastern ethnic group that Gadjos call the "Nawar" in Arabic. Like most nomadic Domi families, Bilal's clan constantly moves from one place to another throughout the Middle East. To earn their wage during their stops, grown up men play musical instruments and sing, and women dance and tell good fortune. As for young boys, they often work as shoeshiners in large cities such as Damascus, Beirut and Istanbul.

== Musical career ==
Bilal was a fourteen year old shoeshine boy when Greek-Lebanese producer Michel Elefteriades heard him singing an Arab-Romani song while shining a customer's shoes near his Beirut office. Elefteriades was immediately struck by his young voice and felt the artistic potential the young man had for future success. Moreover, being an eminent tziganologist, he was eager to launch a successful career for an artist who comes from the Dom community and to positively impact the image of the Roma people around the Arab world. As Bilal was illiterate and had never been to school, Elefteriades started and supported both his general and musical education, also providing him with the necessary skills and assets that would enable him to put up with the stress and responsibilities of future stardom.

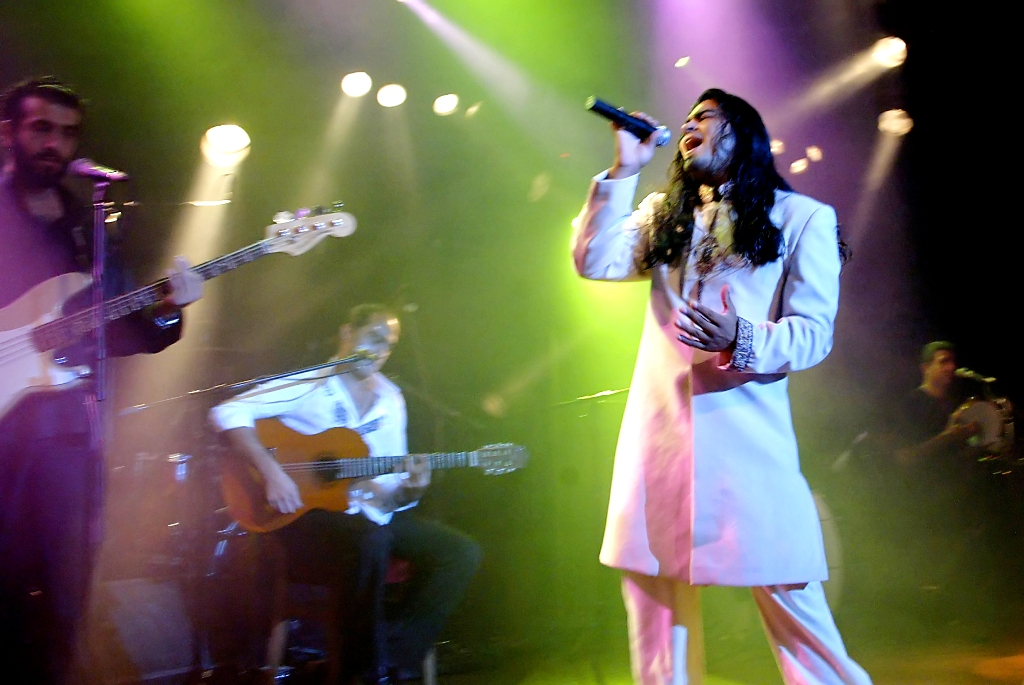
Bilal performing on stage

In 2002, Bilal started performing in concerts and was guest to major Arab TV shows on the Middle East's prime satellite television networks. The peak of his success story was his appearance at one of the most prestigious performing arts festival in the Arab world, the Baalbeck International Festival. Bilal's recordings include, for the first time in history, songs in the language known as Domari

In 2012 Bilal was a guest on Coke Studio (Middle East) alongside Rouwaida Attieh and The Yugoslavian Gypsy Brass Band from the Balkans. They all came together to create a fusion of Oriental Tarab music and the Romani music.

In 2014 Bilal was featured in the book "Beirut Re-Collected" by Tamyras.

In the summer of 2014, Bilal released his first album entitled: Bilal The Gipsy Prince.

In the summer of 2016, he performed at the Music Hallogy Festival, which was held at The Music Hall Waterfront.

== Activism ==
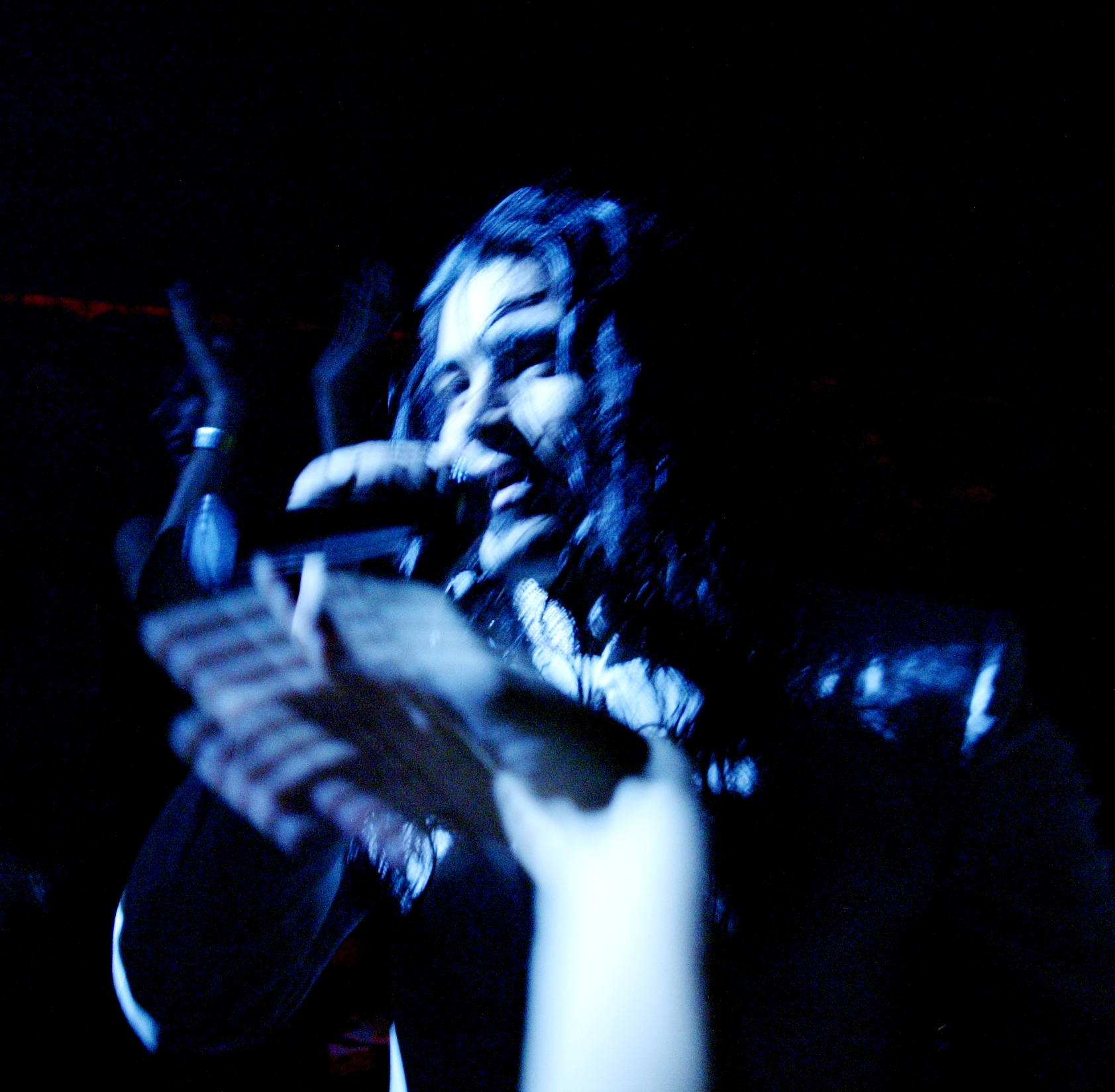
Bilal interacting with audience

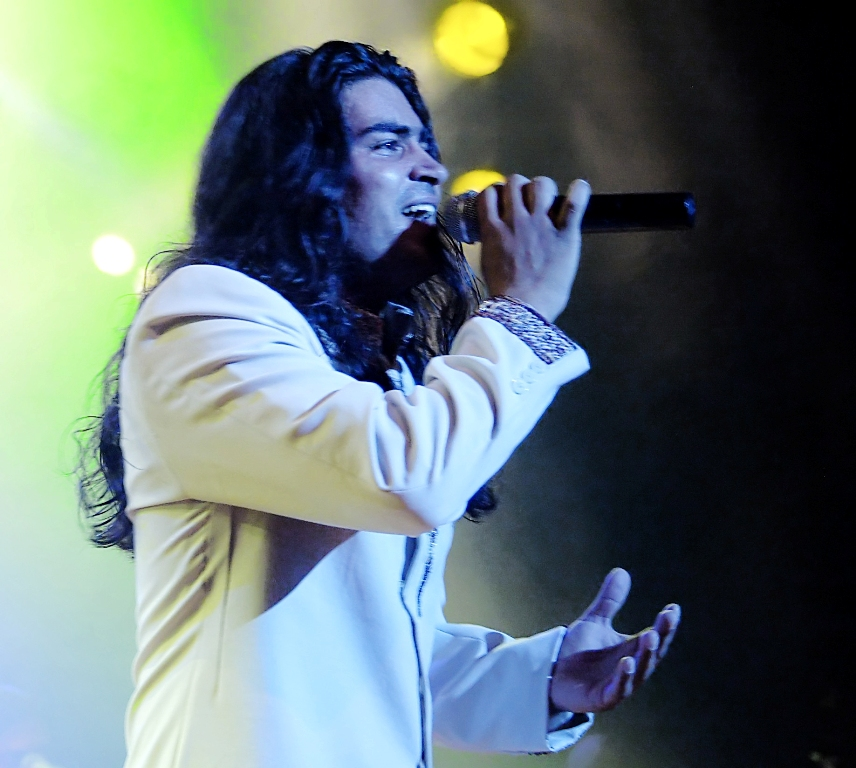
Bilal

In addition to being an artist, Bilal is also working actively for the recognition of his people, the Dom, who still live in poor conditions. Results of his struggle are starting to show, as more people are realizing that the "Nawar" have a rich cultural heritage that deserves to be known and recognized.
