= Jerry Ropero =

- Also known as: Avantgarde, NBG, Avenida; JR
- Born: Jerry Ropero Verlackt; May 11, 1971 (age 55); Antwerp, Belgium
- Genre: House
- Occupations: DJ, producer, songwriter
- Labels: Interlabel Music Germany, Gimmify Corporation, Bercall GmbH, www.jerryropero.info (Entrepreneur)

Jerry Ropero (born as Jerry Ropero Verlackt; May 11, 1971) is a Belgian-born Spanish house music DJ, producer, songwriter and publisher.

Ropero is a son of Paco Paco, who scored a hit in 1973 with "Taka Taka Tá" and grandchild of Al Verlane, a Belgian jazz musician. He is the older brother of Timmy Ropero, also a musician in Spain.

== Early career ==
Ropero's career began in the 1990s in Belgium, when he joined the group Natural Born Grooves. He released his first two tracks under his own name, "All Over" and "Drive", in 1996. His earliest mainstream success came in 1999, when he released, together with DJ Maui and Terri Bjerre aka Terri B!- known together as Avant Garde, the track Get Down, which peaked at position 12 in Billboard's Hot Dance Club Play chart, and stayed on that chart for 13 weeks. The group released their second single two years later, in 2001, titled "Don't Stop", which didn't achieve the same success as the group's debut. Later in 2004 they released a maxi single titled "Get Down (Again)" containing new remixes to their old classic.

== After Avant Garde ==
After Avant Garde, Ropero continued publishing music under his own name, releasing his music under several labels, most notably Positiva and Joia, but most of his work has been remixing for other artists, such as Danzel, and Kate Ryan. Most of his mainstream success since Avant Garde has however resulted from collaborating with Denis The Menace, another German-born DJ/producer, under several different aliases (Michael Simon, JR & DTM, Avalanche, Clubworxx, among others), together producing remixes as well as their own material, such as Coração, Mombasa, and Time 2 Turn Around. Their work has been included on several compilations released by some of the biggest labels in the house scene, including Ministry of Sound and Hed Kandi.

== Discography ==
=== Singles ===
- "All Over" (1996)
- "Drive" (1996)
- "Nite & Day" (2002)
- "Home Alone" (2006)
- "Ocean Drums" (2006)
- "The Storm" (featuring Cozi Costi) (2006)
- "Videoscream" (2006)
- "Berimbau" (2007)
- "Music" (2007)
- "Bangladesh" (2008)
- "Let Me Be Your Fantasy" (with Stephan Gruenwald and AnnaMaria) (2008)
- "Organ of Love (Want Love)" (2008)

=== Selected remixes ===
- Influence - Funky (Jerry Ropero & Jams Personal Edit) (1997)
- Groove Masters - Just A Little Bit (DJ Jams & Jerry Ropero X-Tended) (1997)
- Latin Thing - I Will Follow (Open Minds Club Vocal Mix) (1998)
- Spanic - Such Is Life (DJ Jams & Jerry Ropero Full Intention Mix) (1998)
- Negrocan - Cada Vez (Jerry Ropero's Avant Garde Remix) (2000)
- Kitch - Cosmic Distance (Jerry Ropero's Avantgarde Mix) (2000)
- Cherubia - Devil In Disguise (Jerry, Michael & Miko's Hard Dub Mix) (2000)
- Cherubia - Devil In Disguise (Jerry, Michael & Miko's Hard Vocal Mix) (2000)
- Cherubia - Devil In Disguise (Jerry, Michael & Miko's Full Vocal Mix) (2000)
- House Of Glass - Disco Down (J. Ropero & M. Simon Mix) (2000)
- Afterfive - Get Down (And Boogie) (Jerry Ropero's Avant Garde Remix) (2000)
- B-15 Project - Girls Like Us (J Ropero & M Simon Remix) (2000)
- Noname - Off (Jerry Ropero & Michael Simon 2nite Mix) (2000)
- Paps 'n' Skar - Turn Around (Jerry Ropero Club Mix) (2000)
- Paps 'n' Skar - Turn Around (Jerry Ropero Instrumental Club Mix) (2000)
- Onionz & Master D - TZ's Tango (Jerry Ropero's Avant Garde Mix) (2000)
- Orphean - My People (Jerry Ropero Mix) (2001)
- Dax Riders - People (Todd & Jerry Ropero Mix) (2001)
- Sound Of Pink - Everybody Knows... (Jerry Ropero & Timo Milewski Rmx) (2002)
- Sound Of Pink - Everybody Knows... (Avant Garde vs Sandro Sandrino Rmx) (2002)
- Giorgio - Tanga (Jerry Ropero & Sandrino Remix) (2002)
- Aguero - Malembe (Jerry Ropero & Sandro Sandrino Club Mix) (2003)
- DJ Antoine - Back & Forth (DJ Squad vs. Jerry Ropero Avantgarde 303 Mix) (2004)
- DJ Antoine - Back & Forth (DJ Squad vs. Jerry Ropero Avantgarde Mix) (2004)
- Avalanche - Everybody Sing (Jerry Ropero's Avant Garde Mix) (2004)
- Avant Garde - Get Down (Again) (Jerry Ropero's Avantgarde Mix) (2004)
- Mendoça Do Rio - Magalenha (Jerry Ropero's Avantgarde & Sandro Sandrino Mix) (2004)
- I.K.L. Vs. Amygdala - Paixao (Jerry Ropero's "Avantgarde" Mix) (2004)
- Danzel - Pump It Up! (Jerry Ropero & Dennis The Menace Remix) (2004)
- Raw Style - All Day And All Of The Night (Jerry Ropero Remix) (2005)
- Geraldo Feat. Dennis LeGree - Caribbean Queen (Jerry Ropero's Pumpin' Mix) (2005)
- Anneke van Hooff - Give (Jerry Ropero Mix) (2005)
- Jon Smith & Mark Wilcox Love Changes (Everything) (Jerry Ropero vs Supernova Dub Mix) (2005)
- Sweet Coffee - Special Kind Of Feeling (Jerry Ropero Remix) (2005)
- Oliver Backens & Stefan Günwald - Alive (Jerry Ropero Remix) (2006)
- The Shapeshifters - Incredible (Denice The Mence & Jerry Ropero Dubmental Mix) (2006)
- Sami Dee & Freddy Jones vs. Crystal Waters - Gypsy Woman 2006 (La-Da-Dee) (Jerry Ropero Remix) (2006)
- Carnival - Not Over Yet (Jerry Ropero Remix) (2006)
- Big World Presents Swen G - Morning Light (Jerry Ropero Remix) (2006)
- Brainbug - Nightmare (The 2nd Chapter) (Jerry Ropero vs. Clubworxx Remix) (2006)
- TJM - Small Circle Of Friends (Jerry Ropero & Michael Simon Re-Broke Remix) (2006)
- TJM - Small Circle Of Friends (JR & MS Gramm In Package Remix) (2006)
- Wawa - Sunshine (Jerry Ropero Back To Basics Mix) (2006)
- Royal Gigolos - Tell It To My Heart (Jerry Ropero Remix) (2006)
- Funky Monkeys - The Beat Conductor (Jerry Ropero Remix) (2006)
- Patric La Funk - You Never Know (Jerry Ropero Remix) (2007)
- Bel Amour - Bel Amour 2007 (Jerry Ropero & Michael Simon Remix) (2007)
- Steve'n King - Bounce (Jerry Ropero vs. Michael Simon Remix) (2007)
- Tiësto Feat. BT - Break My Fall (Jerry Ropero vs NBG Afterhours Remix) (2007)
- Dada Feat. Sandy Rivera & Trix - Lollipop (Jerry Ropero Remix) (2007)
- Syke 'n' Sugarstarr - Danz (Jerry Ropero Remix) (2007)
- Natural Born Grooves - Groovebird (Jerry Ropero Remix) (2007)
- Terri B* Vs. Jerry Ropero - Hands To The Sky (Jerry Ropero Remix) (2007)
- Ian Carey Feat. Michelle Shellers - Keep On Rising (Jerry Ropero Remix) (2007)
- D.O.N.S & DBN Feat. Kadoc - The Nighttrain (Jerry Ropero Remix) (2007)
- Ernesto Vs. Bastian - Unchained Melody (Jerry Ropero Remix) (2007)
- Cafe Groove - Why You Wanna Do Me Wrong (Denis The Menace & Jerry Ropero's Club Mix) (2007)
- Michi Lange - Brothers And Sisters (Jerry Ropero Remix) (2008)
- Kate Ryan - Ella Elle L'a (Jerry Ropero Bigroom Remix) (2008)
- The House Keepers - Hangin' On (Jerry Ropero & Michi Lange Remix) (2008)
- Voltaxx & Lissat - House Music (Jerry Ropero Mix) (2008)
- Alexander Marcus - Papaya (Jerry Ropero & Michi Lange Remix) (2008)
- Nick Nite Vs. Tex Mex - Mexico (Keep Movin' Keep Groovin - Denis The Menace & Jerry Ropero Remix) (2008)
- Tom Novy Feat. Abigail Bailey - Runaway (Jerry Ropero Remix) (2008)
- Mike Di Scala & Colin Airey - Space & Time (Jerry Ropero Mix) (2008)
- Dance 2 Trance - Power Of American Natives 2009 (Jerry Ropero Mix) (2009)
- Dance 2 Trance - Power Of American Natives 2009 (Jerry Ropero Radio Version) (2009)
- Lian Ross - Young Hearts Run Free (Jerry Ropero Remix) (2013)
- Jerry Ropero feat. Miss Ingrid - Pipl mast trast as (Croatia raving in EU mix) (2013)
