= Puntilla Music =

- Founded: 2021; 5 years ago
- Founder: Claudio Pairot
- Genre: Latin
- Country of origin: United States, Cuba
- Location: Miami, Florida, U.S.
- Official website: Official website

Puntilla Music is a record label, digital music distributor, music publisher, and rights management company based in Miami, Florida. Founded in 2021 by Cuban musician Claudio Pairot, it releases recordings, distributes digital music, administers music publishing rights, and manages music catalogues.

== History ==
Puntilla Music was previously known as Puntilla Films and transitioned to Puntilla Music in 2021, offering music distribution, publishing, and label services. The company had previously entered into a joint venture with Cuban recording studio MusicaDoy in 2020. The first release from the partnership was Epicentro, the debut studio album by Cuban singer Dale Pututi.

Puntilla Music has distributed recordings by artists including Fonseca, Leoni Torres, Marc Anthony, Pablo Milanés, Bomba Estereo, Voz Veis, Chino y Nacho, San Luis, Tito Nieves, Gilberto Santa Rosa, Alexis Valdés, Haydée Milanés, Pablo Milanés, David Calzado, Gente De Zona, Voz Veis, Guaco, and La Charanga Habanera.

The company signed distribution agreements with live-session music projects, including Sesiones Desde La Loma in 2024, and Free Cover Venezuela in 2025.

In 2025, Ricardo Chamberlain joined Puntilla Music as chief operating officer. Puntilla Music was also represented at BIME Bogotá, where artists distributed by the company were included in the event's music program.

== Distribution ==
Puntilla Music provides digital distribution, music publishing administration, rights management, and royalty collection services for artists and music catalogues. The company distributes recordings through digital music platforms and manages music catalogues for artists and rights holders.

Its catalogue includes releases by Leoni Torres, Dale Pututi, Laritza Bacallao, Los 4, Nesty, Alexis Valdés, Haydée Milanés, Pablo Milanés, and David Calzado's La Charanga Habanera, among others.

== Selected releases ==
Year	Title	Artist	Format	Notes
2016	Se Acabó	Chino y Nacho, SanLuis	Music video	Distributed by Puntilla Music
2018	Simples Corazones	Fonseca	Music video	Distributed by Puntilla Music
2020	Epicentro	Dale Pututi	Studio album	First release issued through the MusicaDoy joint venture
2020	Alma Cubana	Leoni Torres	Studio album	Released by Puntilla Music
2020	Nunca Te Vayas	Leoni Torres	Music video	Directed by Carlos Enrique Almirante and produced by Puntilla Music
2020	Que hablen	Laritza Bacallao	Studio album	Released by Puntilla Music
2020	Roniel Alfonso y Son del XXI Orchestra	Julio Roniel Alfonso Mella and Son del XXI Orchestra	Studio album	Released by Puntilla Music
2020	Recordándote	Leoni Torres and El Micha	Single	Produced by Daneon. Musical production credits include Leoni Torres, Kelvis Ochoa, and Leonardo Gil Milián. Released by Puntilla Music
2020	Feliz Navidad (2020) Salsa Remix	Various artists	Single	Released by Puntilla Music
2021	Segundo Plato	Voz Veis	Single	Distributed by Puntilla Music
2022	Canten	Leoni Torres	EP	Released by Puntilla Music. was nominated for a Latin Grammy Award in 2022 under the Best Traditional Tropical Album category.
2022	Lágrimas de Champán	Gente de Zona, Dale Pututi, El Carli	Single	Distributed by Puntilla Music
2023	Corazón roto	Leoni Torres	Single	Released by Puntilla Music
2024	Salsa de Ahora	Motiff, Various Artists	Album	Distributed by Puntilla Music. Featuring collaborations with Luis Figueroa, Jimmy Rodríguez, Jonathan Moly, Nesty, Ronald Borjas.
2025	Bingo	Alain Pérez	Album	Distributed by Puntilla Music. Featuring collaborations with Gilberto Santarosa, Luis Enrique, Issac Delgado, Tito Nieves

== Select artists ==
- Alain Pérez
- Amber Donoso
- Beangel
- Carlos Nevárez
- Carlos Varela
- Clan 537
- Claudia Soria
- Dale Pututi
- Descemer Bueno
- Diana Fuentes
- DJ Unic
- El Chacal
- El Chulo
- El Micha
- El Taiger
- El Yonki
- Elito Revé
- Free Cover Venezuela
- Fonseca
- Gardi
- Gerardo Rivas
- Gente de Zona
- Haila
- Jimmy Rodríguez
- Jotabarrioz
- La Dimensión Latina
- Laritza Bacallao
- Lenier
- Leoni Torres
- Los 4
- Los Van Van
- Marc Anthony
- Motiff
- Mayor Tom
- Nesty
- Nikki Alva
- Nino Augustine
- Norbert
- Omi Hernández
- Randy Malcom
- Rafa Tena
- Roniel Alfonso
- Sesiones Desde La Loma
- X Alfonso
- Yissy García
- Orquesta Aragon

== Recognition ==
Recordings released/distributed by Puntilla Music have received nominations from music industry organizations. Leoni Torres's album Alma Cubana received a nomination for Best Traditional Tropical Album at the Latin Grammy Awards. His album Canten – A Tribute to Polo Montañez (2022) received a second consecutive nomination at the Latin Grammy Awards.

Orquesta Aragón's album Ícono was nominated for Best Traditional Tropical Album at the 2020 Latin Grammy Awards and won the category.

Alain Pérez's album Bingo was nominated for Best Tropical Latin Album at the 2025 Latin Grammy Awards and was also nominated for Best Tropical Latin Album at the 2026 Grammy Awards.

Recordings distributed by Puntilla Music have received certifications from the Recording Industry Association of America (RIAA).
