= Antilliaanse Feesten =

Annual Belgian music festival of Caribbean music

Antilliaanse Feesten is a Caribbean music festival that takes place in every second weekend of August in Hoogstraten, Belgium. It had 38,000 attendees in 2016. The festival was first held in 1983, and has been repeated every year except 2000.

The artists presents music from different countries and genres: Bachata, Champeta, Cumbia, Compas, Merengue, Dancehall, Reggae, Reggaeton, Salsa, Ska, Soca, Soukous, Timba, Vallenato and Zouk

== Program / Line Up ==
=== 2018 ===
Acido Pantera • Electronic Latin | Colombia - Broederliefde • Reggaeton | Nederland - Carlyn Xp • Soca | Dominica - Carmel Zoum • African Dancehall | France/Congo - Ce'cile • Dancehall | Jamaïca - Charles King • Champeta | Colombia - Daddy Yankee • Reggaeton | Puerto Rico - David Kada • Salsa | Dominicaanse Republiek - Descemer Bueno • Latin Music | Cuba - Diblo Dibala • Soukous | Kongo - Eddy Kenzo • Happy African Music For Dancing | Uganda - Ephrem J • Bachata | Curaçao - Gentz • Salsa, Merengue And Kizomba | Curaçao - Grupo Niche • Salsa | Colombia - Jacob Desvarieux • Zouk | Guadeloupe - Kaï (Ex Carimi) • Compas | Haïti - Kumbia Boruka • Kumbia | Mexico, France - Nelson Freitas • Kizomba | Kaapverdië - Original Burning Flames • Soca | Antigua - Tabou Combo • Compas | Haïti - The Dubbeez • Reggae | Nederland - Troy • Dancehall | Cuba - Zalama Crew • Hip Hop | Colombia

=== 2017 ===
Baby Lores • Cubaton | Cuba - Baloji • Soukous | Belgium, Congo - Blend Mishkin • Reggae | Greece - Divan • Cubaton | Cuba - Doble R • Classical Latin | Curaçao - El Mura Y Su Timbre Latino • Timba, Salsa | Cuba - Farmer Nappy • Soca | Trinidad En Tobago - Fruko y sus Tesos • Colombian Salsa | Colombia - Grupo Extra • Bachata | Zwitserland, Dominican Republic - Impact • Reggae, Jazz, House | Nederland - J Alvarez • Reggaeton | Puerto Rico - Kassav' • Zouk | Guadeloupe - Kd Soundsystem • Dancehall, Kuduro | Nederland - Kenny B • Reggaeton | Nederland, Suriname - La Dame Blanche • Dancehall, Hip Hop, Dancehall, Reggae | Cuba - La Inédita • Cumbia, Raggamuffin | Peru - Lina Ice • Reggaeton | Nederland - Marvay • Soca | Barbados - Michel “El Buenón” • Salsa | Dominican Republic - Pegasaya • Salsa Showband | Nederland - Rebels Band • Soca | St. Eustatius - Shaggy • Reggae & Dancehall | Jamaica - Twister El Rey • Champeta (Soukous, Compass, Zouk, Soca, Calipso) | Colombia - Wilfrido Vargas • Merengue | Dominican Republic - Young Cosje • Kaseko | Suriname

=== 2016 ===
- 12 August 2016
  - La-33 - Salsa (Colombia)
  - Frank Reyes - Bachata (Dominican Republic)
  - Kinito Mendez - Merengue (Dominican Republic)
  - Locomondo - Reggae, Ska (Greece)
  - Rupee - Soca (Barbados)
  - Troy Y La Familia - Salsa, Timba (Cuba)
  - Nd - Soukous (Congo)
  - Pegasaya - Salsa, Merengues, Bachata (Nederland)
  - B.M.W. (Brothers Making Wisdom) - Soca & Reggae (Aruba)
  - Nastyplay - Bachata & Zouk (Nederland)
  - New Style - Julie Music (Suriname)
  - Systema Solar - Colombian Afro Reggaeton, Cumbia, Champeta) (Colombia)
  - Zwartwerk - Hip Hop, Zouk, Kuduro (Belgium, Angola, Congo)
- 13 August 2016
  - Oscar D'leon - Salsa (Venezuela)
  - Alexander Abreu & Havana D'primera - Salsa (Cuba)
  - Diblo Dibala - Soukous At Its Best !!! (Congo)
  - Tizzy & El A Kru - Soca (Antigua & Barbuda)
  - B.M.W. (Brothers Making Wisdom) - Soca & Reggae (Aruba)
  - Broederliefde - Reggaeton (Nederland)
  - Cache Royale - Latin Showband (Curaçao)
  - Ephrem J - Bachata (Curaçao)
  - Los Desiguales - Latin Pop (Cuba)
  - Postmen - Hip-Hop Reggaeton (Nederland)
  - Typhoon - Rap - Nederlands (Surinam)
  - Young F - Reggaeton (Colombia)

=== 2015 ===
- 7 August 2015
  - Grupo Niche - Salsa (Colombia)
  - Kes The Band - Reggae (Trinidad En Tobago)
  - Silvestre Dangond - Vallenato (Colombia)
  - Mr. Vegas - Rasta, Reggae (Jamaica)
  - Tizzy & El a Kru - Soca (Trinidad and Tobago)
  - Popcaan - Dancehall (Jamaica)
  - Laritza Bacallao - Cubaton (Cuba)
  - Bazurto All Stars - Congolese Soukous (Colombia)
  - Chacal Y Yakarta - Cubaton, Reggaeton (Cuba)
  - Hollie Cook - Ska, Reggae (United Kingdom)
  - Kankantrie - Rhythms Of Central-Afrika (Surinam)
  - Gato Preto - Kuduro With Rhytims From Afrika (Mozambique, Ghana)
  - Napalma - Electro (Mozambique, Brasil)
- 8 August 2015
  - Haila - Musica Cubana (Cuba)
  - El Adolescent's Reencuentro - Salsa (Venezuela)
  - Henry Mendez - Merengue, Reggaeton (Dominican Republic)
  - Toby Love - Bachata (Dominican Republic)
  - Merengue All Stars - Mambo, Merengue (Dominican Republic, USA)
  - El Micha - Cubaton, Salsa (Cuba)
  - Cache Royale - Salsa Showband (Curaçao)
  - Rebels Band - Soca (St. Eustatius)
  - Ghetto Flow - Reggaeton (Nederland)
  - La Dame Blanche - Hip Hop Cumbia (Cuba)
  - Satisfaction - Calypso, Soca (Aruba)
  - Extazz - Salsa, Merengue Showband (Nederland)
  - Septeto Nabori - Musica Cubana (Cuba)

=== 2014 ===
- 8 August 2014
  - Osmani Garcia - Reggaeton (Cuba)
  - Grupo Galé - Salsa (Colombia)
  - Fay-Ann Lyons (Trinidad)
  - Kassav & Guests - Zouk (Zoukmachine, Luc Leandry, Jean-Marc Ferdinand) (Guadeloupe, Martinique)
  - Salsa Celtica (Scotland)
  - Duban Bayona & Jimmy Zambrano (Colombia)
  - La Z-One - Soukous (Belgium)
  - B.M.W. (Aruba)
  - Kollision Band (St.Kitts & Nevis)
  - Grupo Extra (Dominican Republic)
- 9 August 2014
  - N'klabe - Salsa (Puerto Rico)
  - Fuego - Merengue (Dominican Republic)
  - Gente D'zona - Reggaeton (Cuba)
  - Bunji-Garlin - Soca (Trinidad)
  - Burning Flames - Soca (Antigua)
  - Carimi Ft Mikabem - Compas (Haïti, USA)
  - Palenka Soultribe - electronic sounds with Afro-Colombian rhythms and melodies (Colombia)
  - The Skints - Reggae(United Kingdom)
  - Aptijt (Suriname)
  - Herencia De Timbiqui (Colombia)
  - Mr. Black (Colombia)
  - David Kada (Dominican Republic)

=== 2013 ===
- 9 August 2013
  - Daddy Yankee
  - Guayacan
  - Cubaton All Stars
  - Fulanito
  - Rikki Jai
  - The Selecter
  - Kumbia Queers
  - Rebels Band
  - Bomba Estéreo
  - Freddy Loco feat. Vin Gordon
- 10 August 2013
  - Kassav'
  - Kes the Band
  - Ce'cile
  - Charanga Habanera
  - Jimmy Saa
  - Azucar Negra
  - RKM Y KEN-Y
  - Shakalewa
  - Kuenta y Tambú (KIT)
  - Staff des Leaders
  - Grupo Extra
  - Kevin Florez

=== 2012 ===
- 10 August 2012
  - 20:45 Morgan Heritage
  - 22:45 Henry Santos (Aventura)
  - 00:45 Carimi
  - 02:45 Havana D'Primera
  - 20:15 Bella Mondo
  - 22:15 Celso Piña
  - 00:15 Ferre Gola
  - 02:15 Destra Garcia
  - 20:45 Recruitz Soca Band
  - 23:00 Locomondo
  - 01:15 KLC Clave Cubana
- 11 August 2012
  - 19:45 Tony Dize
  - 21:30 Diomedes Diaz
  - 23:15 Luis Enrique
  - 01:30 Destra Garcia
  - 03:30 Konata
  - 20:00 La Fiesta & Kayente
  - 22:00 Locomondo
  - 00:15 Kola Loka
  - 02:15 Angeles Bendecidos
  - 21:00 Xamanek
  - 23:15 Staff des Leaders
  - 01:30 Punky Donch

=== 2011 ===
- 12 August 2011
  - 20:45 Silvio Mora
  - 22:45 Yuri Buenaventura
  - 01:00 Don Omar
  - 02:45 Roy Cape All Stars
  - 20:15 Damaru & App'tijt
  - 22:15 Choc Quib Town
  - 00:15 Kewdy de los Santos
  - 02:00 Yumuri
  - 21:00 Kuenta y Tambú (KIT)
  - 23:15 El Micha
  - 01:30 Rebels Band
- 13 August 2011
  - 19:45 Alex Bueno
  - 21:30 Werrason
  - 23:15 Grupo Galé
  - 01:15 Machel Montano
  - 03:30 Rebels Band
  - 20:15 Punky Donch
  - 22:15 Roy Cape All Stars
  - 00:30 Queen Ifrica & Tony Rebel
  - 02:30 Manolin "El Medico de la Salsa"
  - 21:00 Sonambulo
  - 23:15 La Pinata
  - 01:30 Solo Dos

=== 2010 ===
- 13 August 2010
  - 19:45 K-Liber
  - 21:00 Willy Chirino
  - 23:00 Mr. Vegas
  - 01:00 Wyclef Jean
  - 02:45 Triple Kay
  - 21:30 Los 4
  - 23:30 Tizzy & El a Kru
  - 01:15 Maykel Blanco
  - 21:00 Cumbia Cosmonauts
  - 23:15 Young Livity
  - 01:30 B.M.W.
- 14 August 2010
  - 20:30 Michel Batista
  - 22:45 Los Rabanes ft. Osvaldo Ayala
  - 01:00 Jorge Celedon
  - 03:00 Tizzy & El a Kru
  - 20:00 Triple Kay
  - 22:00 Gwatinik. feat. Tina Ly
  - 00:15 Toby Love
  - 02:30 La Rouge
  - 21:00 La Monareta
  - 23:15 Rebels Band
  - 01:30 Grupo Extra

=== 2009 ===
- 14 August 2009
  - 20:30 Alex Bello
  - 22:15 Magia Caribena
  - 00:30 Carlos Vives
  - 02:30 Bamboolaz
  - 21:45 Desorden Publico
  - 23:45 Destra Garcia
  - 02:00 Havana D'Primera
  - 21:15 Staff des Leaders
  - 22:45 DJ Saca la Mois
  - 23:30 KLC Clave Cubana
  - 00:45 DJ Saca la Mois
  - 01:30 Youth X-treme
  - 03:00 DJ Eduardo
- 15 August 2009
  - 20:15 Michael Stuart
  - 22:00 Milly Quezada
  - 23:45 Kassav'
  - 01:30 Tego Calderon
  - 03:00 Destra Garcia
  - 19:30 App'tijt
  - 21:30 Elito Revé
  - 23:45 Aimelia Lias
  - 02:00 Youth X-treme
  - 21:00 Sindicato Sonico
  - 22:30 DJ Saca la Mois
  - 23:15 Pannonia Allstars Ska Orchestra
  - 00:45 DJ Saca la Mois
  - 01:30 Bomba Estéreo
  - 03:00 DJ Mystique

=== 2008 ===
Entry per day : €35 Entry per weekend, €55

The festival organization co-organized the Marc Anthony concert on June 19 at Sportpaleis in Antwerp.

- Grupo Galé (salsa colombienne)
- Monchy Y Alexandra (bachata)
- Wisin y Yandel (reggaetón)
- Gente d'Zona (reggaetón)
- Carimi (kompa)
- Binomio de Oro (vallenato)
- Chichi Peralta
- Maravilla de Florida
- Djunny Claude
- Magia Caribena
- 3 Canal
- Small Axe Band
- T-Strong
- Rodry-Go
- Rocola Bacalao
- ATNG Soca Band

=== 2007 ===
- La India
- Charanga Habanera
- Monchy Y Alexandra
- Kassav'
- N'Klabe
- Joe Arroyo
- Pitbull
- Oro Solido
- Karamelo Santo
- Haila y su Orquesta
- Eddy-K
- Le Groove
- Machel Montano
- J-F Ifonge
- Combinatie XVI
- Inner Visions
- Ghetto Flow
- BMW Plus

=== 2006 ===
- 11 August 2006
  - 21:30 Los Corraleros de Majagual
  - 23:30 Orishas
  - 01:30 Issac Delgado
  - 21:30 Triple Kay
  - 23:30 Youth X-treme
  - 01:30 DJ Chen
  - 20:30 App'tijt
  - 22:30 Willie Colon
  - 00:30 Magic System
  - 02:30 T-Vice
- 12 August 2006
  - 19:45 BMW
  - 21:30 Magia Caribena
  - 22:30 Krezi Mizik
  - 01:30 La 33
  - 21:30 Bambu Station
  - 22:30 Immo
  - 01:30 J-F Ifonge
  - 20:30 Paulo Fg y su Elite
  - 22:30 Amarfis y su bande de Attakke
  - 00:30 Jerry Rivera
  - 02:45 Triple Kay

Indoor Festival 2006

- 18 mars 2006
  - 22:00 Kassav'
  - 23:30 Elvis Crespo
  - 01:00 Los Van Van

=== 2005 ===
- 12 August 2005
  - 20:30 Wezon
  - 22:30 Johnny Pacheco
  - 00:30 Carimi
  - 02:30 Victor Manuelle
  - 20:00 New System Brass
  - 21:30 Osvaldo Ayala
  - 23:30 Era
  - 01:30 Pablo Bachata
  - 21:30 Midnight Groovers
  - 22:30 Mark Foggo Skasters

ù13 August 2005

  - 20:30 Carimi
  - 22:30 Don Omar
  - 00:30 Rikarena
  - 02:30 Wezon
  - 19:45 Panteon Rococo
  - 21:30 Midnight Groovers
  - 23:30 Los Gigantes Del Vallenato
  - 01:30 Salsa Celtica
  - 21:30 Proyecto Secreto
  - 23:30 BMW
- Indoor Festival 2005:21 mars 2005
  - 22:10 Aventura
  - 22:20 Sergio Vargas
  - 22:30 Pachito Alonso
  - 22:40 K-Liber

=== 2004 ===
- 13 August 2004
  - 20:30 Krosfyah
  - 22:30 Fernando Villalona
  - 00:30 Gilberto Santa Rosa
  - 02:30 Ivan Villazon
  - 20:00 Young Cosje
  - 21:30 Ricardo Lemvo
  - 22:30 Carimi
  - 01:30 Awilo Longomba
  - 21:30 Internationals
  - 23:15 Gabriel Rios
  - 01:00 Squadra Bossa Ft. Buscemi
- 14 August 2004
  - 20:30 Fruko y sus Tesos
  - 22:30 Aventura
  - 00:30 Krispy y su Bombazo Tipico
  - 02:30 Krosfyah
  - 19:30 Ska Cubano
  - 21:30 Michele Henderson
  - 23:30 Cubanito 20.02
  - 01:30 Orlando "Maraca" Valle
  - 21:30 Clan 537
  - 23:15 K-Liber & MC Farah
  - 01:30 The Dill Brothers
- Indoor Festival 2004 : 15 mars 2004
  - 22:40 Amarfis y su bande de Attakke
  - 22:50 Guayacan
  - 23:00 Juanes
  - 23:10 Africando

=== 2003 ===
- 8 August 2003
  - 20:30 Square One
  - 22:30 Ng La Banda
  - 00:30 Carimi
  - 02:30 Kinito Mendez
  - 21:30 Monchy Y Alexandra
  - 23:30 Olivier N'Goma
  - 01:30 Los de Abajo
- 9 August 2003
  - 20:30 Guaco
  - 22:30 Los Diablitos
  - 00:30 Grupo Mania
  - 02:30 Square One
  - 19:30 Clan 537
  - 21:30 App'tijt
  - 23:30 Buscemi Live
  - 01:30 La Barriada
- Indoor Festival 2003:11 March 2003
  - 21:20 Bamboleo
  - 21:30 Mala Fe
  - 21:40 Oscar d'Leon
  - 21:50 Kassav'

=== 2002 ===
- José Alberto "El Canario"
- Fulanito
- Paulo FG y su Elite
- Gabino Pampini
- Cana Brava
- Binomio de Oro
- Manikkomio
- X-Plosion
- Aramis Galindo
- Bose Krioro
- Roy Cape All Stars
- International Garifuna Band
- Champeta All Stars
- Luc Leandry

=== 2001 ===
- Sonora Carruseles
- Kassav'
- Sierra Maestra
- Fulanito
- Puerto Rican Power
- Toros Band
- Guayacan
- Salsa Celtica
- Conjunto Chappottin
- Samy y Sandra Sandoval
- Arnell I Orkesta
- Ondrofeni
- Joseph Portes
- Youth Waves
- Garifuna All Stars

=== 1999 ===
- Celia Cruz
- Maraca
- José Alberto "El Canario"
- Alfredo de La Fe
- Kassav'
- Grupo Galé
- Kinito Mendez (merengue)
- Banda Chula (merengue)
- Grupo Mania (merengue)

=== 1998 ===
- El Gran Combo
- Orquesta Revé
- Tabou Combo
- Krosfyah
- Bana OK

=== 1997 ===
- Oscar d'Leon
- Africando
- Dan Den
- Klimax (timba)
- Tabou Combo
- Los Hermanos Rosario (merengue)
- Son Damas
- Alfredo Gutierrez
- Bredda David
- Blue Ventures
- La India Canela

=== 1996 ===
- Charanga Habanera
- Grupo Niche
- Kinito Mendez
- Coco Band
- Anacaona
- Reasons Orchestra
- Taxi Kreol
- Antonio Rivas
- Andy Palacio

=== 1995 ===
- Joe Arroyo y La Verdad
- Fruko & The Latin Brothers
- NG La Banda
- Wilfrido Vargas
- Original de Manzanillo
- Kali
- Zaïko Langa Langa
- Eclipse Steelband
- Orquesta d'Cache
- La Muralla
- Double Rock Kawina
- Rico Rodriguez
- Diblo Dibala
- Academy Brass International
- Sampling
- Roy Cape & The Kaiso All Stars
- Carlo Jones
- Yakki Famirie
- Fefita La Grande

=== 1993 ===
- Sierra Maestra
- Tabou Combo
- Fernando Villalona
- Toumpak
- Pride
- Skiffle Bunch
- La Fuerza Mayor
- Imaginations Brass

=== 1992 ===
- The Skatalites
- Coco Band
- Exile One
- Touch
- Opo Doti & A Sa Go
- Dixie Band
- Massive Chandelier
- Tipica Manzana
- Grupo Stabiel

=== 1991 ===
- Gazolinn'
- Gabby & Gryner
- Bati Kibra
- Derrick Morgan
- La Gran Manzana
- Koropina
- Reasons Orchestra
- Huracan

=== 1990 ===
- Laurel Aitken
- Arrow
- Ramon Orlando
- Tuco Bouzi & Dixie Band
- Heartbeat
- Caribbean Combo

=== 1989 ===
- Gypsy
- Vega Band
- Ebony Steelband
- July Mateo "Rasputin"
- TC & The Playboys
- J.M. Cambrimol & La Maafia

=== 1988 ===
- Wilfrido Vargas
- Dede St Prix
- Imaginations Brass
- Unisono / Heat Heat

=== 1987 ===
- Arrow
- Bomba
- Calypso Rose
- Pier' Rosier & Gazoline

=== 1986 ===
- Las Chicas Del Can
- Trinidad Troubadours
- Panvibes Steelband
- Bachanal

=== 1985 ===
- GI's Brass International
- Quicksilver

=== 1984 ===
- Flash Tropical Steels / Macay
- Sensacion Latina

=== 1983 ===
- Electric Ananas
- Cosecha

== Homepage of AntilliaanseFeesten.be ==
- Official website
