= Brenda Navarrete =

Cuban singer and musician

Brenda Navarrete, born 1991 in Havana, is a cuban singer and multi-instrumentalist.

== Career ==
Already when Navarrete studied in Manuel Saumell Elementary School of Music at age 9, she set her sights on percussion and a career in music. She graduated from Cuba's Amadeo Roldán Music Conservatory in 2009, earning accreditations as an instrumentalist, ensemble and percussion instructor.

In 2010, Navarrete won a national competition during Cuba's Fiesta del Tambor, winning first prize in the category of Bata drums, as well as for best interpretation by a female artist. It is on the batá that Navarrete has distinguished herself.

A review article in the New Yorker states: "A cornerstone of Santería religious ceremonies, batá drumming is a hypercompetitive ritual among men, judged on speed and memory; women are widely regarded as lacking the physical stamina for the instrument. In the religion, women are allowed to sing but are often prohibited from playing the batá and sometimes even prevented from standing near the instrument."

Navarrete is a long-standing member of Interactivo, a Havana-based musical collective led by the pianist Roberto Carcassés, who is known for incubating the city's best jazz talent. She has also worked with the Afro-Cuban percussion troupe, Obini Bata, a group first formed in the early 1990s by female drummers.

In 2017 she played and sang on pianist Hilario Duran's album, Contumbao, who then commissioned her own album, Mi Mundo, released by Alma Records. This 2018 album features an all-star cast of Cuban instrumentalists, including legendary bassist Alain Pérez and master drummer Horacio 'El Negro' Hernandez. Following the release of her debut solo album Navarrete has toured internationally with a collaborative production called Havana Meets Kingston in Australia, New Zealand, Europe and North America.

== Discography ==
- 2018 - Mi Mundo, Alma Records
