= Interactivo =

Interactivo is a collaborative group of Cuban musicians, led by the pianist, singer and composer Roberto Carcasses. As an acknowledgement of their growing notoriety, the band has recently been the subject of a documentary directed by Tane Martinez, and premiered at the Havana International Film Festival in December 2010.

== History ==
Interactivo is a music collective begun by Roberto Carcasses in Havana, Cuba around a core group of five musicians : Roberto Carcasses, Yusa, Francis de Rio, William Vivanco and Telmary Diaz. Credited as being the « director » of the group rather than the leader, Roberto Carcasses prides himself on Interactivo's free-form, experimental, and collaborative nature. Over the years, new members have joined the band, including Olivier Valdes, Rodney Barreto, Yaroldi Abreu, Carlos Rios, Raul Verdecia, Julio Padron, Carlos Miyares, David Suarez, Alexey Barroso, Juan Carlos Marin, Brenda Navarrete, Marjorie Rivera and Lisset Ochoa, among others.

The frequent line-up changes and comings and goings of its members has made Interactivo utterly indescribable and unable to be pinned under one musical genre. Traditional Afro-Cuban beats mingle with jazz, soul, rap, and funk music which highlights the individual musicians' strengths as well as the group's success at collaboration.

The release of their newest album, Cubanos por el Mundo, has launched a world tour. Numerous other renowned artists took part in the recording sessions, among them : singer and chekeré player Oscar Valdés, vocalist Bobby Carcassés, bassists Carlos Ríos, Feliciano Arango and Néstor del Prado, drummers Adel González, Rodney Yllarza Barreto and Oliver Valdés; guitarists Elmer Ferrer and José Luis Martínez; trumpetists Julio Padrón, Carlos Sarduy, Carlos M. Miyares and David Suárez; vocalists and chorists Marjorie Rivera, Melvis Santa, Santiago Feliú, Descemer Bueno, David Torrens, and Kelvis Ochoa.

== Awards ==
- 2006 Cubadisco Award for Goza Pepilla

== Discography ==
- 2005 Goza Pepillo ( Bis Music)

(Cubadisco Grand Prize in Fusion and Opera Prima)

- 2010 Cubanos por el Mundo ( Bis Music)
- 2014 Qué lindo es el amor

(Cubadisco Award in the category of Fusion)

- 2018 Interactivo en vivo en El Sauce
- 2019 INTERACTIVO EN VIVO EN FUJI ROCK
- 2022 En fa sostenido ( Bis Music)

== Festivals & Venues ==
- Jazz Plaza, La Habana, Cuba.
- Oslo World Music, Noruega.
- Congo Square Jazz Festival, New Orleans, USA.
- Latinoamericando Festival, Italia.
- Milan Global Cuban Fest, Miami.
- Luminato Festival, Toronto, Canadá.
- Fuji Rock, Japon
- La Mercé, Barcelona, España.
- Tempo Latino, Vic Fezensac, Francia.
- Festival Afrodiaspora, Bogotá, Colombia.
- Jazz Sur Son 31, Toulouse, Francia.
- Mas i Mas. Barcelona, España.
- Glastonburry, UK.

== Management & Booking ==
- (( Hummo Productions ))

== See also ==
- Roberto Carcasses
- Telmary Diaz
- Yusa
- Kelvis Ochoa
- Descemer Bueno
