= Haitian Music Award =

Haitian music award show

Haitian Music Awards
- Awarded for: Outstanding achievements for Haitian artists in the record industry
- Country: Haiti
- First award: 2009

The Haitian Music Awards (HMA) is an annual Haitian music awards show that first took place on April 12, 2009, at the Avery Fisher Hall at New York's Lincoln Center for the Performing Arts.

== History ==
The first Haitian Music Awards (on a more international stage) took place during the month of February 2009. This inaugural music award honored the pioneer and founder of compas direct, Nemours Jean-Baptiste, and showcased the works of artists from the entire Haitian music spectrum.

Compas on Broadway is the premier Haitian Music Awards event and the first of its kind in New York City. The nominees included individual bands such as Tabou Combo, Djakout Mizik, Nu-Look, Carimi, T-Vice, and not limited to individual artists as Emeline Michel, Misty Jean and Alan Cavé.

== See also ==
- Music of Haiti
