= Kumar (musician) =

Cuban musician (born 1984)

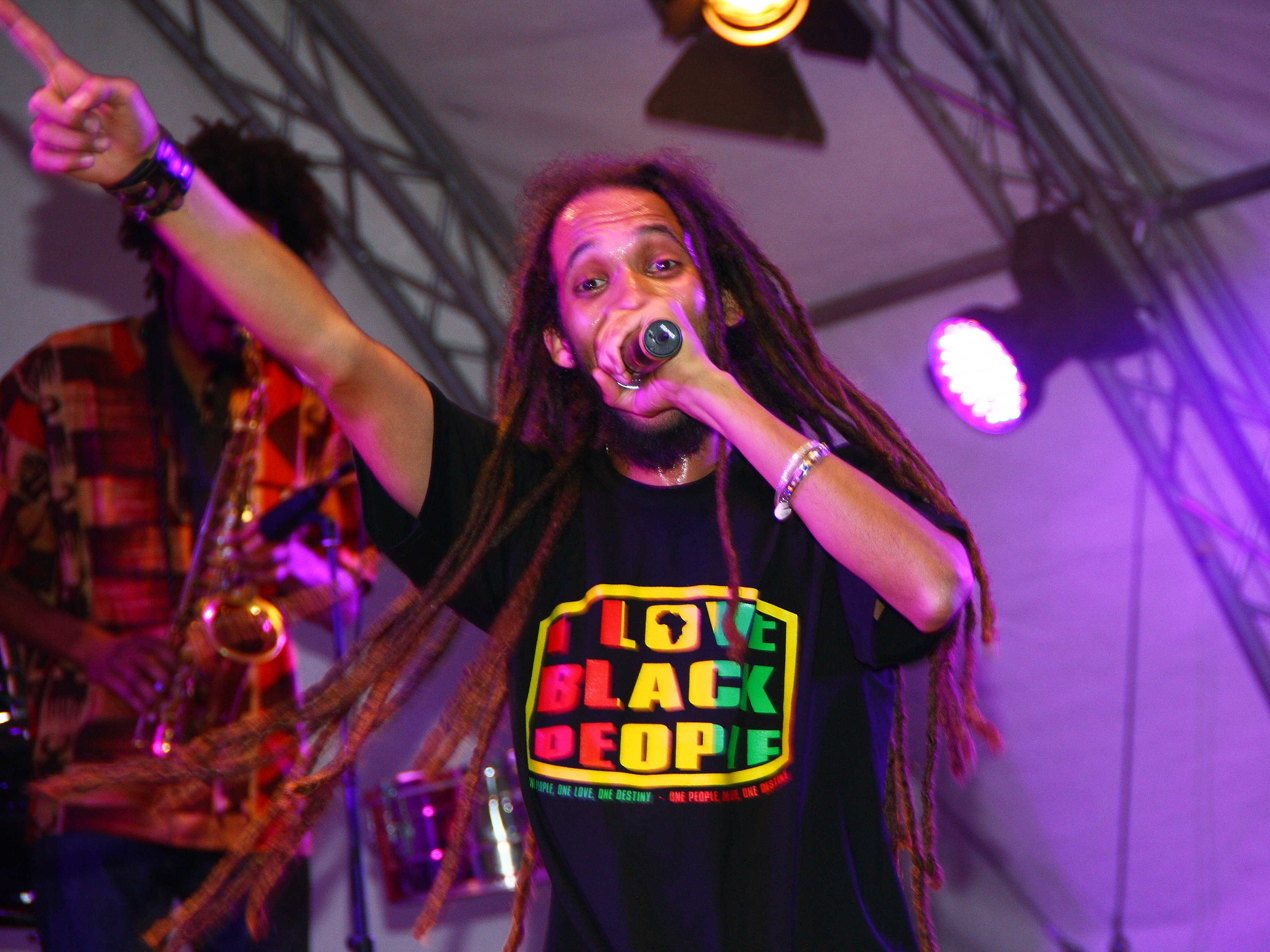

Background information
- Born: 1984
- Genres: Hip-hop
- Years active: 1998–Present

Kumar is a Cuban musician who was born in Havana in 1984. He also appeared as an actor in Benito Zambrano’s movie Habana Blues, and his song "No Se Vuelve Atras" is featured in the movie’s soundtrack.

== History ==
Kumar started his career in 1998, performing in a collective called Duros Como el Acero (Hard as steel). At that time, Kumar adopted his first rapper nickname, “El Menor”.

He became part of the Familias Cuba Represent collective and appeared on several albums and compilations. This collaboration was the trigger that reinforced his decision to make his living playing music. In 2003, he produced his first solo songs’ demo under the name of Kumar.

He is currently part of the artist’s collective Interactivo, which involves famous Cuban artists from the new fusion scene such as Yusa, Telmary, William Vivanco and producer Roberto Carcassés.

Very close from other Cuban artists of his generation, Kumar participated in the Havana Cultura Tour in Ibiza during summer 2008, accompanied by the R&B style singer Diana Fuentes and the DJ Erick Gonzalez.

== Performances and Releases ==
In 2004, Kumar recorded the song No Se Vuelve Atras with the artist Telmary Diaz and the band Qvalibre. This song was included in the soundtrack of the movie Habana Blues, in which Kumar played a supporting role.

In April 2005, he recorded the song Rompe Cadenas, along with the Spanish group Ojos de Brujo. The song featured Roberto Carcasses (piano) and Yusa (bass) and was recorded in the Abdala studios.

The first solo album of Kumar, Película de Barrio, was released in 2009 under the independent label Diquela Records/Universal. He features several collaborations with Cuban artists and the Spanish group Ojos de Brujo.

== Awards ==
- 2004 : Nomination at the Lucas Prizes (Cuban video clip festival) for the song Ves.
- 2006 : “Best Rap / Hip-hop Demo” and “Audience award” at the Cuerda Viva Prizes.
