= Bye Bye Havana =

2005 Cuban film by J. Michael Seyfert

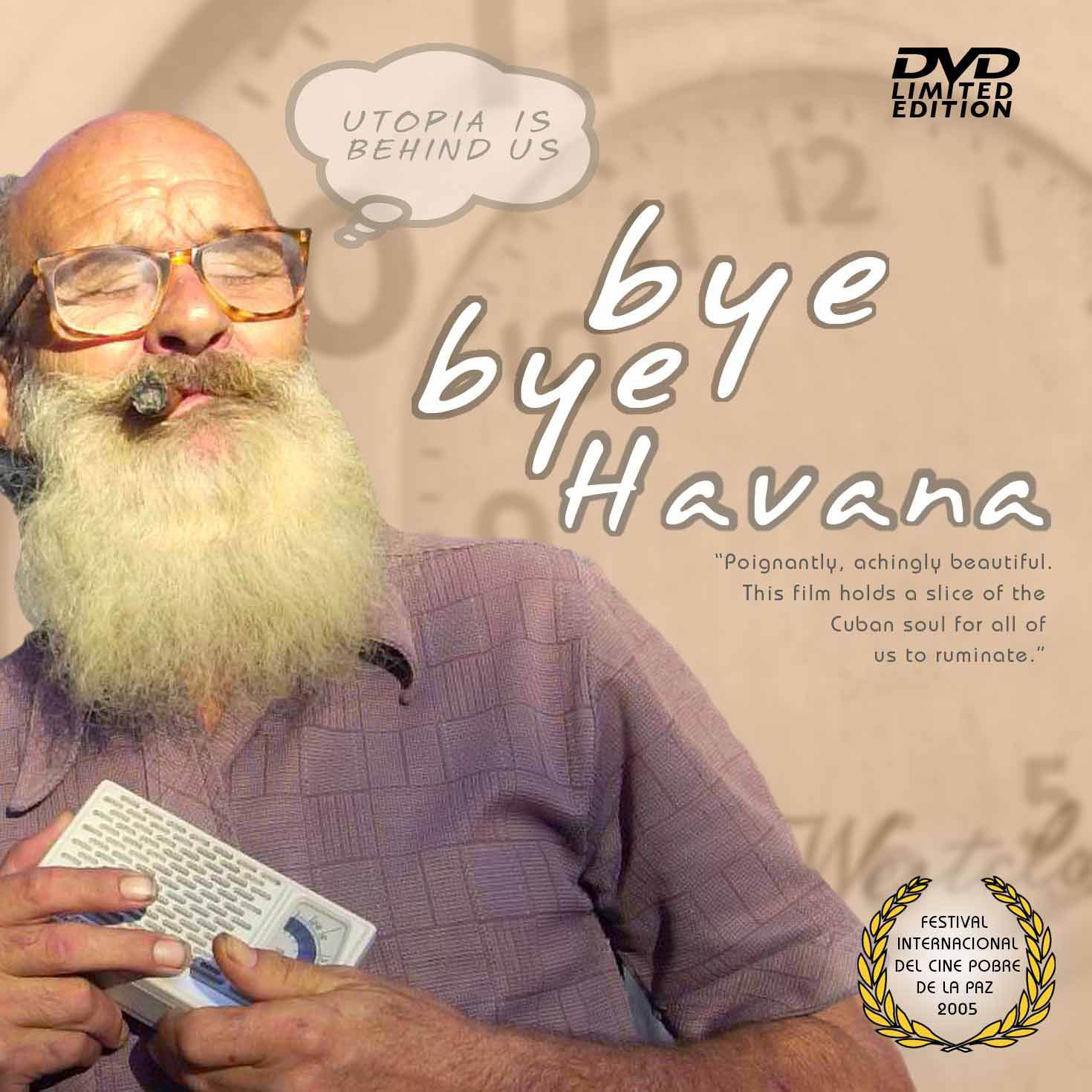
- Film Poster & First Edition DVD Sleeve
- Directed by: J. Michael Seyfert
- Written by: J. Michael Seyfert
- Starring: Roger Bunn
- Cinematography: J. Michael Seyfert
- Edited by: Andros Barroso; Manuel Iglesias
- Distributed by: Journeyman Pictures
- Release date: 2005
- Running time: 58 minutes
- Country: Cuba
- Languages: Spanish, English

Bye Bye Havana is a 2005 fast-paced stream of consciousness documentary that presents a vibrant portrayal of Cuban life. The film juxtaposes commercialism with vintage anti-communist propaganda and the elementary difficulties that everyday Cubans face. Directed by J. Michael Seyfert the film was shot and edited in Cuba over the course of 2 years. For its enduring images, Carlos Alberto Montaner of Foreign Policy calls Seyfert's film "A colorful and sobering picture of the Cuba that Fidel has left behind".

== Official Selections ==
Bye Bye Havana premiered in the United States on October 16, 2005 at 20th Fort Lauderdale International Film Festival and screened at numerous festivals around the world including on April 22, 2006 Cine Las Americas International Film Festival in Austin and 5th Annual Tiburon International Film Festival. On Dec 6th and 8th 2006 the film screened at Tallinn Black Nights Film Festival in Estonia. On February 21, 2007 Bye Bye Havana was broadcast four times on Free Speech TV and Dish Satellite Channel 9415 and 150 community access cable stations reaching a potential audience of over 25 million people. The film was broadcast on Mongolia State TV and continues to figure prominently among post-revolutionary documentaries.

== Awards ==
Best Post Production 2006 Atlanta International Documentary Film Festival.

== Soundtrack ==
Bye Bye Havana's soundtrack features hip hop and afro-rock musician X Alfonso and Free Hole Negro, a hip hop underground band, jazz pianist Roberto Carcasses and Cuban rapper and spoken-word artist Telmary. The film's theme song was composed and performed by the singer Francis Del Rio.

Non-Cuban contributions were made by Roger Bunn, British rock musician who narrated the film and contributed three tracks from his posthumously released album Piece of Mind featuring the Netherlands Symphony Orchestra. American songwriter T Bone Burnett's song Humans From Earth was recorded in Bristol by British indie pop band The Flatmates produced by Paul Cooke, drummer and founding member of the British smooth jazz band SADE. Cooke also co-produced a trance dub with London DJ Herbus K. Dubington of Lagrimas Negras a 1929 bolero-son by the Cuban composer and singer Miguel Matamoros. The Cuban classic was used as a theme throughout the film in various interpretations including an acoustic guitarist and a nameless Cuban street violinist.

== Reviews ==
- The Culture Trip "The Best Documentaries to Watch About Cuba"
- inCUBAdora "Cuba Underground Guide"
- DVD Talk Film Review
- Academia.edu "El cine en español en los Estados Unidos"
- Ramonet vs. Montaner: el gran debate sobre Cuba
