= Roberto Carcassés =

Roberto Carcassés is a Cuban jazz pianist. He was born on May 19, 1972, in Havana, Cuba. He has collaborated with many musicians, such as Chucho Valdés, Changuito, Wynton Marsalis, George Benson, and Descemer Bueno. He is the bandleader of the Interactivo collective.

== Biography ==
Also known as Robertico, Roberto Carcassés graduated in percussion from the National School of Arts in Havana in 1991. He toured as a pianist with the Grupo de Santiago Feliú in Argentina, Germany, and Spain between 1992 and 1995. He took part in a tour in Spain and the US with the group Columna B, in 1998–1999. During this period, he taught in the Jazz Workshop of Stanford University.

== Solo career ==
Carcassés has been invited to perform at many international jazz festivals, including the Barcelona Jazz Festival (1997), the Havana Festival (1995, 1996, 1997) and the Utah Jazz Festival (1998). In 1997, Roberto Carcassés composed the soundtrack for the film Violetas (México), as well as some songs for the films Cuarteto De La Habana (Spain) and New Rose Hotel (US). His CD, entitled Invitation and released in 2000, showcased many aspects of his musical capacity as a pianist, but also as a music director and arranger. Carcassés presented his last album, Matizar, at the Che Guevara hall of the Casa de las Américas in July 2009.

== Collaborations ==
Carcassés has collaborated with many musicians such as Chucho Valdés, Changuito, Wynton Marsalis, George Benson, Gonzalito Rubalcaba, and Harper Simon.

He participated in the albums Trampas Del Tiempo (Pavel y Gema), Jazz Timbero (alongside his father, Bobby Carcassés) and Twisted Noon (Columna B).

His most recent productions are Telmary’s A diario (2006), and Breathe (2006), the second album of singer, songwriter, and multi-instrumentalist Yusa. He worked on Goza Pepillo as bandleader for Interactivo, a collective that includes Yusa, Telmary Diaz, Francis del Rio, William Vivanco, Elmer Ferrer, Rodney Barreto, Julio Padrón, Juan Carlos Marin, Carlos Sarduy, Denis Cuní, Alexander Brown, Rafael Paseiro, Edgar Martinez, Adel González, Carlos Mirayes, Nestor del Prado, Oliver Valdés, Lissette Ochoa, Lisandra, Maryuri Rivera, Jorge L. Chicoy, Roberto Martinez, Kumar, Athanai, Kelvis Ochoa, and Descemer Bueno. The collective won the Cubadisco Award in 2006.

== Jazz festival performances ==
- Ottawa International Jazz Festival, Canada (2005)
- Istanbul International Jazz Festival, Turkey (2003)
- Utah Jazz Festival, U.S.A (1998)
- Stanford Jazz Festival, California U.S.A (1998)
- Barcelona Jazz Festival, Spain (1997)
- Festival de San Sebastián with David Murry, Spain
- Festival de Jazz Vienne Sud de la France
- Festival de La Habana (1995, 1996, 1997, 2006)
- Blue Note, Tokyo, Japan Ronnie Scott, London U.K Jamboree, Barcelona, Spain

== Compositions, productions, arrangements ==
- Pavel y Gema- Trampas del tiempo
- Bobby Carcassés – Jazz Timbero
- Columna B – Twisted Noon for Mambo Music, Selma Reis
- Luis Bofill – New Album (2007)
- Interactivo, Goza Pepillo Award winner (Prize Cubadisco + Opera Prima y Fusión) (2006)
- Yusa – Breath – U.K (2006)
- Telmary – A Diario – Cuba (2006)
- William Vivanco – La Isla Milagrosa – Cuba (2006)
- Francis del Rio – Sentimiento – Cuba (2006)
- Breathing Havana – Compilation – Japan (2006)
- Cool Cool Filin – Compilation- Japan (2006)
- Ojos de Brujo – Techarí – Spain (2006)
- Jazz Cuba Today DVD, first DVD to be released in Cuba (2005)
- Roberto Carcassés – Invitation Solo Album, Velas Rec. U.S.A (2000)
