= Leoni Torres =

Cuban singer & composer (born 1977)

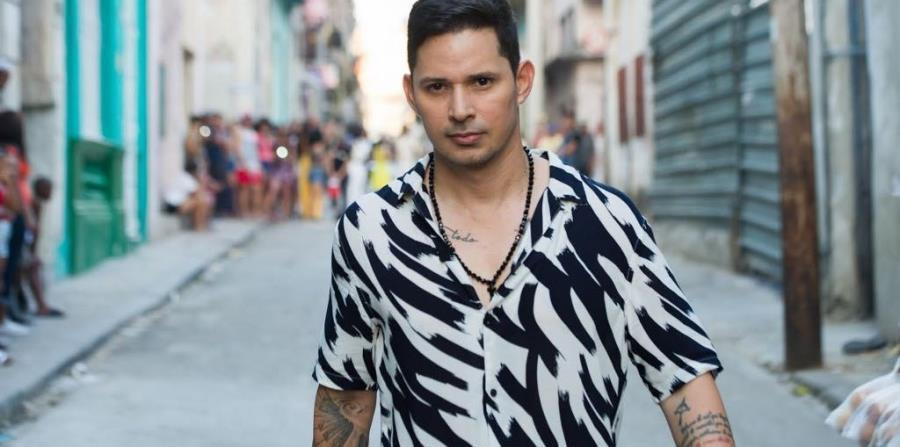
- Born: Leonardo Torres Álvarez; November 24, 1977 (age 48); Camagüey, Cuba
- Occupations: Singer; songwriter; record producer
- Years active: 1998–present
- Spouse: Yuliet Cruz (m. 2006)
- Children: 3
- Musical career
- Genres: Tropical music; Pop
- Instrument: Vocals
- Labels: Puntilla Music; Legacy Recordings
- Website: leonitorres.com

Leonardo Torres Álvarez (24 November 1977) known professionally as Leoni Torres, is a Cuban singer, composer and music producer. He has recorded six albums as part of his career as a soloist and has collaborated with musical figures such as Rosario Flores, Pablo Milanés, Willy Chirino, Gilberto Santa Rosa, Beatriz Luengo, Carlos Varela, Cimafunk, Francisco Céspedes, among others. He is a member of The Latin Recording Academy and his compositions have been recognized by the American Society of Composers, Authors and Publishers.

== Biography ==
Torres began his professional career in 1998 in his hometown called Santa Cruz del Sur, in Camagüey. In 1999, he joined the Maravillas de Florida orchestra. His work in this group caught the attention of David Calzado, who was the leader of Charanga Habanera, and he suggested that Torres join his orchestra as a singer. Torres joined the orchestra in 2001, staying there for 7 years.

Between 2001 and 2007, Torres was part of Charanga Habanera. During this period he performed musical duos and other projects, achieving success with hits such as Soy cubano, soy popular and Ay! Hay amor.

In 2007, Torres began his career as a soloist, debuting the following year with his first individual work with the presentation of the album Bajo la Piel (2008). The album was published under the label of the Empresa de Recordaciones y Ediciones Musicales (EGREM) and made him the revelation male singer of the year in Cuba.

In 2011, Torres released his second album called Latiendo, with which he continued as a solo artist on the contemporary Cuban music charts.

His third album called Salseando was released in 2012 under the label of the "Musical Recordings and Editions Company" (EGREM). In this album, Torres compiled and covered songs from his previous works (Bajo la piel and Latiendo), but this time taken to salsa.

In 2014, Torres continued to compose more songs. Some of these songs from this period include Traidora, a song that was eventually performed by Marc Anthony and Gente de Zona, obtaining international success, and Para que un día vuelvas, a work that he shared as a duet with Pablo Milanés.

Torres debuted as an actor in the films Contigo pan y Cebolla (2014) and Esteban (2016), where he had a special participation.

In 2016, Torres recorded and produced his next album called "Amor Bonito" (Volume 1) which was mainly made up of duets, including with Pablo Milanés, Kelvis Ochoa, Descemer Bueno and Alexander Abreu.

In March 2017, Torres won the Best Tropical Music Composition award for the hit Traidora, presented in Puerto Rico, as part of the American Society of Composers, Authors and Publishers Awards, which recognizes each year exponents of Latin music.

In August 2019, Torres went on the Amor Bonito Tour with Live Nation and Miami Late Night for the House of Blues from different cities in the United States. This tour also extended to Europe with performances in Spain, Italy, France and Sweden.

Some of the notable songs of Torres' career are Toda una vida, Es tu mirada, The things that I ask of you and Me quedo contigo, as well as No puedo parar with Gilberto Santa Rosa, Se me olvidó quererte accompanied by the Spanish artist Rosario Flores, Mejor sin ti, together with the duo Gente de Zona and El Último Adiós with Pancho Céspedes.

Torres is a member of The Latin Recording Academy, which has awarded the Latin Grammy since 2018.

In 2020, Torres released Deja la tristeza and his song Recordándote with the urban musician El Micha. This single was produced by Daneon, a Colombian music producer who has worked with Marc Anthony, Will Smith and Enrique Iglesias. The album features musical production by Leoni Torres himself, Kelvis Ochoa and Leonardo Gil Milián, and will be published by the Puntilla Music record label. The material, whose first single is "Miloca", includes ten songs, five of them composed by Kelvis Ochoa, four by Torres, as well as a version of a song by Polo Montañez.
