= The Dubbeez =

Dutch reggae band

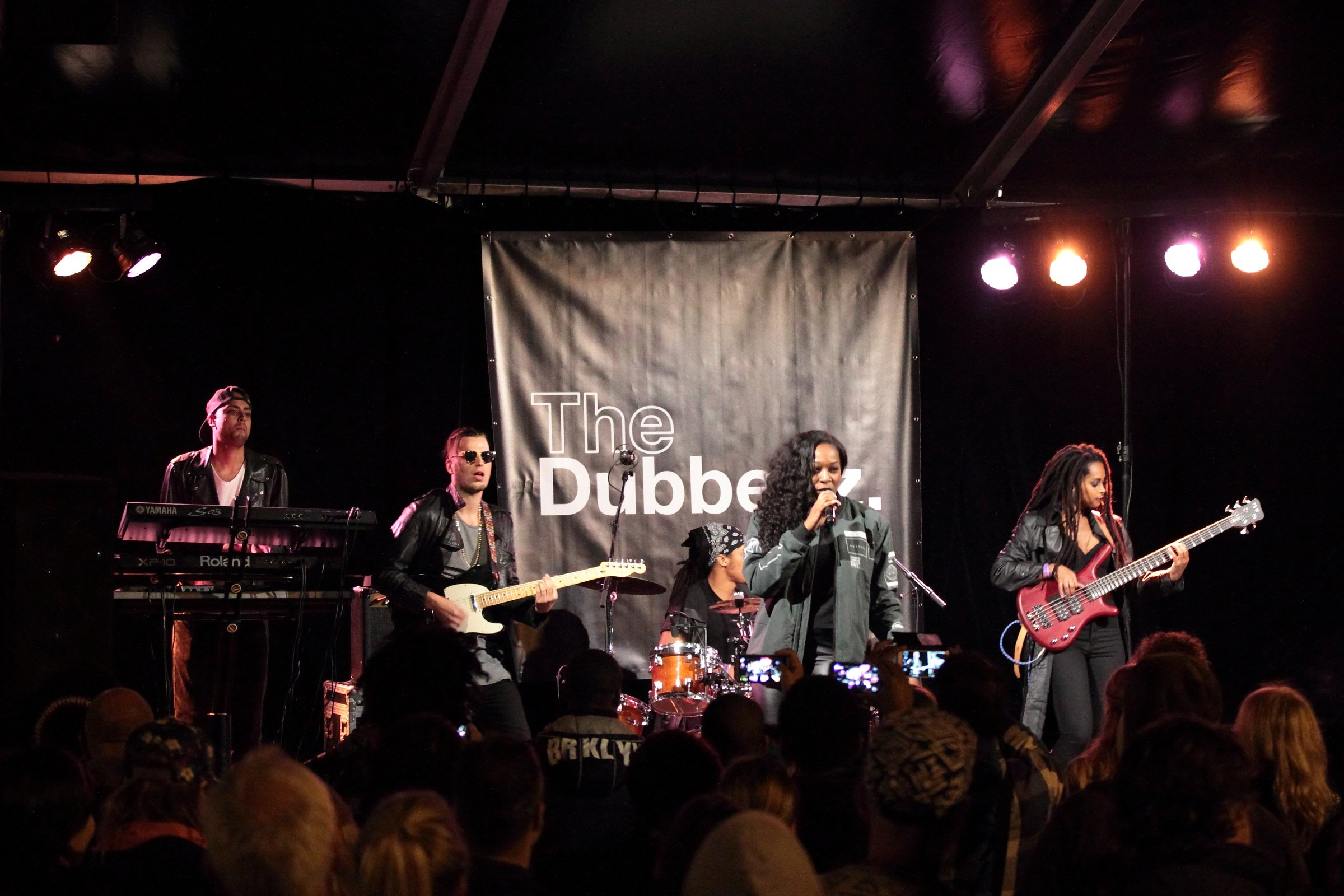
- The Dubbeez performing at Uitmarkt in 2015

Background information
- Origin: Amsterdam, Netherlands; Almere, Flevoland, Netherlands
- Genres: Reggae
- Years active: 2014–2019
- Members: Joanne Tholel; Quincy Fleur; Millan van Wingerden; Bobby Sahiboe; Olivia Davina Ramdat; Earl Maddy

The Dubbeez was a Dutch reggae band from Amsterdam and Almere.

== History ==
The band won the "Battle of the Bands" at Uitmarkt Festival in Amsterdam in September 2015.

In 2016 The Dubbeez participated at the Reggaeville's World Reggae Contest, being selected among the five finalists. They performed at the final night of the Ostróda Reggae Festival in Poland and won the competition.

The band released its first studio album Love, Peace & Dub on 26 January 2018. The same year they performed at Antilliaanse Feesten.

On 4 January 2019 the band published a post on their Facebook account stating «We've been locked up in the studio making new music. We can't wait to share it with you all». This was later revealed to be untrue, since the band split the next month as announced on the same page on 5 February 2019.

== Members ==
- Joanne Tholel – lead vocals
- Quincy Fleur – rap vocals
- Millan van Wingerden – guitars
- Bobby Sahiboe – keyboards
- Olivia Davina Ramdat – bass
- Earl Maddy – drums

== Discography ==
=== Studio albums ===
- Peace, Love & Dub (2018)

=== Extended plays ===
- Dubby (2016)

=== Singles ===
- "Rudebwoy" (2015)
- "Hangover" (2016)
- "Feelings" (2017)
- "Obsession" (2018)
