= The Havana Cultura Tour =

2008 Cuban concert tour in Spain

The Havana Cultura Tour is a Cuban music concert tour, taking place in Ibiza (Spain) during summer. The first edition of the Havana Cultura Tour occurred in July and August 2008, featuring three artists from Cuba: a famous rapper called Kumar, an R&B style singer named Diana Fuentes, both accompanied by DJ Erick Gonzalez. Havana Club, the original Cuban rum brand, is the organizer of the event.

== Genesis of the event ==
The project is born from a desire to promote Cuban contemporary music abroad, and especially in “the capital of subcultures”: the island of Ibiza. The idea was to mix different styles of music, in order to recreate the atmosphere of the descarga – jam session, an unofficial concert improvised in Havana and blending artists from different musical world, all improvising together.

== Musical style ==
The three artists playing together created a style called “Urban Groove”, in reference to the jam sessions which often occur in the streets of Havana. It can be defined as a fusion between hip-hop, funk, jazz and different Cuban music styles like rumba and son.

== The singers ==
Kumar

Kumar is a famous rapper whose style oscillates between rap, jazz, funk, reggae and rock’n’roll. He draws his inspiration from the streets of Havana. Kumar released his first solo album Película de Barrio in January 2009 (Diquela Records / Universal) that includes duos with renowned Cuban musicians such as the band Ojos de Brujo.

Diana Fuentes

This new artist is immersed in the music since childhood. She was for a time the chorister of Síntesis, X Alfonso, Kumar, and Carlos Varela, and released this year her first solo album, produced by Descemer Bueno and flavoured with R&B, soul, funk, and pop. She is not only a singer but also the composer of her songs.

== Clubs ==
The Havana Cultura Tour 2008 took place in 3 clubs:

• Guarana, located in Santa Eularia in the northeast coast of the island. • Las Dalias, located near Santa Eularia. • Kronoss, located in Es Vive, in the southeast coast of the Island, near the Platja d’en Bossa.
