= Ya No Hace Falta =

Studio album by Bamboleo
- Released: 1999
- Genre: Timba
- Label: Ahí-Namá Music

Bamboleo chronology
Yo No Me Parezco A Nadie (1998)	Ya No Hace Falta (1999)	Ñño! Qué Bueno Está (2000)

Ya No Hace Falta is an album by the Cuban band Bamboleo. It was released in 1999. The title track ("I am not in need") was the group's most commercially successful song. The band supported Ya No Hace Falta with a North American tour. The title track appeared in the film Suite Habana.

== Production ==
The majority of the album's songs were written and arranged by bandmember Lázaro Valdés, who was chiefly influenced by Earth, Wind & Fire. The songs were performed by four singers and 10 musicians. Valdes employed tumbaoes on many of the songs.

== Critical reception ==
Professional ratings
Review scores
Source	Rating
AllMusic	4/5 stars

The Sun-Sentinel wrote that "Bamboleo blends funky urban salsa with storytelling and arrangements that feature blaring horns, thunderous percussion and four poetic vocalists... Its music includes more breakdowns than the commercial salsa heard in the United States and Puerto Rico, so much so that the tembleque, or tremor, is ideally suited to freestyle dancing." The Washington Post called the album "irresistible," writing that it is full of "lots of bottom, lots of funk, lots of power in the horns."

The Santa Cruz Sentinel determined that "each track is uniquely eloquent, carrying the air of improvised artistic freedom and a clear-metered knowledge of the right musical elements." The Star Tribune noted that "the percolating piano, call-and-response vocals and sizzling percussion are unmistakably—and irresistibly—Cuban."

AllMusic wrote that "the group certainly does not want for heat, with salty montunos from pianist/arranger Lazaro Valdes and plenty of time-shifting breaks from a percussion section as good as any operating today."

== Track listing ==
No.	Title	Length
1.	"Opening"
2.	"Ya No Hace Falta"
3.	"Recapacita"
4.	"Se le Fue la Mano"
5.	"El Manisero"
6.	"Candil de Nieve"
7.	"Lo Que Quiero es Bamboleo"
8.	"La Tremenda"
9.	"El Pillo"
10.	"El Protagonista"
11.	"Lo Mio"
12.	"Ya No Hace Falta (Edited Version)"
