= Alan Cavé =

Haitian musician

- Also known as: AC
- Born: Georges Alan Cavé; February 27, 1966 (age 60); New York City, USA
- Genres: Compas, troubadour
- Occupations: Singer, producer, entrepreneur
- Instrument: Guitar
- Years active: 1989–present
- Labels: AC, Entertainment & Distribution
- Formerly of: Zin

Georges Alan Cavé (born February 27, 1966) is a Haitian-American lead singer of the compas (kompa) band Zin.

== Early years ==
Cavé's was born to Haitian parents, and spent most of his adolescent years in Haiti. His mother Yanick Jean was a writer, and his father is a poet, writer, and art director named Syto Cavé. His cousin is singer Richard Cavé of the band Carimi. Cavé often accompanied his famous father on his tours of the Caribbean (Martinique, Guadeloupe, Saint Lucia), France, the United States and Canada.

Born into a literary family, Cavé began playing guitar and writing music during his youth. His professional career began after a debut performance of the song "La Personne," where he filled in for an ill actor. Following the public's response to this performance, he chose to pursue music professionally and gained significant recognition in Haiti.

In 1987, he met with Alex Abellard and Eddy Saint-Vil to audition, and Cavé was quickly signed for the group Zin. The group released their first album, "O Pa", in 1989. More than two decades later, Zin's guitarist-songwriter Eddy St. Vil, keyboardist and leader Alex Abellard, and its 11 band members remain popular, with sweet ballads and traditional Haitian kompa grooves. Cavé's voice, sometimes characterized as "seductive," considerably aided the success of the band.

== Career ==
Alan Cavé is a songwriter with a body of work in English, French, and Haitian Creole. He attributes his inspiration to everyday life and human interaction, noting that his process relies on professional discipline and effort. He is a frequent performer within the French-Caribbean community and identifies primarily as a writer and composer.

Cavé has collaborated with some known kompa artists and bands of the French Caribbean such as Malavoi, Mario DeVolcy, Tanya Saint-Val, Haddy N'jie and Roy Shirley. In 2001 he launched his first solo album, Se Pa Pou Dat, which was an enormous success. This album seems to transcend barriers of language and cultural sound, with its melodies popular in Japan, Africa and South America, even though listeners may not understand the words. He continuous to have a solo career and has released five solo kompa albums.

== Discography ==
- Lagé'm (1993)
- Best of (2000)
- Se Pa Pou Dat (2001)
- Collabo (2004)
- De La Tête Aux Pieds (2007)
- Timeless Volume 1 (2014)
- Timeless Volume 2 (2014)

== Singles ==
- Chokola 2003
- Jwenn 2007
- De la tete au Pied 2007
- Mon seul regret 2012
- Men kann Lan 2012
- Grave sou kê'm 2012
- Lil mama 2014
- Twerk that 2014
- Fanm sa 2014
- Se pa pou dat 2003
