= Eddy-K =

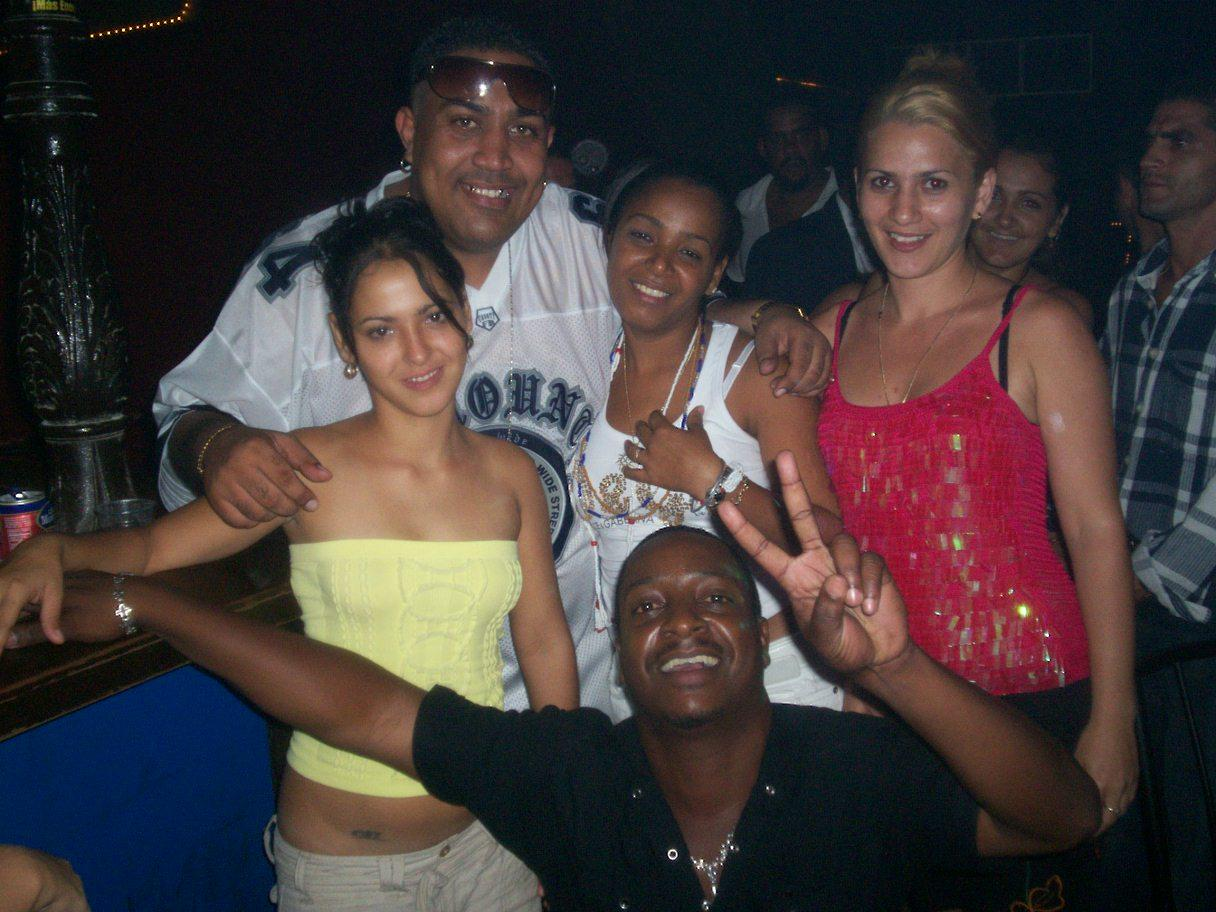
Eduardo Mora Hernández and fans, after a concert in "Casa de la Música", Havana. October 10, 2006.

Eddy-K was a Cubaton/Reggaeton group from Cuba.

Eddy-K was at the beginning a duo with "Eddy" (Eduardo Mora Hernández) and "K" Leyden. In August 1998 the singer of rap music "Jorgito" (Jorge Francisco Hernández Carvajal) joined them.

Kleidis left the band a short time after. The band became larger after with the arrival of the singer "Deep Drama" (Damian Aguirre Perez) in 2000, and "DJ Tony" (José Antonio Suárez Torres) in November 2001.

They made the music of the television show of Cuban television "La Otra Geografía, did a world tour with "La Charanga Habanera y Las Voces de Cuba" (Vania, Osdalgia & Halia) (in the place of Halia), and did the first part of the concert of Don Omar in Cancún.

One of their more known songs is La Habana me queda chiquita, a remake of the band of timba Pachito Alonso y su Kini Kini, with Christian and Rey Alonso.

The song Aquí están los cuatro has become number 3 in the "hit-parade" of the American magazine "Latinos Unidos".

During 2006, the group released a number of songs, including two duets with other Cuban artists -

- Entrale, with the Cuban diva Haila, and
- Llegate, with Charanga Habanera.

In early 2008, Eduardo Mora and DJ Tony left Cuba and resettled in Miami. Damian and Jorgito have since gone on to form a new group in Cuba, known as Los 4 (Los Salvajes).

Mora has continued using the "Eddy K" name. Later in 2010 he started working with Music Producer/Artist Sharo Torres and right away they started producing what is now known as his latest production called "CubanStyle". He is most famous for his mix of salsa and Cuban Reggaeton (cubaton). Eddy K released a new production in 2014 called "La Academia" which with multiple collaborations with Puerto Rican Artist and more.

Eddy K has a music career spanning over 20 years, where in this time he alongside other Cuban artists helped create the Cuban version of Reggaeton named Cubaton. In 2008 he moved to the sunny city of Miami being the first Cuban Urban artist to emigrate looking for a broader horizon where he began working on his international music career. While in Miami, Eddy K has made hits such as (“Tierra Caliente feat. Gente de Zona”, “ Pa’ Partirte En 2”, “Blanca feat. Farruko & “Regalame Otra Noche” feat. Fuego. In 2021 his new album titled Dale V will be released.

== Discography ==
=== United States ===
- Eddy K "La Academia" released on iTunes November 17, 2014 by Mayimba Music, Inc. Producer: Sharo Torres
1. Intro
2. Todo el Mundo Activao
3. Quiere Bailar
4. Modela Que Yo Voy Atrás (feat. Poesia Urbana)
5. Si Ella No Me Quiere
6. Quiere Seguir
7. Contra el Tráfico (feat. Sammy la Sensacion)
8. Dilo en Mi Cara
9. Déjame Entrar
10. No Creo en el Amor (feat. Lenier)
11. Pa Partirte en Dos (feat. Mr. D.)
12. Le Dolia
13. Dale Lo Que Pida
14. Se Acaba Orita
15. El Dueño del Party (feat. Ephrem J)
- Eddy K "CubanStyle" (2011)
1. Intro
2. El Tracketeo
3. La Infladora Feat Chacal
4. Dale La Pata
5. Dice Que Yo
6. Dame Un Break (Brey)
7. Pa Partirte En Dos Feat Mr D
8. Entrame Por El Tubo
9. La Web Cam
10. Se Acabo El Amor Feat Vanessa Formell
11. Siempre Esta Pegao
12. Calentando El Evento
13. El Pudin (Remix) Feat Osmany Garcia & Jose El Pillo
14. Cual Es El Mirar Feat El Mola
15. Vine Con To
16. La Cenicienta Feat El Mola
17. Gracias
- Asalto (Premium Latin Music, 2009)
1. Intro
2. La Super Estrella
3. Diselo a Mami (feat. Maikol y el Karo)
4. Bandolero
5. Sientelo (feat. Vanessa Formell)
6. Mami Besame
7. Asalto
8. No Entiendo
9. No Me Interesa (feat. El Mola)
10. Sale
11. No Hay Otro Como Yo
12. La Fiesta (feat. Isaac Delgado)
13. Billete de 100
14. Cuentalo (feat. Gianco)
15. Que Clase de Problema
16. Mami Besame

=== Cuba ===
- Llegaron Los Salvajes (2007) Released on iTunes: Sep 18, 2007
1. Intro
2. El Chacal
3. Me Vuelves Loco

Al Doblar de la Esquina

1. Apagón Total
2. A Ella le Gusta el Party
3. Hablale por Mi
4. Activao
5. La Gente Que Me Quiere
6. Soy Tu Dueño
7. No Sigas Mirandome
8. Llegaron los Salvajes
9. El Castigador
10. No para de Moverse
11. Mami No Me Cuelgues
12. Pero Que No Se Entere
13. Ellas Son Dos
14. Amigos
- Aqui estan los cuatro (Ahí Namá / Sony-BMG Italy, 2004)
1. Opening No. 1
2. Sabes quién llegó
3. A mi tu no me engañas
4. Ellos no saben na'
5. Llorando
6. Llegó la escuela
7. Aqui están los cuatro
8. Contra la pared
9. Me contaron
10. Me están mirando
11. No me hables de moral
12. Déjala que siga
13. Mujeres
14. Quieren tirarme
15. Son celos
16. Ven, conéctate
17. Que no me vengan diciendo
18. El genio de la lámpara
