= William Vivanco =

Cuban musician (born 1975)

- William Vivanco

Background information
- Born: October 6, 1975 (age 50)
- Origin: Santiago, Cuba
- Genres: Reggae, pop
- Labels: Bis Music

William Vivanco (born October 6, 1975, in Santiago de Cuba) is a Cuban composer and musician.

== Career ==
Vivanco learnt to play the guitar after visiting the Casa de la Trova in Santiago de Cuba, a traditional music venue in Cuba that focuses on the performance and promotion of trova music. He also used to perform as a street musician and with a professional children's choir.

In 2002, he released his first solo album under the Bis Music label, Lo Tengo To' Pensa'o, which is a blend of Brazilian music, pop, and reggae. One notable song from the album is Cimarrón, which refers to African slaves who escaped from their Spanish masters.

In 2006, Vivanco recorded his second solo album, La Isla Milagrosa, produced by Descemer Bueno and Roberto Carcassés. Following this period, Vivanco's music style began to reflect the traditional music of Santiago de Cuba as opposed to other genres such as pop and funk.

Vivanco has performed at several festivals, including Les Transmusicales de Rennes festival in 2003, the Paléo Festival in 2004, and Les Nuits du Sud festival in Vence, France in 2005, as well as the Les Nuits de Fourvière in Cuba.

== Style ==
Vivanco's style is rooted in traditional Cuban music, but it also incorporates influences from reggae, bossa nova, blues, rap, pop, and rock, as well as elements characteristic of Haitian, Celtic, and oriental genres.

== Discography ==
- 2002: Lo Tengo To' Pensa'o
- 2006: La Isla Milagrosa
- 2009: El Mundo Está Cambia'o
- 2016: Mejorana
- 2018: La isla milagrosa (Remasterizado)
- 2020: Trece Con Magia
