= Habana Abierta =

Cuban band

- Origin: Havana, Cuba
- Genres: Nueva Trova
- Years active: 1996–present
- Members: Vanito Brown; Jose Luis Medina; Luis Barbería; Alejandro Gutiérrez
- Past members: Boris Larramendi; Kelvis Ochoa; Pepe del Valle; Andy Villalón
- Website: http://myspace.com/habanaabierta

Habana Abierta is a Cuban band. They are part of a generation of composers, musicians, sculptors, authors, and actors that emerged in the early '90s with its own identity in Havana, even though some of their creations had already been well-known for some years in the island's cultural circles.

The origins of Habana Abierta go back to a personal project of music duo Gema y Pável, who wanted to produce a compilation of everything they and their peers had been doing in Havana clubs with few resources. Initially, Luis Alberto Barbería, Pepe del Valle, Carlos Santos, Boris Larramendi, Superavit, Andy Villalón, Kelvis Ochoa and José Luis Medina, backed by the NUBENEGRA recording label, released songs under the name Habana Oculta. In July 1996, most of them travelled to Spain (except for Carlos Santos, Raúl Ciro and Alejandro Frómeta: Superávit) to showcase their music at several festivals and clubs. They soon spurred interest among audiences and the media alike, as well as well-known Spanish artists and musicians. Ana Belén and Víctor Manuel, along with Ketama, were the first to show an interest and to take the initiative in a gradual and rich exchange with Habana Abierta, with whom they made music in Spain. BMG Ariola asked Gema y Pável to come up with a project that brought together a group of highly different singer-songwriters on the album, based on the individuality of each member as well as the combined expression of the diverse unity of Cuban music. Vanito Brown and Alejandro Gutiérrez joined what was to become Habana Abierta, recording a new album under this name.

They played over eighty gigs throughout Spain in 1997, fifty of them in Madrid, and in 1998 recorded an album with the lineup down to six, as Andy and Barbería had left to branch out on their own. With 24 Horas, the second album with Habana Abierta, an eclectic line was followed by tracks from previous recordings, with a more defined fusion between popular Cuban music and funk, reggae, and hip-hop. Rock and pop Cuban-style with national roots: Van Van by Juan Formell, Irakere by Chucho Valdés, or NG La Banda by José Luis Cortés, refrains attributed to Matamoros over Red Hot Chili Peppers or Rolling Stones riffs. Conga-funk, timba-rock, bolero-hop, chachacha-blues, son and pop. In January 2003, after six years in Spain, they returned to Cuba for a series of sell-out individual shows, with a performance by the Habana Abierta full lineup at La Tropical, playing to an audience of 10,000. This gave rise to the Habana Abierta documentary directed by Jorge Perugorría and Arturo Soto, which was presented at several film festivals.

== Band members ==
- Vanito Brown: Chronicler of personal issues, a versatile songwriter. The scale of his work ranges from contemporary rock ballads to traditional Cuban music. Currently recording a solo album with producer Robin Taylor-Firth for the BlancoMusic.com label.
- Alejandro Gutiérrez: It would be fair to say he is a modern-day bolerista, with Filin (feeling) and urban song influences of the continental south, though he is able to create the most contemporary rock; the beauty of his singing and compositions is outstanding.
- Luis Alberto Barbería: The resonance of his voice and guitar work takes on Afro-Cuban rhythms. His melodies are lyrical with jazz influences. His poetry, colloquially uninhibited due to its exquisite Cubanness. He has worked with Ketama on their recordings and tours.
- Jose Luis Medina: Refined pop successfully blended with son, guajira and guaracha, able to come up with the barest social criticism or the most conciliatory ballad.

Boris Larramendi, Kelvis Ochoa, Andy Villalón and Pepe del Valle have also been members of the band.

== Discography ==
In 1998 they recorded Habana Oculta, with the participation of Alejandro Frómeta and Raúl Ciro from Superávit. As Habana Abierta, they recorded Habana Abierta, 24 horas and Boomerang, this last one in 2006 with the collaboration of musicians such as Bebo Valdés and the arrangements of Alain Pérez.

Three of its members have recorded solo albums: Kelvis Ochoa recorded Kelvis, Boris Larramendi Yo no tengo la culpa and Luis Barbería, Luis Barbería. Kelvis Ochoa and Boris Larramendi were also the singers of Habana Blues Band, the band created after the success of the movie Habana Blues (directed by Benito Zambrano), winner of a Best Soundtrack Goya Award in 2006.

Currently Habana Abierta is about to present its new album, self-produced, and Vanito Brown is preparing his solo album with producer Robin Taylor-Firth.
