= Telmary Diaz =

Cuban rmusician, songwriter (born 1977)

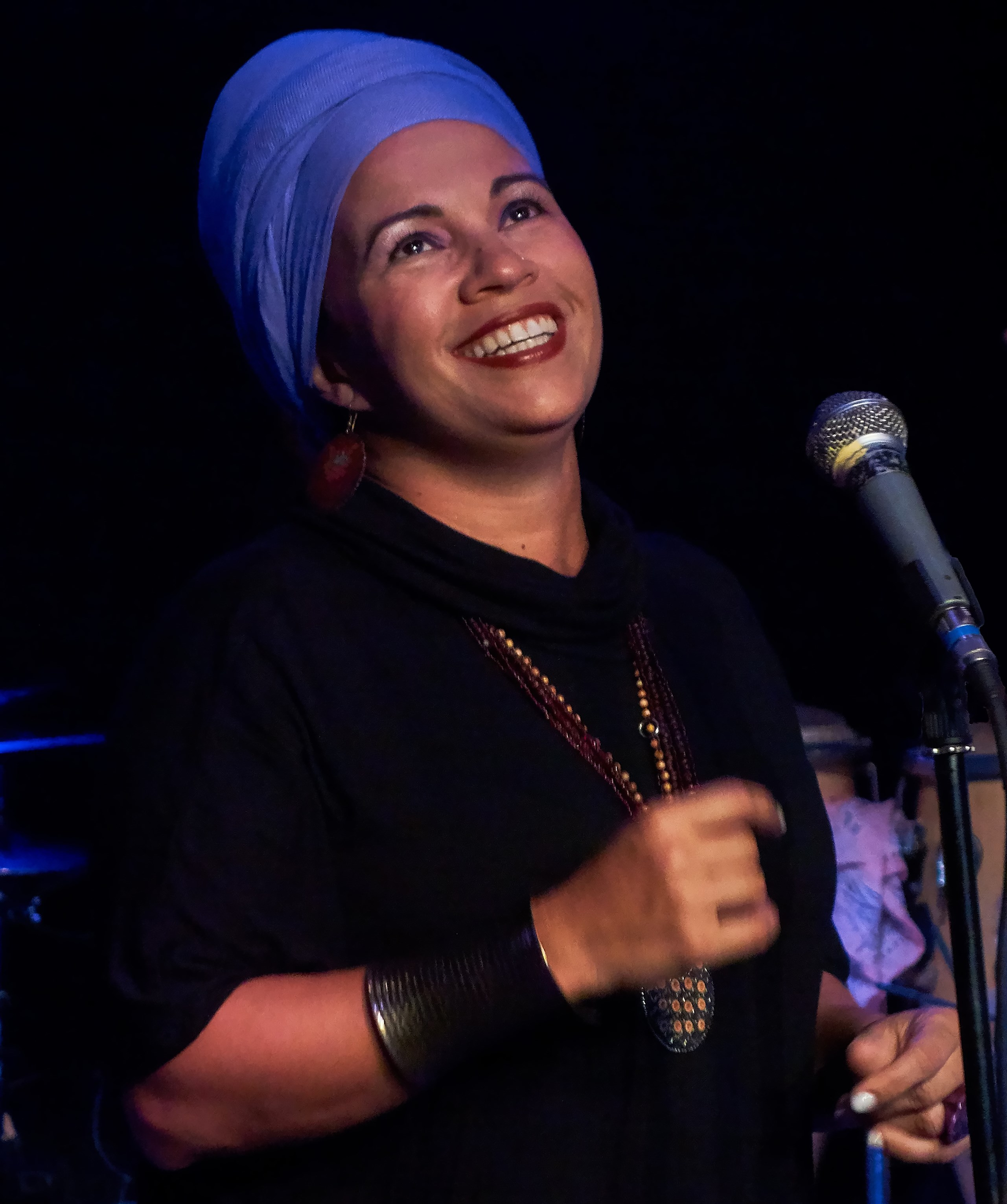
2016 in Havana

Telmary Díaz Fernández (March 10, 1977 in Havana), better known as simply Telmary, is a Cuban rapper, musician, and spoken-word artist.

== Early life ==
Although now hailed by many as the most authentic rapper in Cuba, Telmary began life quite differently. Born in Cuba to a journalist mother and sociologist father, Telmary initially aspired to follow her mother into journalism. However, everything changed the day she accepted a friend’s invitation to check out a spoken word freestyle event. After her first time on stage, Telmary decided on another direction, seeking music, poetry, and singing as a more fulfilling form of communication.

Telmary has also studied English language and literature, screenwriting and theatre. She cites her main goal in any of her endeavors as working towards better communication with her audience.

== Career ==
Telmary’s music is indicative of Cuba Contemporary Fusion in that it not only fuses Afro-Cuban and Latin beats, but also modernizes it with hints of funk, jazz, hip-hop, and urban slam poetry. She has developed and honed her style by collaborating with a bevy of other musicians. Her personal style is known by critics and audiences alike for its deft maneuvering between rapid-fire and spoken verses to soft jazz-inspired crooning and back again. Her work is also known for its personal and socially conscious content.

In 2007 she released her first solo album A Diario to rave reviews, culminating to her winning a Cubadisco Award for Best Hip Hop Album.

In 2018 the Album Fuerza Arara was nominated to the 19th Latin Grammys "Best alternative music album".

Since 2011 she is ambassador of the cuban jewelry brand ROX950.

== Other work ==
Film

- 2001 “Todas las noches terminan en el Malecon” – Cecilia Araujo, Brazil
- 2002 “MalaHabana” – Guido Giansoldati, Italy
- 2004 “Musica Cubana” - German Krall, Germany
- 2005 “Habana Blues” – Benito Zambrano, Spain

Soundtrack

- 2004 “Los Revolucionarios” – “Bye Bye Havana” – J. Michael Seyfert, Mexico

Theatre

- 2005 “Sonlar” – René de Cárdenas, Cuba

== Discography ==
- A Diarìo (2007)
- Afrikando (2013)
- Unspoken, Vol.1 (2013)
- Libre (2014)
- Love Art Revolution (2016)
- Fuerza Arará (2018)

== Awards and distinctions ==
- 2002 Latin Grammy Nomination to "Best Rap/Hip Hop Album" for "X More'"by X Alfonso
- 2005 Cubadisco Award Winner, Cubadisco Big Prize, Best Debut Album & Best Fusion (with group Interactivo)
- 2007 Cubadisco Award Winner, Best Hip-Hop Album for "A Diario"
- 2007 NOW Magazine’s “Best of Toronto” Awards – Best Latin Artist
- 2008 Juno Award Winning "Best contemporary Album for "Embracing Voices"by Jane Bunnett
- 2014 Cubadisco Award Winner, Best Hip-Hop Album for "Libre"
