= Haydée Milanés =

Cuban singer (born 1980)

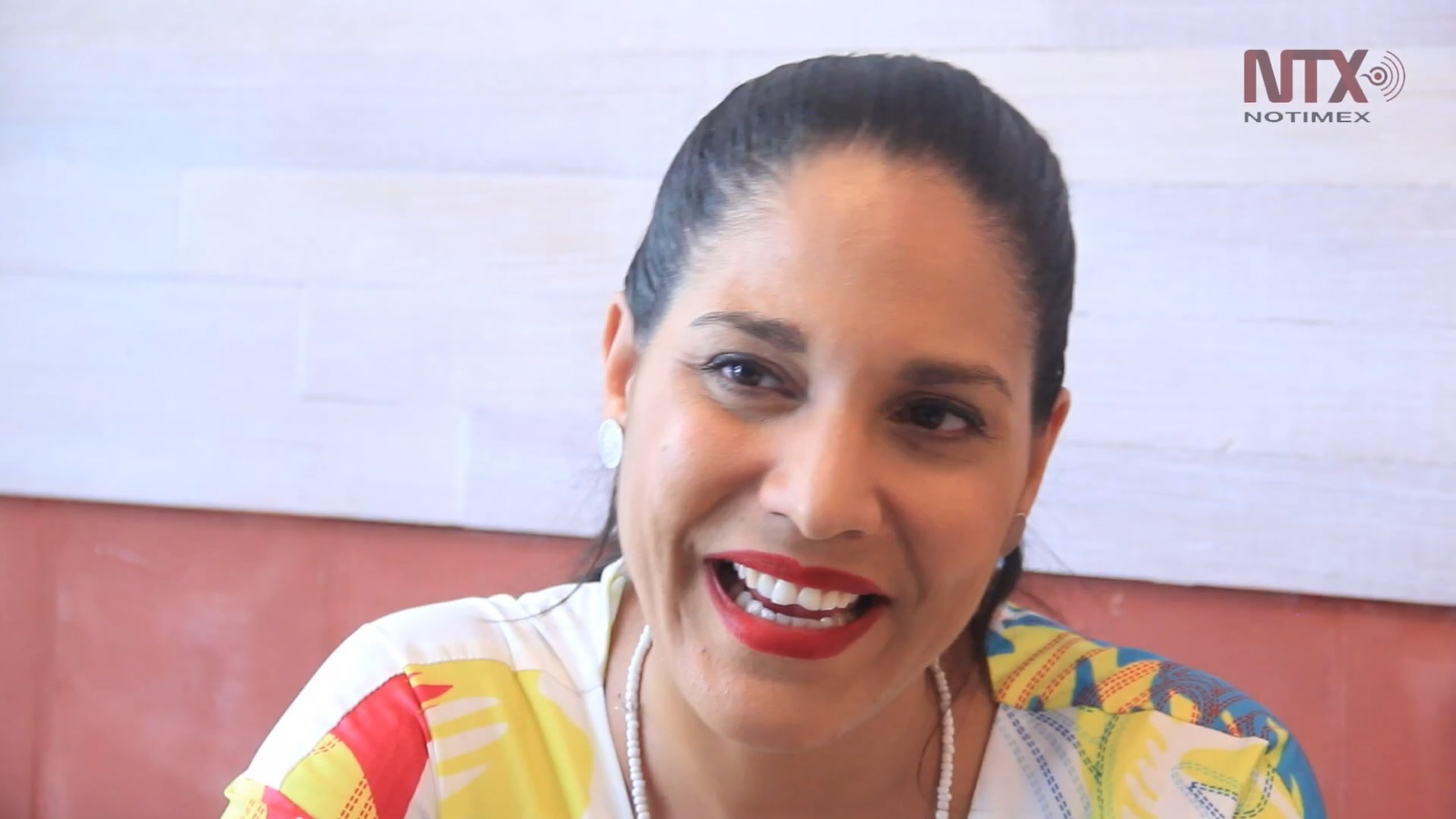
Milanés on an interview for NotimexTV promoting her concert in Mexico.

Haydée Milanés (born 1980 Havana; Spanish pronunciation: [ajˈðe(e) milaˈnes]) is a Cuban singer. She is the daughter of the important “Nueva Trova” figure Pablo Milanés. Haydée Milanés is part of the Cuban fusion new scene. Her style is often compared to that of Norah Jones: shy, sultry, and jazzy.

== Biography ==
Haydée Milanés grew up watching her father perform, practice, and write songs. At the age of 6, she began playing piano and singing at the Manuel Saumell Conservatory. She also started learning music theory and choral direction in the Amadeo Roldán Conservatory, and finished her studies in Switzerland where she studied old chant.

The first time Haydée Milanés stepped onto a stage, it was to accompany her father on one of his songs, when she was 10 years old. After that, she performed as a chorister in several concerts, and in Havana’s churches for Christmas.

== Professional Singer career ==
In 1999, she started to perform in the quartet of the Cuban pianist Hernán López Nussa. Her first musical tour occurred in 2000, as she was invited to the Heineken Festival in São Paulo (Brazil). This collaboration with Hernán López Nussa led her to record an album in Rio de Janeiro with renowned Cuban musicians such as Tata Güines or Pancho Ferry.

The same year, she started performing frequently in Havana club la Zorra y el Cuervo. There, she regularly participated in jam sessions with Roberto Carcassés, director of the “Interactivo” music collective, with whom she collaborated in 2003 on the compilation Cool Cool Filin.

Her first solo album, Haydée, came out in 2004 and was produced and written by Descemer Bueno between Havana and New York. This album gave rise to a series of concerts in Havana, warmly welcomed by the audience and the critics.

In 2008, Haydée Milanés released a live album called Haydée Milanés en Vivo, featuring performances with her father Pablo Milanés and her sisters Lynn and Suylén Milanés. Since the death of her father in 2022, Milanés has distanced herself from regime "cultural institutions on the island." In November 2023 she sang a new version of the hymn "Virgen Mambisa" with exiled Cuban musicians in Miami that called for the liberation of Cuba.
