= Grupo Galé =

Colombian salsa music band

- Genres: salsa music
- Label: Codiscos

Grupo Galé is a Colombian salsa music band. Their album Auténtico was nominated for Latin Grammy Award for Best Salsa Album at the Latin Grammy Awards of 2008. Their record label is Codiscos.

== Discography ==
- Frívolo (1989)
- Nuestra Salsa (1990)
- Sensitivo (1991)
- A Conciencia (1992)
- Sin Apariciencias (1994)
- Afirmando (1995)
- Dominando La Salsa (1996)
- Grandes Hits (1997)
- En Su Sitio (1997)
- Salsadiccion (1997)
- Internacional (1998)
- 10 Años (1999)
- Con El Mismo Swing (2001)
- 20 De Julio (2002)
- Esencia Latina (2004)
- Pa' Colombia y Nueva York (2006)
- Auténtico (2008)
