= Bamboleo (band) =

Bamboleo is a Havana-based Cuban salsa and timba band formed in 1995, and emblematic of the "timba brava" generation of Cuban bands in the 90s. Their albums also include boleros and reggaeton.

The group was founded by Lázaro Valdés, a keyboard player, and initially fronted by two female singers, with a distinctive female "voice" and perspective in the lyrics. This was reflected on the first album cover, Te Gusto O Te Caigo Bien? (1996) which featured prominently the singing duo Haila Mompié and Vannia Borges, but Haila Mompié left the band after the first album and Valdés contracted various other singers. Overall the feminine voice element of the band was later pulled back, with Valdes explaining in interview "That was important until the public got used to the sound of our music. The singers are the visual element, but you really have to get people accustomed to your particular sound."

== Discography ==
- Te Gusto O Te Caigo Bien? (1996, Bis Music )
- Yo No Me Parezco A Nadie (1998, Ahí Namá)
- Ya No Hace Falta (1999, Ahí Namá)
- Ñño! Qué Bueno Está (2000, Ahí Namá)
- Quimica De Amor (2002)
- El Virus (2005, self-released)
- Mi Verdad (2006, Latin Pulse Music)
- En Vivo Galiano at la Casa de la Música (2007, Latin Pulse Music)
- Quien Manda? (2010, Bis Music)
