= René de Cárdenas =

Cuban dancer and choreographer

René de Cárdenas is a Cuban dancer and choreographer born in Havana. A former member of the Cuban National Ballet, he is also the creator of Sonlar, a musical performed worldwide, describing a day in the life of a solar in a Havana barrio (a kind of communal tenement house where several families live together).
