= Alain Pérez =

Cuban bassist and vocalist

Alain Pérez (born April 20, 1977 in Trinidad, Cuba), is a Cuban bassist.

Alain Perez was born in Manaca-Iznaga, a town in the Valle de los Ingenios in Sancti Spiritus very close to Trinidad. His father was the composer Gradelio Perez. Alain Pérez is a Cuban musician, producer, and composer known for his contributions to the world of Latin and Afro-Cuban music. With a career spanning over three decades, Pérez has released numerous albums that have been critically acclaimed and have garnered him a global fan base.

== Career ==
His professional career began in large part thanks to Chucho Valdes who recognized his talent and took him to work in Irakere. There he worked from 1994 as a singer and keyboard player, until he emigrated to Spain in 2001.

He has worked as a sideman for Paco De Lucia and Jerry Gonzalez and many others.

== Awards ==
- 2022 – Latin Grammy, Best Traditional Tropical Album

== Discography ==
- 1992 – A Punto de Caer
- 1997 – Adelante Siempre Vamos a Llegar
- 2001 - El desafío
- 2003 – Canciones Inéditas
- 2009 – Homenaje a Tito Puente
- 2013 – En El Aire (Ayva Musica)
- 2014 – Hablando con Juana
- 2015 – El alma del son
- 2016 – Un Corazón Músical
- 2018 – ADN
- 2020 – Metamorfosis
- 2020 – El cuento de la buena pipa
- 2021 – Cha Cha Chá: Homenaje A Lo Tradicional
- 2025 – Bingo
