= Tabou Combo =

Haitian Band

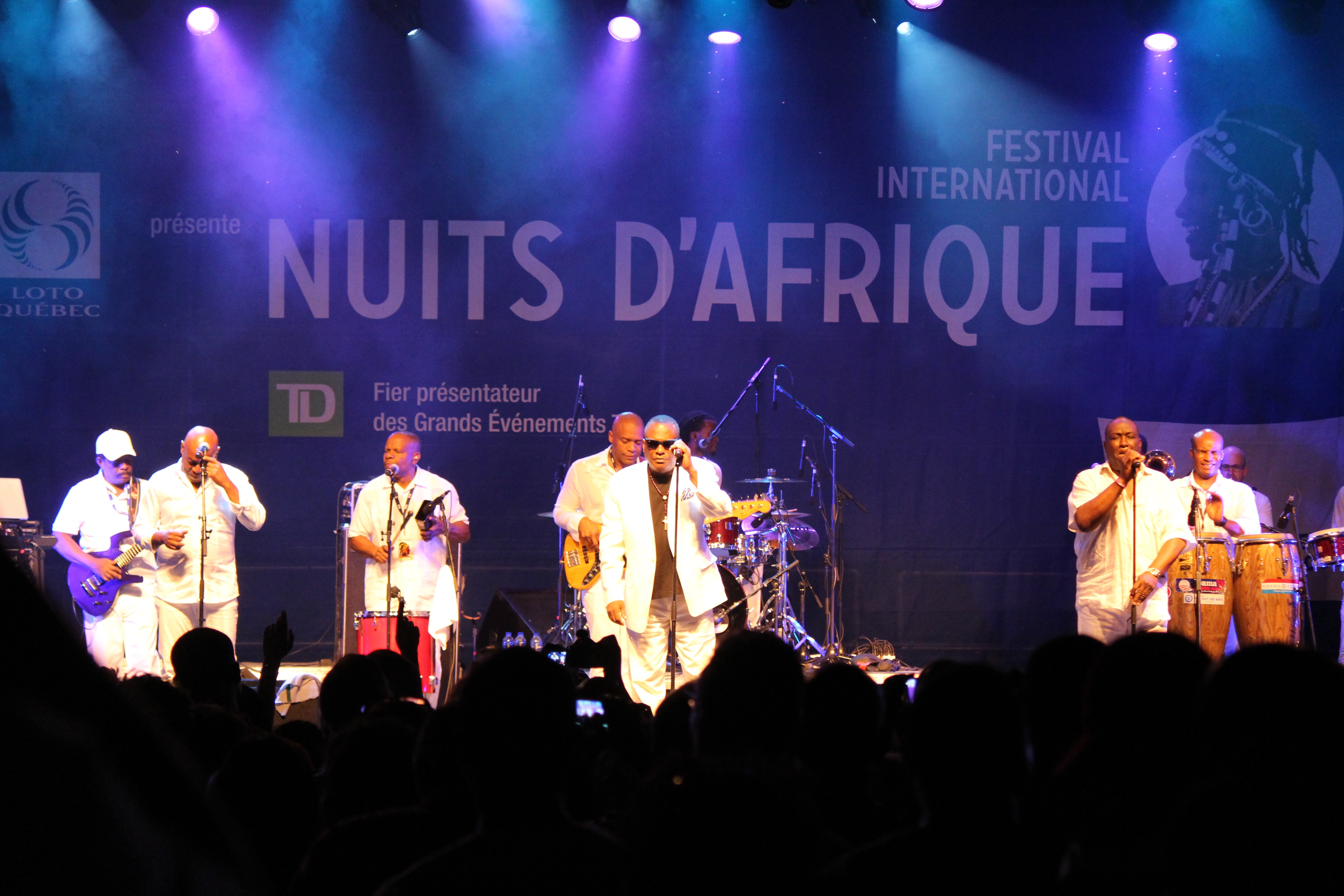
- Tabou Combo at the 2014 Festival International Nuits d'Afrique in Montréal

Background information
- Origin: Pétion-Ville, Haiti
- Genre: Compas
- Years active: 1968–present
- Website: taboucombo.com

Tabou Combo is a Haitian compas band that was founded in 1968 in Pétion-Ville, a suburb of Port-au-Prince. The orchestra has performed throughout the world (North America, South America, Europe, Africa, Asia, and especially in the Caribbean). Tabou Combo was the first Haitian band to perform in Japan, Ivory Coast, Senegal among others, and were named the "Official Panamanian Band" in Panama due to their popularity, while also becoming the first Caribbean band to have a number one single in the French Hit Parade. They dynamically sung their songs in both English, French, Spanish and in Haitian Creole. Tabou Combo refer to themselves as the "ambassadors of konpa."

== History ==
In 1968, band founders Albert Jr. Chancy and Herman Nau, performed their first concert. At first they named themselves, Los Incognitos because they were virtually unknown, but soon changed it in to "Tabou Combo" the following year to better fit Haitian culture. That year, the band won "Best Musical Group of the Year" in a televised talent contest, gaining a national reputation in Haiti and the sight of a promising international career.

== Musical style ==
Tabou Combo's musical repertoire, is a mixture of vodou ceremonial rara drums, Haiti's French colonial kontradans and quadrilles, African soukous and funk from the American soul era, while commanding a dominant presence of compas.

== Band members ==
Current members

- Herman Nau – co-founder, drums, vocals, composer, artistic director (1968–2021) (died 25 July 2021)
- Yves Joseph "Fanfan" – percussion, vocals (1968–)
- Roger Marie Eugene "Shoubou" – lead vocals (1968–)
- Jean-Claude Jean – rhythm guitar (1968–)
- Yvon "Kapi" André – percussion, vocals (1968–)
- Fritz Coulanges – violin (1968–)
- Elysee Pyronneau – lead guitar, keyboards (1976–)
- John Campagna – alto saxophone (1978–)
- Andrew Washington – trombone (1980–)
- Reynald "Rey" Valme – congas (1987–)
- Yves Abel – bass (1988–)
- Ken Watters – trumpet (1989–)
- Ralph Conde – guitar solo (1995–)
- Andre Atkins – trombone (1996–)
- Robenson Jean-Baptiste – drums (2006–)
- Curtis Eby – trumpet
- Darren Barrett – trumpet
- Yacine Boulares;- saxophone (2013-)

Former members

- Albert Chancy Jr. – co-founder, band leader, lead guitar (1968–69)
- Adolphe Chancy – bass (1968–88), band leader (1976–88)
- Paul Gonel – accordion (1968)
- Serge Guerrier – lead vocals (1968–72)
- André "Dadou" Pasquet – lead guitar (1970–76)
- Guerry Legagneur – accordion (1971–75)
- Yvon Cine – bass, vocals (1972–76)
- Pierre André Cine – guitar, percussion (1973–76)
- James Kelly – tenor saxophone (1978–81)
- Glenn Ferris – trombone (1978–80)
- Paul F. Henegan – saxophone (1981–87)
- Charlie Miller – trumpet (1981–83)
- Joe Mosello – trumpet (1983–87)
- Ernst Marcelin – keyboards (1987–92)
- Ned Gold – tenor saxophone (1987–95)
- Pete Macnamara – trumpet (1988–95)
- Tim Newman - trombone (1987-92)
- Jaime Ramos - trombone (1988-90)
- Gary Resil – rhythm guitar (1988–95)
- Daniel "Danny" Pierre – keyboards / vocals (1994–2002)

Max “Soso” Paris (Former TEMPO band member) Keyboard 2017- to present

- Luis Disla-Tenor Sax (2008-2013)
- Dener Ceide – lead guitar (co-founder of Zafem)

== Discography ==
- Haïti / Ya Patia (1969)
- Disque Souvenir de... (1970)
- À La Canne à Sucre (1972)
- Respect... (1973)
- 8th Sacrement (1974)
- The Masters (1975)
- Indestructible... (1976)
- L'An 10 (1977)
- The Music Machine (1978)
- Voyé Monté (1979)
- Baissez-Bas (1980)
- Bolero Jouk Li Jou (1981)
- Et Alors (1981)
- Cé Konsa Cé Konsa / Partagé (1982)
- Min Sirop (1983)
- Jo Jo Nan Carnaval (1983)
- Enregistré en public - Vol.1 (1984)
- Allo Allo (Toujou, Souça) (1984)
- Enregistré En Public - Vol.1 (1984)
- Anthology, Vol I (1979-1986) (1986)
- Anthology, Vol II (1979-1986) (1986)
- Anthology, Vol III (1979-1986) (1986)
- Anthology, Vol IV (1979-1986) (1986)
- Anthology, Vol V (1979-1986) (1986)
- Incident (1986)
- Quitem Fe Zafem (1987)
- Aux Antilles (1989)
- Live au Zénith (Les plus grands succès) (1989)
- 8th Sacrement (1989) (rereleased in CD format)
- Gozalo (En Español) (1990)
- Zap Zap (1991)
- Go Tabou Go (1993)
- Rasanble (1994) (MC)
- Unity (1994) ("Rasanble", CD format)
- Best of Tabou Combo (1995)
- Référence (1996)
- 30 Ans Jusqu'au Zenith (1998)
- Over drive (1998)
- 360 Degrees (1998)
- Best of... Le Son Haïti (1999)
- L'An 10 (1999) (rereleased in CD format)
- Happy Birthday : 30 Ans De Succès (2000)
- Sans Limites (2000)
- Le Meilleur De Tabou Combo (2002)
- 35th Anniversary (2003)
- Gold (2003)
- Les Grands Succès (2003)
- Fiesta Caribena / Caribbean Fete (2005)
- Taboulogy (2005)
- Best Of Platinum Vol.1 (2006)
- Best Of Platinum Vol.2 (2006)
- Best Of Platinum Vol.3 (2006)
- Best Of Platinum Vol.4 (2006)
- Best Of Platinum Vol.5 (2006)
- Olympia Collection 2007 (2007)
- Mizik Factory Live a Paris La Villette (2009)
- Konpa to the world (2011)

== Singles ==
- New York City / Education (1974)
- New York City (Part One / Part Two) (1975)
- Inflacion / Loneliness (1975)
- Lets Do The Groove (1977)
- Let Me Play That Funky Music (1978)
- Antillian Woman - The Big Single (1979)
- Ooh La La (Disco version) (1979)
- You, You, You (1980)
- Baisser Bas (1983)
- New York City / Et Alors (1984)
- New York City (1992)
- New York City / Pace Dominé (1992)
- Why Not? (1997)

== In popular culture ==
- The song "Juicy Lucy", was featured in a 1985 French film Police.
- The songs "Incident" and "Ma Bouya", was featured in the 1988 film The Serpent and the Rainbow.
- The song "La Mare A (Karnaval)", was featured in the 1991 film The Hard Way.
- The song "Cole", was featured in the 1991 film The Five Heartbeats.
- The songs "Kitem Fe Safem", and "Zap, Zap", was featured in the 1991 film Mystery Date.
