= Haila Mompié =

Haila María Mompié González (born 28 January 1974), better known as Haila Mompié or simply Haila, is a Cuban singer, specializing in son and timba. She is known as the lead vocalist in Azúcar Negra, as a former Bamboleo singer, and for her solo career.

== Life and career ==
Haila was born on 28 January 1974 in Amancio, Las Tunas, Cuba.

She started her musical schooling at age nine in Santiago de Cuba, where she studied dance. At age 15 her family moved to Havana, which stopped her career shortly. There, she met the famous son-singer Yaquelín Castellanos, who was very fond of Haila's singing ability. Haila was offered a position in the group Septeto Tradición, which mostly played in the traditional style of the son septetos of the 1920s/30s. Later she performed in the cabaret Las Avenidas and joined the group Habana Son. With the project Guajira Habanera she had her first foreign performance in 1994 in Mexico.

In September 1994, she joined the group Bamboleo as a vocalist. She recorded two albums with them and performed in different countries, gaining a reputation as a singer.

Together with the musician and composer Leonel Limonta, Haila started in 1998 Azúcar Negra, a timba band signed to Bis Music. They had successful performances in Europe and Latin America. The song "Andar Andando" became their biggest hit.

=== Solo career ===
In the year 2000 Haila started her solo career. She collaborated on La rumba soy yo, a various artists rumba album that received the Latin Grammy Award for Best Folk Album in 2001. That year se released her eponymous debut album, which was followed by a live album in 2002.

In 2004, she released Diferente, produced by David Calzado, the leader of Charanga Habanera. In 2011 she released Mala, produced by Aned Mota, her husband and former vocalist of Charanga Habanera. Mala won the Cuba Disco Award in the Latin Music category in 2012. Her latest album is Cómo voy a decirte, released in 2015.

== Discography ==
- Haila (2001)
- Live (2002)
- Diferente (2004)
- Tal como soy (2008)
- Mala (2011)
- Mi Ritual (2015)
- Mujer de Acero (2017)
- Sonando Duro (2019)
- Con todo respeto Haila canta a Armando manzanero (2019)
- Con un canto a la sonrisa (2020)
