= J. Michael Seyfert =

German Mexican documentary film director (born 1959)

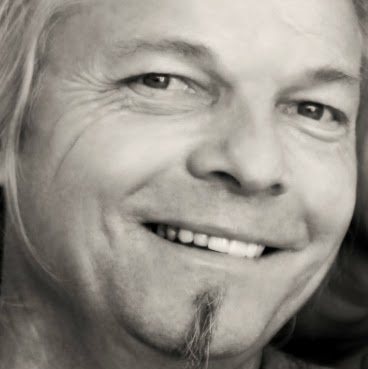
- Born: 1959 (age 66–67); Germany
- Occupations: Director, photographer
- Website: www.seyfert.com

J. Michael Seyfert (born 1959) is a German Mexican documentary film director best known for the documentaries Rent a Rasta and Bye Bye Havana. Among other awards, at the Atlanta International Documentary Film Festival, Seyfert was awarded Best Post-Production for Bye Bye Havana in 2006, and Best Director for Rent a Rasta in 2007.

== Professional life ==
Seyfert began his professional life 1977 as music industry writer and photographer with Fachblatt Musikmagazin, a Cologne, Germany based monthly for which he subsequently worked as Los Angeles bureau chief.

In 1992 Seyfert relocated to New York City to work as interactive media content producer and internet entrepreneur. As Creative Director Seyfert took major brands such as Steve Madden (company), Le Cordon Bleu and RE/MAX of New York online.

During the early days of costly dial up internet access Seyfert developed and trademarked a "Free Internet" model wherein an advertiser driven portal would absorb the user's cost of dial up service. This model was later adapted and its trademark acquired by Freei Networks famous for its Baby Bob commercial. FreeiNet eventually transferred its assets to NetZero.

In early 2000 the U.S. Federal Reserve increased interest rates six times and the economy began to lose speed, also resulting in the burst of the Internet bubble.

Seyfert relocated to a rustic Baja desert village applying his acquired internet related skills to practice his own brand of freedom as geography was no longer an inextricable element of the workplace.

From 1995 and until 2007 Seyfert developed the high traffic portal Baja.com the sale of which he would use to finance an off-grid documentary film production company focusing on Latin America.

== Film projects ==
In 2002 Seyfert's vision for a cartel-free filmmaking enterprise began to take shape while exploring Latin America's inequities through the eyes of its dispossessed people: Widows of the Guatemalan ethnocide known as The Silent Holocaust near Rabinal, site of some of the bloodiest massacres in Guatemala's Civil War, coca farmers and abandoned Tungsten mine workers in the Bolivian Andes, an Amazon tribe being driven from the rain forest by loggers and oil companies, dreadlocked Jamaican descendants of slaves selling sex to middle aged women and the reclusive Rastafarian Mansion Bobo Ashanti of Bull Bay appeal for repatriation to Africa, recicladores dwelling on a 150-hectare Mexico City mega garbage dump and resilient Cubans in their daily struggle to survive in the ruins of Central Havana, 10-year-old street children living among deported American Mara Salvatrucha gang members in a devastated El Salvador and heavily armed Brazilian favela gangsters in their quest for humanity. Seyfert's films are entirely self-funded and produced with rudimentary tools and have remained relevant long after they were made. They are the subject of citation in academic articles and dissertations.

Portland State University "Issues of Authenticity in Small Scale Tourism: A Study of the McDisney Experience".

"The Rastafarian Movement in Jamaica" Masaryk University, Czech Republic.

== Filmography ==
=== Bye Bye Havana ===
(2004) Carlos Alberto Montaner of Foreign Policy calls Seyfert's film "A colorful and sobering picture of the Cuba that Fidel has left behind". The film premiered on March 2, 2006 at New Hampshire International Film Festival and screened at select venues around the world, including the 20th Fort Lauderdale Intl. Film Festival. and 8. Festiwal Podróżników na Głodówce. Bye Bye Havana was broadcast four times on Free Speech TV Dish Channel 9415 in the United States and on Mongolian National TV and continues to figure prominently among post-revolutionary documentaries.

=== Waorani: Last of the Rain Forest People ===
(2005) The Waorani are an ancestral nation in the Ecuadorian Amazon. Since Oil Companies have entered their territory, the Waorani have made deals, *oil for a pack of noodles and two soccer balls*, deals in exchange for nothing. The film was released in English, German and Spanish broadcast in Mexico on Canal 22 and screened at 6th Albacete Film Festival 2006 - Castilla-La Mancha, Spain and Festival du Cinéma de Paris 2006.

In order to prepare for the production of this film, Seyfert studied Sabela, the language only spoken by the Waorani. He compiled a "Spanish - Sabela" dictionary republished in the book "Los Huaorani del Cononaco" by Hernán Paz in 2007.

=== Rent a Rasta ===
(2006) Jamaica Documentary covering the phenomenon of middle-aged women traveling to Jamaica for sex each year as well as culture context in the Atlantic Slave Trade and history of the Jamaican Rastafari movement.

Rent a Rasta screened at Institute of Contemporary Arts in London on September 13, 2007, "A skillful, thoughtful and illuminating examination of the sex tourism industry in Jamaica, where white women come to sleep with young local 'rastatutes'".

On September 5, 2013 The Huffington Post's Caitlyn Becker interviews Seyfert about Rent a Rasta on Huffpost Live.

=== The Pause That Refreshes ===
(2007) Short documentary about El Salvador street children who live among thousands of Mara Salvatrucha gang members deported from the United States.

=== Opposite Land ===
(2008) Latin America migration documentary. The film premiered on August 24, 2008 at Atlanta Underground Film Festival. and won the Best Director Award at the 2nd Annual Montezuma International Film Festival in Costa Rica November 14, 2008

=== Love in the Time of Coca Cola ===
(2009) The documentary follows men meeting mail order brides in Bogotá's thriving matrimony industry.

=== The Emperor In Your Mind ===
(2010) Short film portrait of a small town Mexican truck tire changer reflecting on his grandiose life.

=== Brazil Is Not Copacabana ===
(2012) A satirized documentary about poverty and the asymmetric resistance flourishing in Rio de Janeiro's favelas.

== Collaborations ==
From 1996 to 2005 Seyfert worked with British rock musician Roger Bunn, first guitarist of Roxy Music as American editor of MIHRA, The Music Industry Human Rights Organization based in London. In 2003 Bunn was narrator of Bye Bye Havana as well as contributor to the film's soundtrack from his posthumously released album Piece of Mind.

In 2003 Paul Cooke, founding member and drummer of the British smooth jazz rock band SADE collaborated with Seyfert on several projects including the soundtrack of Bye Bye Havana.

In 2008 Bolivian cinematographer and Smithsonian Bicentennial Medal recipient Jorge Ruiz contributed to Seyfert's film Opposite Land historic footage taken on Lake Titikaka in 1950 to juxtapose Seyfert's contemporary footage of Titino floating island and reveal 50 years of stagnation.

In the summer of 2022 Seyfert edited the official film trailer for VENI ETIAM an award winning poetic transgender documentary about Venice´s first female gondolier directed by Alex Hai and Mahtab Mansoor which screened at the 79th International Venice Film Festival on September 8, 2022
