= Carimi =

Haitian band

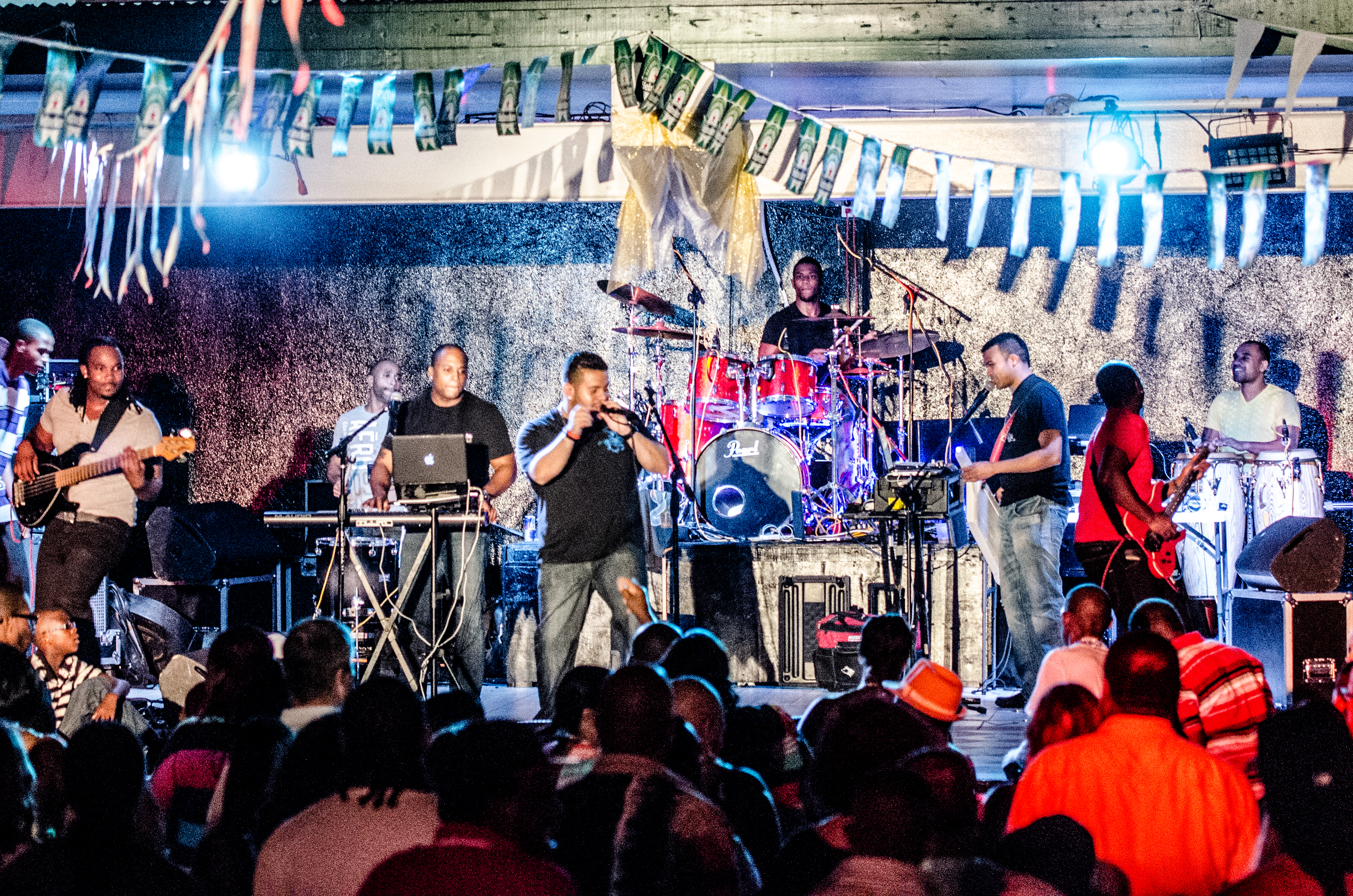

Background information
- Origin: New York City
- Genres: Konpa
- Years active: 2001–Present
- Members: Carlo Vieux, Richard Cavé, Michael Guirand, Glenny Benoit, Stanley Jean, Jean-Marie, Noldy Cadet, Alex Thebaud
- Website: www.carimi.com

Carimi (often styled as CaRiMi) was a popular Haitian compas band assembled in New York City in 2001.

== Biography ==
=== History ===
Carlo Vieux, Richard Cavé and Mikael Guirand who had worked together in some area of music, almost simultaneously made the decision to further their education. Acknowledging that the state of their homeland, Haiti, was troubled and unstable, they each decided to leave and set their sights on the United States. Always driven by their passion for music, this small group reunited in New York to touch upon making their current past-time a potential career.

The three shared desire to pursue their music and created the name for their band by the taking the first two letters of their first names Carlo Vieux, Richard Cavé and Mikael Guirand; thus, Carimi .

The group released the album Ayiti Bang, Bang in the summer of 2001. Instantly, Carimi became a household name. They are known as one of the first younger generation digital bands to put out music that reflected upon the political pressures and the deteriorating security of Haiti. They had mass appeal to the Haitian diaspora who fled the country.

In 2016 the singer Mickael Guirand decided to quit the band due to personal issues. The rest of the founding members decided to end their long journey and have gone on separate musical expeditions. Richard Cavé went on to found the group KAI, Carlo Vieux joined the group 5lan, and Mickael Guirand formed the group Vayb. In 2022 the band returned for a 20th anniversary one-day tour in Paris where they performed for the first time since the break up in 2016.

== Members ==
Current

- Carlo Vieux – keyboard, lead vocals
- Richard Cavé – keyboard, lead vocals
- Mickael Guirand – lead vocals
- Glenny Benoit – guitar
- Dominick Sylvain – drums
- Jean-Marie Casimir;– congas
- Noldy Cadet – bass
- Marc C. Widmack – congas
- Alex Thebaud – percussion, vocals
- Jeffrey Raymond - bass

== International stage ==
Carimi received accolades from the International music scene, including Best Album of the Year. Carimi has risen to the top of the charts across the billboards in Haiti, Guadeloupe, Paris, French Guiana, Canada and parts of Europe. They became the first Haitian band to come out with a kompa mobile app. On December 27, 2024, Carimi made history as the first Haitian band to have a concert in an arena in the United States. The concert which was held at the UBS Arena was 100% sold out.

== Discography ==
- Bang Bang (2001)
- Poze Aki (2002)
- Nasty Biznis (2004)
- Nasty Biznis: Live in Concert (2005)
- Are U Ready? (2006)
- Buzz (2009)
- Invasion (2013)
- Kite m' cho (2016)
