= David Calzado =

Cuban musician

Sergio David Calzado Almenares is the bandleader, music director, arranger, and lead vocalist of 16-piece musical ensemble, Charanga Habanera. David Calzado has played an essential role in the evolution of modern Cuban music, although he was forced to reorganize his music group in 1997. There is a movie called "Popular!" that tells the story of David Calzado and his orchestra.
