= Yusa =

Cuban singer and songwriter

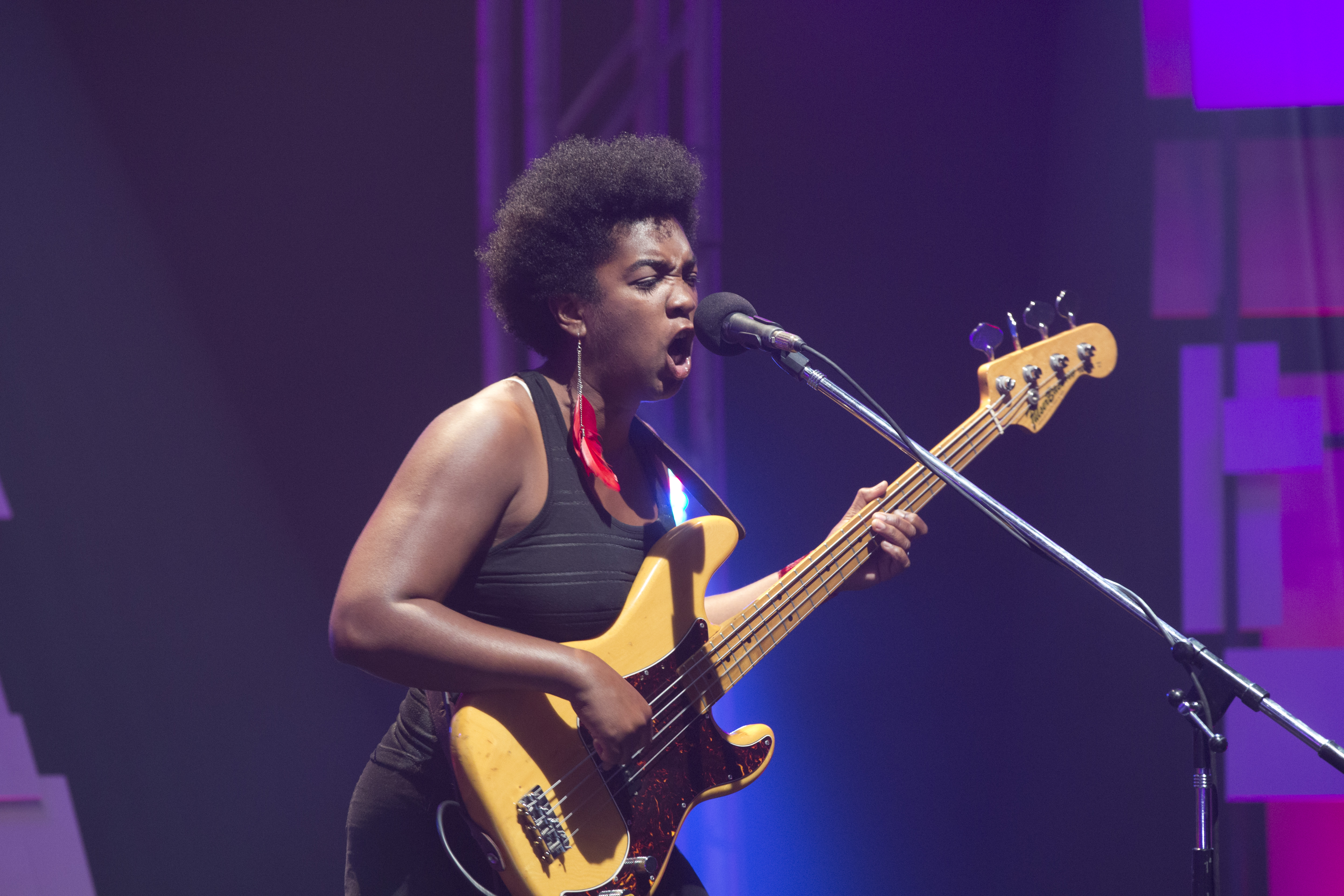

Background information
- Origin: Havana, Cuba
- Occupation: Musician
- Instruments: Guitar, bass, keyboard, percussion, voice
- Years active: 2002-present
- Label: Tumi Music
- Website: http://www.yusa.co.uk/

Yusa is a Cuban singer and songwriter, born in the Buena Vista district of Havana, Cuba. Her music is recognised worldwide : in 2003, she was nominated at the prestigious BBC Radio 3 World Music Awards in two categories (Best Newcomer and Best of the Americas.)

== Biography ==
=== Early life and education ===
Born in the Buena Vista district and brought up in the modern Alamar’s housing community of east Havana, Yusa's childhood was cradled by music. She started studying guitar at the age of 6, at the Alejandro García Caturla elementary school. Then, attending the Amadeo Roldán Music Conservatory, she chose to concentrate on a particular type of Cuban guitar called the tres and started performing in Havana's bars and clubs.

=== Career ===
Her songs are influenced by the life in Havana and by traditional Cuban music, even though she modernizes it, taking the true substance and arranging it, following the contemporary trends of the new Cuban wave.

== Discography ==
- Yusa (Tumi Music, 2002)
- Breathe (Tumi Music, 2005)
- Haiku (Tumi Music, 2008)

== Awards ==
- 2003: Cubadisco, Fusion category, Yusa
