= Kelvis Ochoa =

Cuban musician (born 1970)

Kelvis Ochoa (born 1970) is a Cuban singer, songwriter, and composer. He co-composed the original soundtrack for the film Habana Blues and is a member of the Cuban band Habana Abierta. Ochoa is one of the musicians featured in the album Putumayo Presents Café Cubano and in the documentary Havana, Havana!.

== History ==
=== Childhood ===
Ochoa was born in Las Tunas, Cuba, in 1970. At the age of 3, he moved with his parents to Isla de la Juventud ('Isle of Youth'), where he was raised. The island is located approximately 100 kilometers south of Havana.

Ochoa's father was a percussionist in his grandfather's band, and their performances inspired Ochoa to pursue music. He began playing conga tunes with friends in the streets and made his stage debut at the age of 14, singing a song by Cuban Sucu Sucu musician Mongo Rives at an inter-school festival. He later took guitar lessons and began writing poetry and songs.

=== Musical style ===
Ochoa's hometown, Isla de la Juventud, is known as the birthplace of Sucu Sucu: a musical tradition characterized by a soloist improvising in response to a repeated chorus, accompanied by various instruments. Kelvis Ochoa blends traditional Cuban rhythms such as Sucu Sucu, Cha Cha Cha, Macuta, and Songo with modern genres, including funk, rock, and international pop.

=== Career ===
After moving to Havana in 1992, Ochoa formed a rock band called "Cuatro Gatos" (Four Cats). He met Cuban musician Pável Urkiza, a member of the duo 'Gema y Pavel,' who produced Ochoa's contributions to "Habana Oculta", a July 1996 compilation of Cuban artists released on the Madrid-based Nubenegra label. This record led to the creation of the band Habana Abierta. The group released the album Havana Abierta under the Spanish label BMG Ariola. Habana Abierta gained popularity in Spain, selling out concerts in the 1990s, and performed in Cuba at La Tropical in 2003. A documentary about the band was directed by Jorge Perugorría and Arturo Soto.

Ochoa also released the solo album Kelvis with BMG Ariola in 2001. In 2009, he collaborated with fellow Cuban musician Descemer Bueno on the album Amor y Música, which was produced and co-written by Bueno and released on Cuba's EGREM label.

Ochoa and Bueno won the 2006 Goya Award and the 2006 Premio de la Musica for best movie soundtrack for Havana Blues.

In 2013-14, Swiss filmmaker Beat Borter directed a documentary titled Yo sé de un lugar - Música y vida de Kelvis Ochoa (I Know of a Place - The Music and Life of Kelvis Ochoa).

Since 2022 he is based in Miami.

== Awards ==
- 2006: Premio de la Musica for best movie soundtrack for Habana Blues (Madrid, Spain).
- 2006: Goya Award for best movie soundtrack for Habana Blues (Academia de las Artes y las Ciencias Cinematográficas de España).

== Discography ==
- 1996: Habana Oculta (compilation, BMG Ariola).
- 1997: Habana Abierta (with Habana Abierta, BMG Ariola).
- 1999: 24 Horas (with Habana Abierta, BMG Ariola).
- 1999: La Isla.
- 2001: Kelvis (BMG Ariola).
- 2005: Boomerang (with Habana Abierta).
- 2008: Amor Y Musica (EGREM).
- 2014: Dolor con amor se cura (BIS).
- 2018: Calle Amores (Universal).
- 2021: 50 Grados (BisMusic).
