= Graciela =

Cuban-American singer (1915 - 2010)

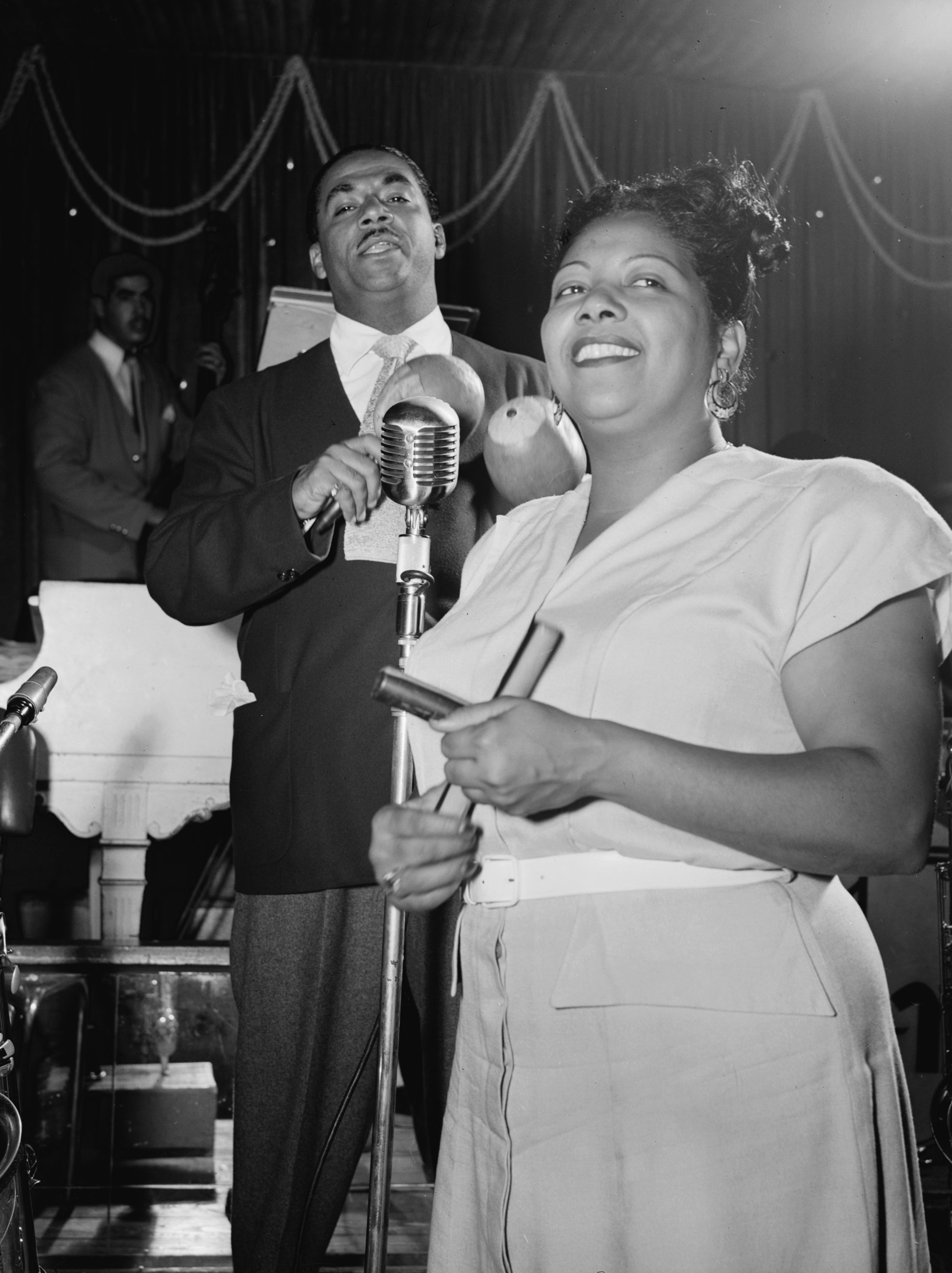
- Machito and Graciela singing

Background information
- Born: Felipa Graciela Pérez y Gutiérrez; August 23, 1915; Jesús María, Havana, Cuba
- Died: April 7, 2010 (aged 94) New York City
- Genre: Latin jazz
- Occupation: Singer
- Years active: 1934–2010

Felipa Graciela Pérez y Gutiérrez (August 23, 1915 – April 7, 2010), known by the mononym Graciela, was a Cuban singer of Cuban music and Latin jazz.

== Biography ==
Graciela was born in Havana, Cuba and raised in the Afro-Cuban Jesús María neighborhood. Graciela was the lead vocalist over a period of 10 years in the 1930s and '40s with Orquesta Anacaona, an all-female ensemble, before leaving Cuba for the United States. She performed around the world, recording and sharing the stage with her adoptive older brother, Frank Grillo (known as Machito), who encouraged her to sing. They played alongside Mario Bauzá (originator of the genre of Afro-Cuban Jazz) in the orchestra Machito and the Afro-Cubans.

She was summoned to New York City in 1943 by Mario Bauzá, when Machito was drafted into the army. She joined the orchestra as lead singer until Machito returned in 1944 and from then on the three shared the stage together until their split in 1975. For thirty-two years, they traveled the United States and the rest of the world and performed at the Palladium Ballroom from 1946 until its closing in 1966. Besides the Palladium, they would perform at the Royal Roost, Birdland, the Park Palace, the Corso and the Apollo Theater on a yearly week-long gig — and many other clubs and theaters in New York. Graciela and the orchestra also performed on a yearly basis in Hollywood — specifically at the Crescendo nightclub. Graciela and the band were also a favorite of the disc jockey Symphony Sid Torin who had them on his weekly program several times a year. They were also the summer headliners in the Concord Resort Hotel, in the Catskills Mountains, for more than twenty years.

They recorded albums in which her best-known recordings include "Esta es Graciela", "Íntimo y Sentimental" and "Esa Soy Yo, Yo Soy Así". In 2006, she was honored with the Latin Jazz USA Chico O'Farrill Lifetime Achievement Award. When she died in New York in 2010 at the age of 94, she was considered "The First Lady of Latin Jazz."

== Death ==
Felipa Graciela Pérez y Gutiérrez died at the age of 94 at New York Cornell-Presbyterian Hospital in New York City at 7:58 am, Wednesday, April 7, 2010. She had renal and pulmonary failure. She was cremated as per her wishes.

== Discography ==
Additionally, Graciela made supporting appearances on several recordings of Machito.

- 1951 - Arthur Murray mambo - ¿Dónde estabas tú? - Graciela with Machito and su Orquesta Afro-Cubana (Afro-Cubans (band)) (Columbia)
- 1961 - Machito at the Crescendo - Machito & His Famous Orchestra, featuring Graciela (GNP)
- 1962 - World's Greatest Latin Band - Machito & His Famous Orchestra, featuring Graciela (GNP)
- 1963 - Esta es Graciela - Graciela with Machito y su Orquesta (Tico)
- 1965 - Íntimo y sentimental - Graciela with Machito y su Orquesta (Tico)
- 1974 - Esa soy yo, Yo soy así - Graciela (Mericana Records, subsidiary of Caytronics)
- 1977 - La Botánica - Graciela and Mario Bauzá (Coco Records, subsidiary of Audio Fidelity)
- 1999 - Sí sí no no - Graciela and Mike Young (reissue of pre-1964 recording)
- 2000 - Cubop City - Graciela with Machito and his Afro-Cubans, Howard McGhee, Brew Moore, Flip Phillips (reissue of 1949 Roost single)
- 2004 - Inolvidable - Cándido Camero & Graciela Graciela (Chesky reissue of ca. late 1940s recordings)
