= Cuban Pete =

Cuban Pete may refer to one of the following:

- Cuban Pete (film), a 1946 film starring Desi Arnaz
- Cuban Pete, nickname of Mambo dancer Pedro Aguilar (1927–2009)
- "Cuban Pete" (song), a song performed by Mantovani & His Tipica Orchestra (1936), Louis Armstrong (1937), and Desi Arnaz (1946). Jim Carrey also sang it in The Mask.
