= Cándido Camero =

Cuban percussionist (1921–2020)

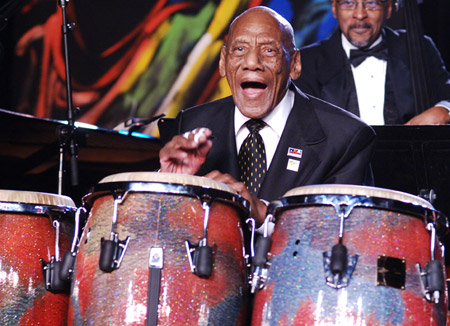
- Camero in 2008

Background information
- Born: Cándido Camero Guerra; 22 April 1921; Havana, Cuba
- Died: 7 November 2020 (aged 99) New York City, U.S.
- Genres: Afro-Cuban jazz; disco; descarga; son cubano
- Occupations: Musician; bandleader
- Instruments: Conga; bongo; tres; bass
- Labels: ABC-Paramount; Blue Note; Roulette; Polydor; Salsoul; Chesky

Cándido Camero Guerra (22 April 1921 – 7 November 2020), known simply as Cándido, was a Cuban conga and bongo player. He is considered a pioneer of Afro-Cuban jazz and an innovator in conga drumming. He was responsible for the embracing of the tuneable conga drum, the first high-profile congero to use multiple congas in combos, developing playing skills and techniques still widely used by percussionists, as Camero also assembled his own unique setup with congas, bongos, and other instruments (such as the foot-operated cowbell), and a stand-attached guiro, all played by one percussionist. Thus, he was an innovator in the realm of Latin multi-percussion setups, and many high-profile Latin percussionists point to Cándido as a mentor.

After moving to New York in 1946, Camero played with Dizzy Gillespie, Billy Taylor and Stan Kenton, and from 1956 he recorded several albums as a leader. His biggest success came in 1979 with his disco recordings for Salsoul. He continued to perform until the late 2010s, recording several albums for the audiophile label Chesky Records, including Inolvidable, with Graciela, which earned him a nomination at the 47th Annual Grammy Awards.

== Early life and family ==
Cándido Camero Guerra was born in the barrio known as El Cerro, in Havana, to Caridad Guerra and Cándido Camero. His interest in music began at the age of 4, when his maternal uncle Andrés, a professional bongosero for the Septeto Segundo Nacional, taught him to play bongos on condensed milk cans. At a very young age, he moved with his family to Cerro, a neighborhood in Havana. Camero's father taught him how to play the tres, a type of Cuban guitar. While focusing on the tres, he also learned to play bass and percussion, mostly bongo and conga. In 1935, at the age of 14, Camero began to play tres professionally for various son ensembles such as Gloria Habanera, Sonora Piñón and Conjunto Segundo de Arsenio Rodríguez (Arsenio's backup band). The increasing popularity of the conga drums—promoted primarily by Arsenio's conjunto—and the fact that Camero could not read sheet music, led him to switch to the conga, which became his primary instrument, although he would also record with other percussion instruments, especially the bongó.

== Early career ==
Early in his career, Camero played as conguero and bongosero for the Cuban radio stations Radio Progresso and Radio CMQ (for 6 years) and for the Tropicana Club (also for 6 years). As a tresero, he was also a member of Chano Pozo's Conjunto Azul, where he met Mongo Santamaría, who then played bongos. He moved to New York City in 1946, after first arriving in the city on a tour. He first performed in New York in the musical revue Tidbits at the Plymouth Theatre on Broadway in 1946 backing up the Cuban dance team of Carmen and Rolando.

== Influence ==
At the Tidbits show, Camero pioneered the playing of two conga drums simultaneously. In a traditional context in the Cuban rumba and conga line carnaval processional music, multiple drummers play a single conga. Camero would be the first to develop the technique to play various parts that originally individual single players would play in a group. He would recreate this by playing the various parts himself on multiple tuned drums. He also demonstrated to audiences for the first time the remarkable ability to play a steady rhythm with one hand while being able to improvise freely with the other. Thus he became the first to apply the technique of co-ordinated independence to the conga drums. He would later apply the technique to multiple percussion setups he would devise. For example expanding the number of congas to three or more combining them with other instruments such as the bongó. and inventing a foot-operated cowbell and a mountable guiro. These innovations and techniques were later adapted by other musicians leading to the manufacturer of various apparatuses to facilitate more expansive setups. His being the first to play multiple congas was quickly adapted by several of his fellow countryman like Carlos "Patato" Valdés and became the norm giving rise to the standard set of tuneable congas that are commonly used today. In 1957 he was also the first to champion the use of the fiberglass conga drum when he began playing publicly fiberglass drums made for him by New York City based Puerto Rican artisan and boat builder Frank Mesa.

== Later career ==
In 1948, he made his first U.S. recording with Machito and His Afro-Cubans on the tune "El Rey del Mambo", but he did not become a member of the band, since they already had Carlos Vidal Bolado on congas. When Chano Pozo was murdered in 1948 (he arrived in New York shortly after Cándido), Dizzy Gillespie contacted Camero and they began a fruitful collaboration that culminated in the 1954 recording of Afro. Camero was also a member of the Billy Taylor Trio, with whom he recorded in 1953–54, and in 1954 he performed and recorded with Stan Kenton. As one of the best known congueros in the U.S., Camero performed on variety shows such as The Jackie Gleason Show and The Ed Sullivan Show.

Camero recorded several albums as a leader for ABC-Paramount in the late 1950s and early 1960s. In the early 1970s, he recorded for the independent jazz label Blue Note Records, before joining the dance music record company Salsoul. With the latter, Camero recorded two albums which were relatively successful and remain in rotation by DJs in the U.S. In 1979, he released Jingo, a disco-oriented track written by Babatunde Olatunji and recorded on Salsoul Records; but released in the UK by EMI under the Salsoul Label as the B side to "Dancing and Prancing" as the A side. This track was also released as a 12" single in June, 1981 in the UK on the Excalibur Record label / PRT Precision Records and Tape, running for over 9 minutes, and reached #55 in the BBC Top 75 chart. "Jingo" was his most successful hit in the UK discos and clubs becoming a huge floor filler at that time and ever since as it has been covered by various artists since. In the 2000s, Camero was a member of the Conga Kings alongside Patato and Giovanni Hidalgo. They recorded two albums for Chesky. He recorded another album for Chesky in 2004, Inolvidable, with Graciela, the long-time lead singer for Machito. This album earned a Grammy Award nomination. In 2014, Camero recorded his last album, The Master, also for Chesky. He continued to perform in jazz clubs in New York until the late 2010s.

== Death ==
Camero died on 7 November 2020, at his home in New York. He was 99.

== Honors ==
Camero's album Inolvidable was nominated for Grammy Award for Best Tropical Latin Album in 2004. He received the National Endowment for the Arts Jazz Masters Award in 2008. He received a Latin Grammy Lifetime Achievement Award the following year.

A documentary about Camero titled Candido: Hands of Fire was released in 2006.

== Discography ==
Source: AllMusic, unless otherwise stated.

=== As leader: selected examples ===
- Candido featuring Al Cohn (ABC-Paramount, 1956)
- Calypso Dance Party (ABC-Paramount, 1957)
- The Volcanic (ABC-Paramount, 1957)
- In Indigo (ABC-Paramount, 1958)
- Latin Fire (The Big Beat of Candido) (ABC-Paramount, 1959)
- Conga Soul (Roulette, 1962)
- Candido's Comparsa (ABC-Paramount, 1963)
- Brujerías de Candido / Candido's Latin McGuffa's Dust (Tico Records, 1966)
- Thousand Finger Man (Solid State, 1969, reissued by Blue Note)
- Beautiful (Blue Note, 1970)
- Drum Fever (Polydor, 1973)
- Dancin' and Prancin' (Salsoul, 1979)
- Candy's Funk (Salsoul, 1979)
- The Conga Kings (Chesky, 2000) – with Giovanni Hidalgo and Carlos "Patato" Valdés
- Jazz Descargas (Chesky, 2001) – with Giovanni Hidalgo and Carlos "Patato" Valdés
- Inolvidable (Chesky, 2004) – with Graciela
- Hands of Fire/Manos de fuego (Live) (Latin Jazz USA, 2008)
- The Master (Chesky, 2014)

=== As sideman: selected examples ===
With Gene Ammons

- The Happy Blues (Prestige, 1956)
- The Boss Is Back! (Prestige, 1969)
- Brother Jug! (Prestige, 1969)

With Tony Bennett

- The Beat of My Heart (Columbia, 1957)
- In Person! (Columbia, 1959)
- I Wanna Be Around... (Columbia, 1963)

With Art Blakey

- Drum Suite (Columbia, 1957)

With Ray Bryant

- Ray Bryant Trio (Epic, 1956)

With Kenny Burrell

- Introducing Kenny Burrell (Blue Note, 1956)

With Duke Ellington

- A Drum Is a Woman (Columbia, 1956)

With Don Elliott

- Jamaica Jazz (ABC-Paramount, 1958)

With Erroll Garner

- Mambo Moves Garner (Mercury, 1954)

With Bennie Green

- Bennie Green Blows His Horn (Prestige, 1955)

With Grant Green

- His Majesty King Funk (Verve, 1965)

With Dizzy Gillespie

- Afro (Norgran, 1954)
- Gillespiana (Verve, 1960)
- The Melody Lingers On (Limelight, 1966)

With Coleman Hawkins

- The Hawk Talks (Decca, 1955)

With Bobby Hutcherson

- Now! (Blue Note, 1969)

With Illinois Jacquet

- Spectrum (Argo, 1965)

With Jazz at the Philharmonic

- Jazz at the Philharmonic in Europe (Verve, 1963)

With Elvin Jones

- Poly-Currents (Blue Note, 1969)
- Coalition (Blue Note, 1970)
- New Agenda (Vanguard, 1975)

With Wynton Kelly

- It's All Right! (Verve, 1964)

With Stan Kenton

- Kenton Showcase (Capitol, 1954)

With Benjamin Lapidus

- Ochosi Blues - Latin, Soul, Organ Jazz - Benjamin Lapidus & Kari B3 (2014)

With The Lecuona Cuban Boys

- Dance Along with the Lecuona Cuban Boys (ABC-Paramount, 1959)

With Machito

- Kenya (Roulette, 1958)

With Gary McFarland

- The In Sound (Verve, 1965)

With Ellen McIlwaine

- Honky Tonk Angel (Polydor, 1972)
- We the People (Polydor, 1973)

With Wes Montgomery

- Bumpin' (1965)

With Tito Puente

- Cuban Carnival (RCA, 1956)

With Lightnin' Rod

- Hustlers Convention (Celluloid, 1973)

With Sonny Rollins

- What's New? (RCA Victor, 1962)

With Bobby Sanabria

- Afro-Cuban Dream: Live & in Clave!!! Bobby Sanabria Big Band (Arabesque, 2000)
- 50 Years of Mambo - A Tribute to Damaso Perez Prado - The Mambo All Stars Orchestra (Mambo Maniacs, 2003)
- Kenya Revisited Live!!! Manhattan School of Music Afro-Cuban Jazz Orchestra conducted by Bobby Sanabria (Jazzheads, 2008)

With Billy Taylor

- The Billy Taylor Trio with Candido (Prestige, 1955)

With Tico All-Stars

- Descargas at the Village Gate (Tico, 1966)

With Randy Weston

- Uhuru Afrika (Roulette, 1960)
- Tanjah (Polydor, 1973)

== Sources ==
- Leymarie, Isabelle (2002). Cuban Fire: The Saga of Salsa and Latin Jazz. Continuum International Publishing Group. ISBN 9780826465665. OCLC 1029017277.
