= Afro-Cuban (disambiguation) =

Afro-Cubans are Cubans who are of Black African ancestry. The term may also refer to:

== In music ==
- Music of African heritage in Cuba
- Afro-Cuban jazz, the earliest form of Latin jazz
- Afro-Cuban (album), a 1955 album by Kenny Dorham
- Afro-Cubans (band), a Latin jazz band founded by Machito in 1940
- Afro-Cuban All Stars, a Cuban band formed in 1996

== See also ==
- Cabildo (Cuba)
- Emancipados
- Haitian Cuban
