= Cuban Pete (song) =

Cuban rumba song

"Cuban Pete" is a song with music and lyrics by José Norman. It was recorded by Harry Roy and His Mayfair Hotel Orchestra on June 9, 1936 and later covered by other artists.

Its other covers include Louis Armstrong (1937), Desi Arnaz in the musical Cuban Pete (1946) and in the TV show I Love Lucy, and Jim Carrey in The Mask.

The nickname "Cuban Pete" of the mambo dancer Pedro Aguilar came from the movie and later Desi Arnaz endorsed it.

Billboard: Cuban Pete (Jim Carrey's single):

- Dance Music/Club Play Singles - Peak no. 42
- Hot Dance Music/Maxi-Singles Sales - Peak no. 21
