= South of the Border (Charlie Parker album) =

Studio album by Charlie Parker
- Released: 1952 (LP); 1995 (CD)
- Genre: Latin jazz
- Length: 57:54
- Label: Mercury, Verve

Charlie Parker chronology
Bird and Diz (1952)	South of the Border (1952)	Jazz at Massey Hall (1953)

South of the Border is a studio album by jazz saxophonist Charlie Parker, first released in 1952 for Mercury Records as a 10" LP. An expanded release was made on CD by Verve Records in 1995, and all tracks were included on Verve's box set Bird: The Complete Charlie Parker on Verve.

== Critical reception ==
The Penguin Guide to Jazz noted, "Time, surely, to put paid to snobbery about these lovely records," and rated the original album 3 of 4 stars and the Definitive Records re-release 2.5 of 4 stars. Richard Ginell of Allmusic commented, "Bird's improvisational style changed hardly at all in a Latin setting. He continued to run off his patented lightning bop licks over the congas and bongos and they just happened to interlock with the grooves quite snugly, although he did adapt his phrasing of the tunes themselves to suit their rhythmic lines."

Professional ratings
Review scores
Source	Rating
Allmusic	(vinyl) (CD)
The Penguin Guide to Jazz	(vinyl) (CD)

== Track listing ==
1. "Mango Mangue" (Marion Sunshine, Gilberto Valdes) – 2:54
2. "Okiedoke" (René Hernández, Machito) – 3:02
3. "No Noise" (John Bartee) – 5:52
4. "My Little Suede Shoes" (Parker) – 3:04
5. "Un Poquito de Tu Amor" (Xavier Cugat, Arthur Freed) – 2:41
6. "Why Do I Love You?" (Oscar Hammerstein II, Jerome Kern) – 3:06
7. "Tico-Tico" (Jose Abreu, Zequinha de Abreu, Ervin Drake, Aloysio Oliveira) – 2:44
8. "Fiesta" (Fernando Brown, Joan Manuel Serrat, traditional) – 2:49
9. "La Cucaracha" (traditional) – 2:43
10. "Mama Inez" (Louis Wolfe Gilbert, Eliseo Grenet) – 2:50
11. "Estrellita" (Vito Picone, Arthur Venosa) – 2:43
12. "La Paloma" (traditional) – 2:39
13. "Begin the Beguine" (Cole Porter) – 3:12
14. "Afro-Cuban Jazz Suite" (Arturo O'Farrill, Chico O'Farrill) – 17:14

== Personnel ==
- Charlie Parker – alto saxophone
- Mario Bauzá, Paquito Davilla, Harry "Sweets" Edison, Benny Harris, Al Stewart, Bobby Woodlen – trumpet
- Gene Johnson, Fred Skerritt – alto saxophone
- Jose Madera, Flip Phillips, Sol Rabinowitz – tenor saxophone
- Leslie Johnakins – baritone saxophone
- Walter Bishop Jr., René Hernández – piano
- Teddy Kotick, Roberto Rodriguez – bass
- Roy Haynes, Buddy Rich, Max Roach – drums
- Machito, Jose Mangual Sr., Luis Miranda, Ubaldo Nieto, Chano Pozo – percussion
