= Michael Terrace =

American dancer (1925–2018)

Michael Santiago Gutierrez (December 30, 1925 – March 16, 2018), better known as Michael Terrace, was an American ballroom and Broadway stage dancer, choreographer, actor, dance consultant, and writer. His stage and subsequent dance career spanned a total of 60 years, during which he made innumerable contributions to ballroom dancing. Terrace played Bernardo in West Side Story with the national company and was picked out of 2,500 ballet dancers to be at the Metropolitan Opera House to perform with the Bolshoi Ballet Company of Russia.

== Life and career ==
Early Years Miguel Santiago Gutierrez de Lozano was born in Spanish Harlem, New York City, on December 30, 1925. Young Michael, of Cuban and Venezuelan descent, was the great grandson of prolific Venezuelan poet, Abigail Lozano. He joined the Marines during WWII and was honorably discharged. When he returned from the war, Michael used the GI Bill to fund his education in dance.

Dance Years Terrace started his dance career at the Dale Murray dance studio and eventually lived and trained in Carnegie Hall. He also was a regular performer in renowned NYC dance clubs like The Palladium Ballroom, Roseland, China Doll and Park Plaza. Terrace met and married Elita Cleveland and formed the dance team Terrace & Elita. Some of the original "Mambo-niks", Michael and Elita, were regulars in the Palladium Ballroom dance competitions and helped to bring the Mambo craze to mainstream America. They worked closely and often with legends such as Tito Puente, Machito, Sammy Davis Jr., Harry Belafonte and many other stars of the 1950s and 1960s.

Terrace was particularly associated with the film Dirty Dancing (1987). His stories of the formative years of the Mambo in the Catskills, where Michael was a teacher, inspired Eleanor Bergstein's vision of lead character Johnny Castle (played by Patrick Swayze).

Later Years In his later years, he opened a dance studio in Englewood, New Jersey, was featured in the Bravo documentary "The Palladium: Where Mambo was King", appeared in bit parts in feature films, and wrote many stories about the Palladium.

Career at the Housing Authority of Englewood, NJ Michael Terrace also served as the Executive Director of the Housing Authority of Englewood, NJ from 1976 to 1983. Under his leadership, the Housing Authority made significant strides in providing housing assistance to low-income residents. His tenure marked a period of growth and development of the Housing Authority, contributing to its mission of providing affordable housing options of the community.

Terrace was an ardent supporter of dancing, and especially dancing the "Mambo on Two" for his entire life. He was dedicated to preserving the stories of the Mambo and The Palladium Ballroom.

Michael Terrace later lived in Boynton Beach, Florida, and continued to dance with friends at the Goldcoast until he died on March 16, 2018, at the age of 92.
