= Mombo =

Mombo may refer to:

- Mombo, Cameroon, a town located in the Littoral Region
- Mombo, Tanzania, a place located in the Tanga Region
- Mombo Dogon, a language spoken in Mali

== See also ==
- Mambo (disambiguation)
- Mumbo (disambiguation)
