= Mambo =

Mambo most often refers to:

- Mambo (music), a Cuban musical form
- Mambo (dance), a dance corresponding to mambo music

Mambo may also refer to:

== Music ==
- Mambo section, a section in arrangements of some types of Afro-Caribbean music, particularly danzón; the musical form of the same name developed from this section

=== Albums ===
- Mambo! (album), a 1954 album by Yma Sumac
- Mambo (album), a 1991 album by Spanish music duo Azúcar Moreno
- Mambo, album by Jeff Maluleke
- Mambo, album by Remmy Ongala

=== Songs ===
- "Mambo" (1938 song) by Orestes Lopez
- "Mambo" (Henry Santos song), 2021
- "Mambo!" (Helena Paparizou song), 2005
- "Mambo" by Leonard Bernstein from West Side Story
- "Mambo", a 2021 song by Steve Aoki and Willy William
- "Mambo No. 5", a jazz composition

== Film and television ==
- Chuck Mambo, English professional wrestler
- Mambo (film), a 1954 Italian American film
- Mambo V, a character in Ninjago
- Mambo Duckman, a character from the television series Duckman
- Moshe Mambo, a character from the movie Money Monster
- Millennium Mambo, a 2001 Taiwanese film
- Mambo, a popular nickname of Matikanetannhauser from Umamusume: Pretty Derby

== Other uses ==
- Mambo (Vodou), a Haitian Vodou priestess
- Mambo (software), an open source content management system
- Mambo (title), a Bantu title equivalent to "king"
- MAMbo, the Bologna Museum of Modern Art in Bologna, Italy
- MAMBO, the Bogotá Museum of Modern Art in Bogotá, Colombia
- Mambo Graphics, the company behind the Australian surf clothing brand Mambo

== See also ==
- Mumbo (disambiguation)
