= Mario Bauzá =

Cuban-American jazz musician and composer (1911–1993)

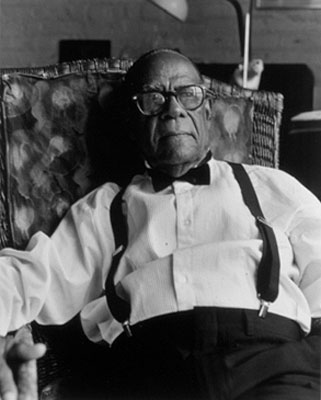
- Mario Bauzá, taken in Brooklyn, New York, 1992

Background information
- Born: Prudencio Mario Bauzá Cárdenas; April 28, 1911; Havana, Cuba
- Died: July 11, 1993 (aged 82) New York, United States
- Genres: Big band, creator of the Afro-Cuban jazz
- Occupations: Musician, arranger, composer
- Instruments: Clarinet, saxophone, trumpet
- Years active: 1925–1993
- Labels: Mercury, Messidor

Prudencio Mario Bauzá Cárdenas (April 28, 1911 – July 11, 1993) was an Afro-Cuban jazz bandleader, and jazz musician. He was among the first to introduce Cuban music to the United States by bringing Cuban musical styles to the New York City jazz scene. While Cuban bands had had popular jazz tunes in their repertoire for years, Bauzá's composition "Tangá" was the first piece to blend jazz harmony, arranging technique, and soloist style with Afro-Cuban rhythms. It is considered the first true Afro-Cuban jazz tune.

== Biography ==
As a child he studied clarinet, becoming recognized as a child prodigy on the instrument, and was featured with the Havana Symphony at age 11. Bauzá then performed on clarinet and bass clarinet with pianist Antonio María Romeu's charanga (a Cuban ensemble composed of flutes, violins, piano, a double bass, and Latin percussion). This proved a fateful event as the orchestra visited New York City to record in 1926. Bauzá's stayed with his cousin, trumpeter René Endreira, who was a Harlem resident and played with The Santo Domingo Serenaders, a band was made up of Panamanians, Cubans, and Puerto Ricans playing jazz. Teenage Bauzá was impressed by Harlem's African American community and the freedom they had. He also witnessed a performance of George Gershwin's "Rhapsody in Blue" and was inspired by saxophonist Frankie Trumbauer's feature in the piece. Upon his return to Cuba, he vowed he would return to New York City to become a jazz musician. He did so in 1930, learning to play the alto saxophone while maintaining his clarinet technique. A chance encounter with Cuban vocalist vocalist Antonio Machin, who needed a trumpet player for an upcoming record date he was leading, gave Bauzá an unusual opportunity. Machin was the vocalist for the Don Azpiazú Havana Casino Orchestra who had taken New York City by storm with their public performances and recent hit recording of "El Manisero" ("The Peanut Vendor"). Machin was offered a record date to record four tunes. When Machin performed solo, he did so with two guitars, a trumpet, and himself on maracas. All the trumpet players that knew how to play in the Cuban style who were part of Azpiazú's orchestra had left to return to Cuba. Faced with a dilemma Bauzá offered his services to Machin because he knew the finger positions on the horn buying a trumpet and in two weeks developed enough technique to play on the recordings. He now devoted his time to playing the instrument being inspired by Louis Armstrong. By 1933, Bauzá had been hired as lead trumpeter and musical director for drummer Chick Webb's Orchestra, and it was during this time with Webb that Bauzá both met fellow trumpeter Dizzy Gillespie, and allegedly discovered and brought into the band singer Ella Fitzgerald.

In 1938, Bauzá joined Cab Calloway's band, later convincing Calloway to hire trumpeter Dizzy Gillespie. He left the ensemble in 1940.

In 1939, Bauzá became co-founder and musical director of Machito and his Afro-Cubans with his vocalist brother-in-law, Francisco Raúl Gutierrez Grillo (known as Machito). The band produced its first recordings for Decca in 1941, and in 1942 Bauzá brought in a timbalero named Tito Puente.

Importantly in 1947, Bauzá introduced the young Havana conga virtuoso Chano Pozo to Gillespie, when the latter wanted to add a Cuban percussionist to his band; though Pozo was killed in a Harlem bar fight just a year later, he left an indelible and long-lasting mark on Gillespie's playing and compositions; co-writing several other compositions such as "Manteca" and "Tin Tin Deo".

In 1943, the success of "Tanga," the first truly Afro-Cuban jazz tune (attributed to Bauzá), were followed by "Cubop City" and "Mambo Inn". Machito and his Afro-Cubans often played straight-ahead big band jazz as well as mambo music. Many of the numbers were covers of recordings which had proved popular in Cuba, but with updated arrangements using jazz harmony. The band played mambo-style dance numbers at venues such as Manhattan's Palladium Ballroom. Bauzá kept his post as director of the Afro-Cubans until 1976. After this he worked sparingly, eventually retiring to almost total obscurity. In 1979, New York City's Caribbean Cultural Center gave a tribute to Bauzá in an outdoor concert at Lincoln Center featuring Bauzá and his big band. The concert featured pianist Billy Taylor, singers Bobby Capó and Graciela, Machito, Jorge Dalto, Chocolate Armenteros and Mario Rivera and was a follow-up to CCCADI's 1979 tribute at Alice Tully Hall which revived Bauza's career. A 1990 Celebration of his 80th birthday with his big band with special guests Dizzy Gillespie, Chico O'Farrill, Celia Cruz, José Fajardo, Marco Rizo, at Symphony Space in Manhattan, gave Bauzá the opportunity to record again for the German-based Messidor label. The subsequent recordings, Tanga - The Original Mambo King, 944 Columbus Avenue, and My Time Is Now, brought Bauzá two Grammy nominations and out of the shadows into the public's eye with critical acclaim. Subsequent European tours on the jazz festival circuit followed culminating with him gracing the cover of DownBeat magazine and a 1992 guest appearance with his big band on The Cosby Show (S08 E22: "You Can't Stop the Music"), performing with Willie Colón.

1991 he met at his 80th birthday bash at the Beacon Theatre in New York City/Harlem the german producer Götz A. Wörner. He realized 2 Tours in Europe and three productions with him and his orchestra. One was featuring on a title Arturo Sandoval and Paquito d'Rivera. Quincy Jones directed at a show in 1992 at the Montreux Jazz Festival 1992 the orchestra. His record "My time is now" (messidor) was nominated for a grammy in the category latin jazz.

== "Tangá" and the creation of Afro-Cuban jazz ==
The band had a major hit with "Tangá," initially a descarga (Cuban Jam) in mambo tempo with jazz soloists, spontaneously composed by Bauzá. "Tangá", which was over time arranged with a more formal arrangement. It is generally considered to be the first true Afro-Cuban jazz tune.

The first descarga [Cuban jam session] that made the world take notice is traced to a Machito rehearsal on May 29, 1943, at the Park Palace Ballroom, at 110th Street and 5th Avenue. At this time, Machito was at Fort Dix (New Jersey) in his fourth week of basic training. The day before at La Conga Club, Mario Bauzá, Machito's trumpeter and music director, heard pianist Luis Varona and bassist Julio Andino play something which would serve as a permanent sign off (end the dance) tune.

On this Monday evening, Bauzá leaned over the piano and instructed Varona to play the same piano vamp he did the night before. Varona's left hand began the introduction of Gilberto Valdes' "El Botellero." Bauza then instructed Julio Andino what to play; then the saxes; then the trumpets. The interlocking riffs soon began to take shape into an Afro-Cuban jazzed up melody. Gene Johnson's alto sax then emitted oriental-like jazz phrases. By accident, Afro-Cuban jazz was invented when Bauzá composed "Tanga" (the Bantú Congolese word for energy) that evening.

Thereafter, whenever "Tangá" was played, it sounded different, depending on a soloist's individuality. In August, 1948, when trumpeter Howard McGhee soloed with Machito's orchestra at the Apollo Theatre, his ad-libs to "Tangá" resulted in "Cu-Bop City," a tune which was recorded by Roost Records months later. The jams which took place at the Royal Roost, Bop City and Birdland between 1948 and 1949, when Howard McGhee, tenor saxophonist Brew Moore, Charlie Parker and Dizzy Gillespie sat in with the Machito orchestra, were unrehearsed, uninhibited, unheard of before jam sessions which at the time, master of ceremonies Symphony Sid called Afro-Cuban jazz.

The Machito orchestra's ten to fifteen-minute jams were the first in Latin music to break away from the traditional under-four-minute recordings and live performances. In February, 1949, the Machito orchestra became the first to set a precedent in Latin music when it featured tenor saxophonist Flip Phillips in a five-minute recording of "Tangá." The twelve-inch 78 RPM, part of The Jazz Scene album, sold for $25—Salazar (1997).

The right hand of the "Tangá" piano guajeo is in the style known as "ponchando," a type of non-arpeggiated guajeo using block chords. The sequence of attack-points is emphasized, rather than a sequence of different pitches. As a form of accompaniment it can be played in a strictly repetitive fashion or as a varied motif akin to jazz comping. The following example is in the style of a 1949 recording by Machito. 2‐3 clave, piano by René Hernández.

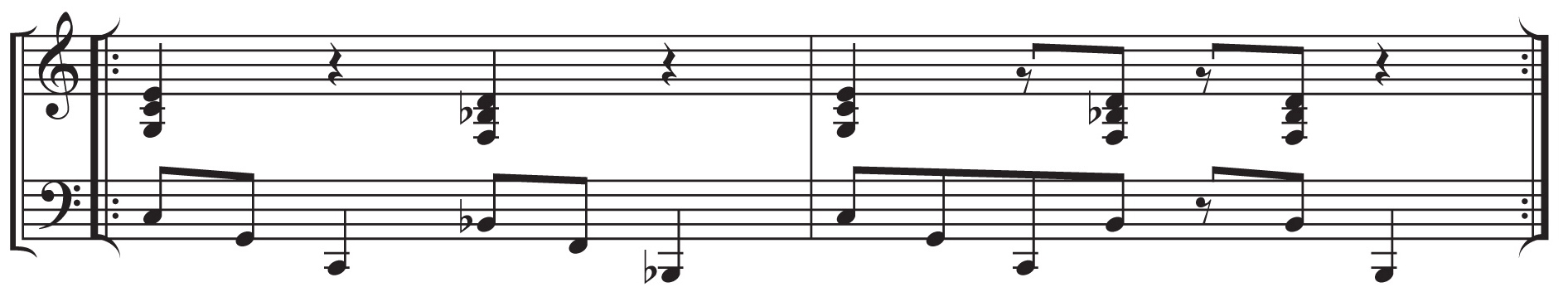
"Tanga" in the style of Machito and His Afro‐Cubans (recorded 1949). 2‐3 clave, piano: René Hernández.

With "Tangá," Bauzá was the first to explore modal harmony (a concept explored later by Miles Davis and Gil Evans) from a jazz arranging perspective. Of note is the sheet of sound effect in the arrangement through the use of multiple layering. Under Bauzá's direction, Machito and his Afro-Cubans were first band to successfully wed jazz big band arranging techniques within an original composition with jazz oriented soloists utilizing an authentic Afro-Cuban-based rhythm section in a successful manner. e.g. Gene Johnson – alto, Brew Moore – tenor, composition in "Tanga" (1943).

== Master of arranging in-clave ==
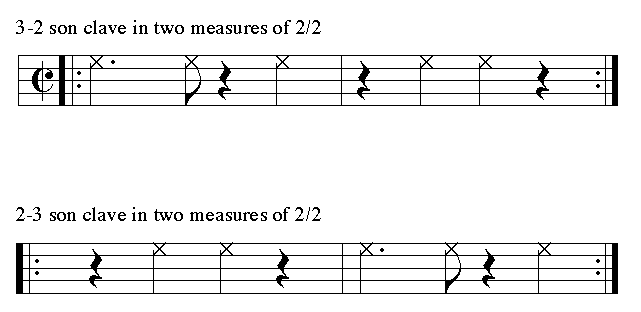
3-2 clave and 2-3 clave written in cut-time

The 3-2/2-3 clave concept and terminology was developed in New York City during the 1940s by Bauza while he was the music director of Machito and his Afro-Cubans. Bauzá was a master at moving the song from one side of clave to the other seamlessly without breaking the claves rhythmic design. Legendary Nuyorican bassist Andy Gonzalez coined the phrase "Clave Counterpoint" to describe the technique. The following melodic excerpt is taken from the opening verses of “Que vengan los rumberos” by Machito and his Afro-Cubans. Notice how the melody goes from one side of clave to the other and then back again. A measure of 2/4 moves the chord progression from the two-side (2–3), to the three-side (3–2). Later, another measure of 2/4 moves the start of the chord progression back to two-side (2–3).

The first 4 1/2 claves of the verses are in 2–3. Following the measure of 2/4 (half clave) the song flips to the three-side. It continues in 3-2 on the V7 chord for 4 1/2 claves. The second measure of 2/4 flips the song back to the two-side and the I chord.

In songs like “Que vengan los rumberos,” the phrases continually alternate between a 3–2 framework and a 2–3 framework. It takes a certain amount of flexibility to repeatedly reorder your orientation in this way. The most challenging moments are the truncations and other transitional phrases where you “pivot” in order to move your point of reference from one side of clave to the other.

Working in conjunction with the chord and clave changes, vocalist Frank “Machito” Grillo creates an arc of tension/release spanning more than a dozen measures. Initially Machito sings the melody straight (first line), but soon expresses the lyrics in the freer and more syncopated inspiración of a folkloric rumba (second line). By the time the song changes to 3–2 on the V7 chord, Machito has developed a considerable amount of rhythmic tension by contradicting the underlying meter. That tension is then resolved when he sings on three consecutive main beats (quarter-notes), followed by tresillo. In the measure immediately following tresillo the song returns to 2–3 and the I chord (fifth line)—Peñalosa (2010).

Bobby Sanabria, who was Bauzá's drummer during his later years, points out that Bauzá was the first to explore jazz arranging techniques with authentic Afro-Cuban rhythms on a consistent basis, giving it a unique identifiable sound that no other band in the genre of Afro-Cuban-based dance music had at the time. Cuban big band arranger Chico O'Farill stated: "This was a new concept in interpreting Cuban music with as much (harmonic) richness as possible. You have to understand how important this was. It made every other band that came after, followers."

== Discography ==
Mario Bauza and His Afro Cuban Jazz Orchestra Mario Bauza and His Afro Cuban Jazz Orchestra, Tanga (messidor, 1991) Mario Bauza and His Afro Cuban Jazz Orchestra, My time is now (messidor, 1992) Mario Bauza and His Afro Cuban Jazz Orchestra, 944 Columbus (messidor, 1993)

Mario

With Dizzy Gillespie and Machito

- Afro-Cuban Jazz Moods (Pablo, 1975)

Contributing artist

- The Rough Guide to Salsa (World Music Network, 1997)
- The Rough Guide to the Music of Cuba (World Music Network, 1998)

== Sources ==
- Boggs, Vernon. Salsiology: Afro-Cuban Music and the evolution of Salsa in New York City. ISBN 0-313-28468-7.
- Gerard, Charley and Marty Sheller. Salsa! The Rhythm of Latin Music. ISBN 0-941677-11-7, ISBN 0-941677-09-5.
- Moore, Kevin (2009). Beyond Salsa Piano; The Cuban Timba Piano Revolution v.2 Early Cuban Piano Tumbao (1940–1959). Santa Cruz, CA: Moore Music. ISBN 144998018X
- Morales, Ed. The Latin Beat: The Rhythms and Roots of Latin Music from Bossa Nova to Salsa and beyond. ISBN 0-306-81018-2
- Peñalosa, David (2009). The Clave matrix; Afro-Cuban Rhythm: its principles and African origins. Redway, CA: Bembe Inc. ISBN 1-886502-80-3.
- Roberts, John S. The Latin Tinge. ISBN 0-19-502564-4.
- Roberts, John S. Latin Jazz: the first of fusions, 1880s to Today. ISBN 0-02-864681-9.
