= Mambo Jambo =

"Mambo Jambo" is the alternative name of the song "Qué rico el mambo" by Perez Prado.

Mambo Jambo may also refer to:

- "Mambo Jambo", a song on Scatman John's album Scatman's World
- Mambo Jambo, a theme clubbing night of Zouk club, in Singapore and Kuala Lumpur

== See also ==
- Mumbo Jumbo (disambiguation)
