= Millie Donay =

American dancer (1934–2007)

- Born: Carmela Dante Di Stefano; February 23, 1934
- Died: July 16, 2007 (aged 73)
- Occupation: Latin dancer
- Known for: Pioneering Mambo

Millie Donay (born Carmela Dante Di Stefano; February 23, 1934 – July 16, 2007) was an American professional Latin dancer, a pioneer of Mambo dance.

Her first partner (1950–1956) was Pedro "Cuban Pete" Aguilar of the Palladium Ballroom. Among many other places, they performed at Carnegie Hall, the Apollo Theater, Waldorf Astoria, and in Madison Square Garden for Israeli President David Ben-Gurion. They trained the teachers of the Arthur Murray Dance Studios in Latin dances.

During 1957–1960, she and Marilyn Winters formed a Latin dance team.

== Filmography ==
- Mambo Madness, featured with Cuban Pete.
- Mambo Kings, featured and co-choreographed with Cuban Pete.
