= Bird and Diz =

Studio album by Charlie Parker and Dizzy Gillespie
- Released: July/August 1952
- Recorded: February–May 5, 1949; and June 6, 1950; in New York City
- Genre: Bebop
- Length: 24:58
- Label: Clef/Verve
- Producer: Norman Granz

Charlie Parker and Dizzy Gillespie chronology
Diz 'N' Bird In Concert (1947)	Bird and Diz (1952)	Jazz at Massey Hall (1953)

Charlie Parker chronology
Bird and Diz (1952)	South of the Border (1952)

Alternate cover
- 1986 Verve vinyl reissue

Professional ratings
Review scores
Source	Rating
AllMusic	4.5/5 stars
DownBeat	4/5 stars
The Encyclopedia of Popular Music	4/5 stars
The Penguin Guide to Jazz	3/4 stars
The Rolling Stone Album Guide	4/5 stars

Bird and Diz is a studio album by jazz saxophonist Charlie Parker and trumpeter Dizzy Gillespie. It was recorded primarily on June 6, 1950, in New York City. Two tracks featured on the original pressing, "Passport" and "Visa", were recorded by Parker, without Gillespie and with different personnel than the other tracks, in March and May 1949. The album was originally issued in 1952 in 10" format as a collection of 78 rpm singles on the Verve subsidiary label Clef Records.

Although produced by Norman Granz, known for large ensembles at the time, the album contains compositions performed with the standard bebop instrumentation of saxophone, trumpet, piano, bass, and drums. In a 1952 four-star review of Bird and Diz, a DownBeat magazine columnist wrote of Granz's contribution to the album's sound, stating "Though there is no mention of bop in Norman Granz'[s] notes, we owe him a salvo for reminding us through this LP that this music is still very much alive." It is the final collaborative studio recording by Parker and Gillespie, and has been reissued several times by Verve and PolyGram Records.

== Track listing ==
Included on the original LP, "Passport" and "Visa" were omitted from the reissue because they were not recorded during the 1950 Bird and Diz session.

=== Side one ===
Track	Recorded	Song Number	Song title	Writer(s)	Time
1.	6/6/50	C 410-4	Bloomdido	Charlie Parker	3:25
2.	6/6/50	C 413-2	My Melancholy Baby	Ernie M. Burnett and George A. Norton	3:24
3.	6/6/50	C 415-4	Relaxin' with Lee	Charlie Parker	2:47
4.	5/5/49	C 295-2	Passport	Charlie Parker	3:00

=== Side two ===
Track	Recorded	Song Number	Song title	Writer	Time
1.	6/6/50	C 414–11	Leap Frog	Benny Harris and Charlie Parker	2:29
2.	6/6/50	C 411-4	An Oscar for Treadwell	Charlie Parker	3:23
3.	6/6/50	C 412-6	Mohawk	Charlie Parker	3:35
4.	2/3/49	C 293-4	Visa	Charlie Parker	2:55

=== CD reissue ===
The Verve/PolyGram remaster editions feature 18 additional takes and liner notes by music scholar James Patrick and producer Norman Granz.

1. "Bloomdido" – 3:25
2. "My Melancholy Baby" – 3:24
3. "Relaxin' with Lee" – 2:47
4. "Leap Frog" – 2:29
5. "An Oscar for Treadwell" – 3:23
6. "Mohawk" – 3:36
7. "My Melancholy Baby (Complete Take)" – 3:17
8. "Relaxin' With Lee (Take 4 Complete Take)" – 3:56
9. "Leap Frog (Take 11 Complete Take)" – 2:34
10. "Leap Frog (Take 8 Complete Take)" – 2:02
11. "Leap Frog (Take 9 Complete Take)" – 2:06
12. "An Oscar for Treadwell (Take 4 Complete Take)" – 3:21
13. "Mohawk (Take 3 Complete Take)" – 3:48
14. "Relaxin' With Lee (Take 1 Breakdown Take)" – 0:17
15. "Relaxin' With Lee (Take 2 Breakdown Take)" – 1:08
16. "Relaxin' With Lee (Take 3 False Start)" – 0:04
17. "Relaxin' With Lee (Take 5 Breakdown Take)" – 0:24
18. "Leap Frog (Take 1 Breakdown Take)" – 0:26
19. "Leap Frog (Take 7 Breakdown Take)" – 0:14
20. "Leap Frog (Take 10 Breakdown Take)" – 0:40
21. "Leap Frog (Take 2 Breakdown Take)" – 0:18
22. "Leap Frog (Take 6 Breakdown Take)" – 0:20
23. "Leap Frog (Take 4 Breakdown Take)" – 0:13
24. "Leap Frog (Take 3 Breakdown Take)" – 0:41

== Personnel ==
=== Musicians ===
- Charlie Parker - saxophone (Complete Album)
- Dizzy Gillespie - trumpet (except tracks A4 & B4)
- Curley Russell - bass (except on tracks A4 & B4)
- Buddy Rich - drums (except tracks A4 & B4)
- Thelonious Monk - piano (except tracks A4 & B4)
- Tommy Potter - bass (on tracks A4 & B4)
- Carlos Vidal - bongo (on track B4)
- Max Roach - drums (tracks A4 & B4)
- Al Haig - piano (tracks A4 & B4)
- Tommy Turk - trombone (track B4)
- Kenny Dorham - trumpet (tracks A4 & B4)

=== Production ===
- Norman Granz - producer
- Dennis Drake - mastering
- David Stone Martin - cover design
