= Barbara Craddock =

American dancer (1950-2015)

- Born: Barbara Miller; May 18, 1940; New York
- Died: January 20, 2015 (aged 74); Pembroke Pines, Florida
- Education: New York School of Interior Design
- Occupations: Dancer, choreographer, competition judge

Barbara Craddock (May 18, 1940 – January 20, 2015) was an American professional dancer and choreographer specializing in Latin dance and an internationally accredited dance competition judge. She was the dance partner and manager of Pedro "Cuban Pete" Aguilar for 11 years until his death in 2009.

== Biography ==
Craddock was born Barbara Miller in New York on May 18, 1940. She began dancing at the age of five and became a professional ballroom dancer at the age of 15. She later went on to earn a degree in interior design from the New York School of Interior Design. In the 1960s-70s, she performed in New York and New Jersey with Kiko Fernandez. In the 1980s, she went on to South Florida, where she performed a two-woman revue, Invitation to the Dance with Marilyn DeLee and Olga Suarez. She also taught workshops and lectured on the history of Latin dance as well as judged dance competitions.

Craddock had met Aguilar multiple times at international dance events since the 1950s, though they did not officially become a team until 1998.

Craddock and Cuban Pete were inducted in the International Latin Music Hall of Fame and were the first Latin dancers to be awarded the Latin Jazz USA Lifetime Achievement Awards at the 2007-2008 Ms. Latina International Pageant. In 2003 they were also given lifetime achievement awards from the Norwegian government and Norwegian Dance Association for their contributions to Latin dance.

Barbara Craddock died on January 20, 2015, in Pembroke Pines, Florida. She is buried in Beth David Cemetery in Elmont, New York.
