= Mambo section =

Section of an arrangement in Danzón and related styles

In Afro-Caribbean music, mambo is the section of an arrangement in Danzón and related styles, which features instrumental improvisation.

== History ==
The beginning of the evolution of this section from montuno is attributed to Machito and his Afro-Cubans, who included material, new to Afro-Caribbean music, for brass and saxophones, borrowed from the big band style.

Israel "Cachao" López added an open vamp to Danzón and called it "nuevo ritmo" ("new rhythm"), which was later called "Mambo section." and eventually evolved into Mambo music.

== See also ==
- Danzón topics
- Mambo topics
- Afro-Caribbean music
