= Omar Sosa =

Cuban jazz pianist (born 1965)

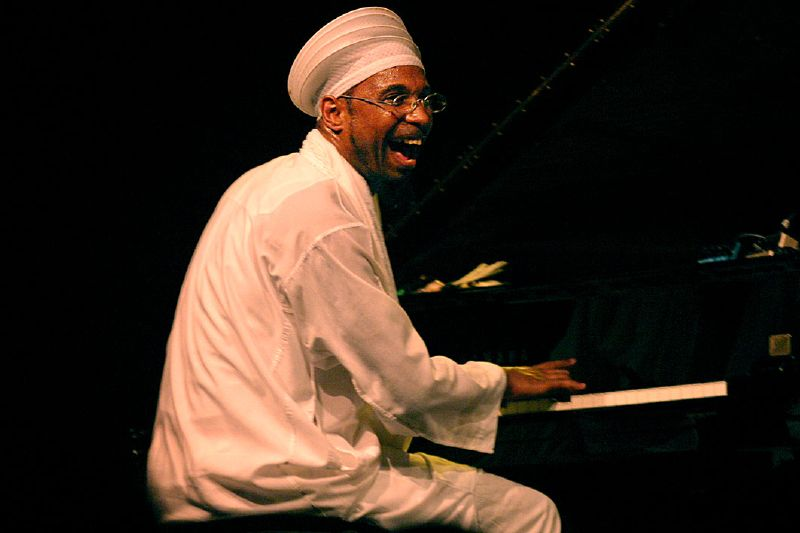
- Omar Sosa in concert

Background information
- Born: April 10, 1965 (age 61); Camagüey, Cuba
- Genres: Afro-Cuban jazz, Latin jazz
- Occupation: Musician
- Instruments: Piano, Rhodes piano, marimba
- Years active: 1995–present
- Website: omarsosa.com

Omar Sosa (born April 10, 1965) is a jazz pianist from Cuba.

== Biography ==
A native of Camagüey, Cuba, Sosa studied percussion at the Escuela Nacional de Musica and Instituto Superior de Arte. In the 1980s he started the band Tributo, recording albums and touring with the band. He worked with Cuban vocalist Xiomara Laugart and several Latin jazz bands. In the 1990s he moved from Cuba to Quito, Ecuador; to Palma de Mallorca, Spain; to the San Francisco Bay area, in California, United States; and finally settled in Barcelona, Spain.

While in California, Sosa released his first few albums under his own name. He had received Grammy Award nominations for four of his albums, three in the Latin Jazz category, as of 2020. In January 2011, Sosa and the NDR Bigband[de] (North German Radio Bigband) won the 10th Independent Music Awards (IMAs) in the Jazz Album category for Ceremony. He has also collaborated with Paolo Fresu, Seckou Keita, Adam Rudolph, and many other musicians.

Sosa has released most of his recordings on his own Otá label.

== Discography ==
- Solo Piano, originally released as Omar Omar (Otá, 1996)
- Nfumbe: For the Unseen, with John Santos (Otá/PriceClub, 1997)
- Free Roots (Otá, 1997)
- Inside (Otá, 1998)
- Spirit of the Roots (Otá, 1999)
- Bembon (Otá, 2000)
- Prietos (Otá, 2000)
- Sentir (Otá, 2002)
- Ayaguna, with Gustavo Ovalles (Otá, 2003)
- A New Life (Otá, 2003)
- Pictures of Soul, with Adam Rudolph (Otá/Meta Records, 2004)
- Aleatoric Efx (Otá, 2004)
- Mulatos (Otá, 2004)
- Mulatos Remix (Otá, 2005)
- Live à FIP (Otá, 2006)
- Promise, with Paolo Fresu (Otá/Skip[de], 2007)
- D.O.: A Day Off, with Greg Landau (Otá, 2007)
- Afreecanos (Otá, 2008)
- Tales from the Earth A Tale of Rhythm and Ancestry, with Mark Weinstein (Otá, 2009)
- Across the Divide (Half Note Records, 2009)
- Simb, with Adam Rudolph (Otá/Meta Records, 2009)
- Ceremony, with NDR Bigband (Otá, 2010)
- Calma (Otá, 2011)
- Alma, with Paolo Fresu (Otá, 2012)
- Eggun: The Afri-Lectric Experience (Otá, 2013)
- Senses (Otá, 2014)
- ile (Otá, 2015)
- Jog, with de:Joo Kraus and Gustavo Ovalles (Otá, 2016)
- Eros, with Paolo Fresu (2016)
- Es:Sensual, with NDR Big Band (Skip/Otá, 2017/2018)
- Transparent Water, with Seckou Keita (Otá, 2017)
- Aguas, with Yilian Cañizares (Otá, 2018)
- An East African Journey (Otá, 2021)
- SUBA, with Sekou Keita (Otá, 2021)
- Iroko, with Igana Santana (Selo Sesc, 2023)
- Food, with Paolo Fresu (Tuk Music, 2023)
