= Afro-Cuban Jazz Moods =

Studio album by Dizzy Gillespie and Machito
- Released: 1976
- Recorded: June 4–5, 1975
- Studio: Generation Sound Studios, NYC
- Genre: Jazz
- Length: 31:51
- Label: Pablo; 2310-771
- Producer: Arturo 'Chico' O'Farrill & Mario Bauzá

Dizzy Gillespie chronology
Jazz Maturity...Where It's Coming From (1975)	Afro-Cuban Jazz Moods (1976)	The Dizzy Gillespie Big 7 (1975)

Machito chronology
Soul of Machito (1975)	Afro-Cuban Jazz Moods (1976)	Fire Works (1977)

Afro-Cuban Jazz Moods is a 1976 album by Dizzy Gillespie and Machito, featuring arrangements by Chico O'Farrill, recorded in 1975 and released on the Pablo label.

== Reception ==
The AllMusic review called the album "a historic recording session".

Professional ratings
Review scores
Source	Rating
AllMusic	3/5 stars
The Rolling Stone Jazz Record Guide	4/5 stars

== Track listing ==
All compositions by Chico O'Farrill.

1. "Oro, Incienso y Mirra" - 15:38
2. "Galidoscopico" - 5:05
3. "Pensativo" - 5:20
4. "Exuberante" - 5:48

== Personnel ==
- Dizzy Gillespie - trumpet
- Machito - marimba, clavinet, leader
- Manny Duran, Paul Gonzalez, Raul Gonzalez Jr., Victor Paz - trumpet, flugelhorn
- Jerry Chamberlain, Jack Jeffers, Lewis Kahn, Barry Morrow - trombone
- Don Corrado, Brooks Tillotson - French horn
- Bob Stewart - tuba
- Mauricio Smith - alto saxophone, flute, piccolo
- Mario Bauzá - alto saxophone, clarinet
- Mario Rivera - tenor saxophone, alto flute
- Jose Madera Sr. - tenor saxophone, clarinet
- Leslie Yahonikan - baritone saxophone, bass clarinet
- Jorge Dalto - electric piano
- Dana McCurdy - synthesizer
- Carlos Castillo - electric bass
- Mickey Roker - drums
- Julito Grillo, Raymond Hernandez - African drums
- Pepin Pepin - congas
- Mario Grillo - bongos, cowbell
- Jose Madera Jr. - timpani
- Chico O'Farrill - arranger, conductor
