= Beautiful (Candido Camero album) =

Studio album by Candido Camero
- Released: 1970
- Recorded: October 20 & 27, 1970
- Genre: Jazz
- Length: 46:42
- Label: Blue Note
- Producer: Joe Cain

Candido Camero chronology
Man of a Thousand Fingers (1969)	Beautiful (1970)	Drum Fever (1973)

Beautiful is an album by Cuban jazz percussionist Candido Camero recorded in 1970 and released on the Blue Note label. The album has sonic influences from North America, West Africa and Cuba itself.

== Reception ==
The Allmusic review by Matt Collar awarded the album 3 stars stating "Beautiful isn't the most essential of Candido's recordings, but should hold a fascination for funk-jazz enthusiasts".

Professional ratings
Review scores
Source	Rating
Allmusic	3/5 stars
The Penguin Guide to Jazz Recordings	3/4 stars

== Track listing ==
All compositions by Joe Cain and Candido Camero except as indicated

1. "I'm on My Way" (Richie Havens) - 3:11
2. "Tic Tac Toe" (Steve Cropper, Donald "Duck" Dunn, Al Jackson, Jr., Booker T. Jones) - 4:03
3. "Hey, Western Union Man" (Jerry Butler, Kenny Gamble, Leon Huff) - 3:29
4. "Serenade to a Savage" (Joe Garland) - 4:36
5. "New World in the Morning" (Roger Whittaker) - 3:28
6. "Beautiful" - 2:54
7. "I Shouldn't Believe" (Kelly Montgomery) - 3:26
8. "Money Man" - 5:07
9. "Ghana Spice, Pt. 1" - 3:06
10. "Ghana Spice, Pt. 2" - 4:22
  - Recorded at A&R Studios in New York City on October 20 (tracks 1–3 & 5) and October 27 (tracks 4 & 6–10), 1970.

== Personnel ==
- Candido Camero - conga, bongos
- Bernie Glow, Pat Russo - trumpet (tracks 1–3 & 5–10)
- Alan Raph - trombone, bass trombone (tracks 1–3 & 5–10)
- Joe Grimm - soprano saxophone, baritone saxophone (tracks 1–3 & 5–10)
- Frank Anderson - piano, organ
- David Spinozza - guitar
- Jerry Jemmott (tracks 1–3 & 5), Richard Davis - electric bass
- Herbie Lovelle - drums
- Joe Cain - arranger
