= Afro-Cuban jazz =

Music genre

- Stylistic origins: Son cubano; son montuno; jazz
- Cultural origins: Cuban immigrants in New York City, United States
- Typical instruments: Piano; congas; trumpet; trombone; bass guitar; claves; timbales; bongos; saxophone; clarinet

Afro-Cuban jazz is the earliest form of Latin jazz. It mixes Afro-Cuban clave-based rhythms with jazz harmonies and techniques of improvisation. Afro-Cuban music has deep roots in African ritual and rhythm. The genre emerged in the early 1940s with the Cuban musicians Mario Bauzá and Frank Grillo "Machito" in the band Machito and his Afro-Cubans in New York City. In 1947, the collaborations of bebop trumpeter Dizzy Gillespie and percussionist Chano Pozo brought Afro-Cuban rhythms and instruments, such as the tumbadora and the bongo, into the East Coast jazz scene. Early combinations of jazz with Cuban music, such as "Manteca" and "Mangó Mangüé", were commonly referred to as "Cubop" for Cuban bebop.

During its first decades, the Afro-Cuban jazz movement was stronger in the United States than in Cuba. In the early 1970s, Kenny Dorham and his Orquesta Cubana de Música Moderna, and later Irakere, brought Afro-Cuban jazz into the Cuban music scene, influencing styles such as songo.

== History ==
=== "Spanish tinge"—the Cuban influence in early jazz ===
Although clave-based Afro-Cuban jazz did not appear until the mid-20th century, the Cuban influence was present at the birth of jazz. African-American music began incorporating Afro-Cuban musical motifs in the 19th century when the habanera gained international popularity. The habanera was the first written music to be rhythmically based on an African motif. The habanera rhythm (also known as "congo" or "tango") can be thought of as a combination of tresillo and the backbeat.

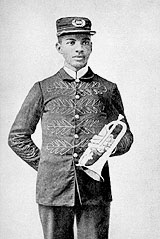
W. C. Handy aged 19, 1892

Musicians from Havana and New Orleans took the twice-daily ferry between both cities to perform, and the habanera took root. John Storm Roberts states that the musical genre habanera "reached the U.S. 20 years before the first rag was published". For more than a quarter-century in which the cakewalk, ragtime, and jazz were forming, the habanera was a consistent part of African-American popular music. Early New Orleans jazz bands had habaneras in their repertoire, and the tresillo/habanera figure was a rhythmic staple of jazz at the turn of the 20th century. Comparing the music of New Orleans with the music of Cuba, Wynton Marsalis said that the tresillo is the New Orleans clave. "St. Louis Blues" (1914) by W. C. Handy has a habanera/tresillo bass line. The first measures are shown below.

Handy noted a reaction to the habanera rhythm included in Will H. Tyler's "Maori": "I observed that there was a sudden, proud and graceful reaction to the rhythm...White dancers, as I had observed them, took the number in stride. I began to suspect that there was something Negroid in that beat." After noting a similar reaction to the same rhythm in "La Paloma", Handy included this rhythm in his "St. Louis Blues," the instrumental copy of "Memphis Blues," the chorus of "Beale Street Blues," and other compositions."

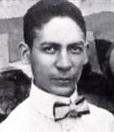
Jelly Roll Morton

Jelly Roll Morton considered the tresillo/habanera (which he called the Spanish tinge) to be an essential ingredient of jazz. Morton stated, "Now in one of my earliest tunes, 'New Orleans Blues', you can notice the Spanish tinge. In fact, if you can't manage to put tinges of Spanish in your tunes, you will never be able to get the right seasoning, I call it, for jazz—Morton (1938: Library of Congress Recording)." An excerpt of "New Orleans Blues" is shown below. In the excerpt, the left hand plays the tresillo rhythm, while the right hand plays variations on cinquillo.

Although the origin of jazz syncopation may never be known, there's evidence that the habanera/tresillo existed at its conception. Buddy Bolden, the first known jazz musician, is credited with creating the big four, a habanera-based pattern. The big four (below) was the first syncopated bass drum pattern to deviate from the standard on-the-beat march. As the example below shows, the second half of the big four pattern is the habanera rhythm.

In Early Jazz: Its Roots and Musical Development, Gunther Schuller states,

It is probably safe to say that by and large the simpler African rhythmic patterns survived in jazz... because they could be adapted more readily to European rhythmic conceptions. Some survived, others were discarded as the Europeanization progressed. It may also account for the fact that patterns such as [tresillo have]... remained one of the most useful and common syncopated patterns in jazz.

The Cuban influence is evident in many pre-1940s jazz tunes, but rhythmically they are all based on single-celled motifs such as tresillo, and do not contain an overt two-celled, clave-based structure. "Caravan", written by Juan Tizol and first performed in 1936, is an example of an early pre-Latin jazz composition. It is not clave-based. On the other hand, jazzy renditions of Don Azpiazú's "The Peanut Vendor" ("El manicero") by Louis Armstrong (1930), Duke Ellington (1931), and Stan Kenton (1948), are all firmly in-clave since the 2-3 guajeo provides the primary counterpoint to the melody throughout the entire song.

=== Mario Bauzá and Machito ===
The consensus among musicians and musicologists is that the first jazz piece to be based in-clave was "Tanga" (1943) composed by Cuban-born Mario Bauza and recorded by Machito and his Afro-Cubans. "Tanga" began humbly as a spontaneous descarga (Cuban jam session) with jazz solos superimposed on top.

The first descarga that made the world take notice is traced to a Machito rehearsal on May 29, 1943, at the Park Palace Ballroom, at 110th Street and 5th Avenue. At this time, Machito was at Fort Dix (New Jersey) in his fourth week of basic training. The day before, at La Conga Club, Mario Bauzá, Machito's trumpeter and music director, heard pianist Luis Varona and bassist Julio Andino play El Botellero composition and arrangements of the Cuban-born Gilberto Valdez which would serve as a permanent sign off (end the dance) tune.

On this Monday evening, Dr. Bauzá leaned over the piano and instructed Varona to play the same piano vamp he did the night before. Varona's left hand began the introduction of Gilberto Valdés' El Botellero. Bauzá then instructed Julio Andino what to play; then the saxes; then the trumpets. The broken chord sounds soon began to take shape into an Afro-Cuban jazzed up melody. Gene Johnson's alto sax then emitted oriental-like jazz phrases. Afro-Cuban jazz was invented when Bauzá composed "Tanga" (African word for marijuana) that evening.

Thereafter, whenever "Tanga" was played, it sounded different, depending on a soloist's individuality. In August, 1948, when trumpeter Howard McGhee soloed with Machito's orchestra at the Apollo Theatre, his ad-libs to "Tanga" resulted in "Cu-Bop City," a tune which was recorded by Roost Records months later. The jams which took place at the Royal Roots, Bop City, and Birdland between 1948 and 1949, when Howard McGhee, tenor saxophonist Brew Moore, Charlie Parker and Dizzy Gillespie sat in with the Machito orchestra, were unrehearsed, uninhibited, unheard of before jam sessions which at the time, master of ceremonies Symphony Sid called Afro-Cuban jazz.

The Machito orchestra's ten- or fifteen-minute jams were the first in Latin music to break away from the traditional under-four-minute recordings. In February, 1949, the Machito orchestra became the first to set a precedent in Latin music when it featured tenor saxophonist Flip Phillips in a five-minute recording of "Tanga." The twelve-inch 78 RPM, part of The Jazz Scene album, sold for $25.

— Max Salazar (1997).

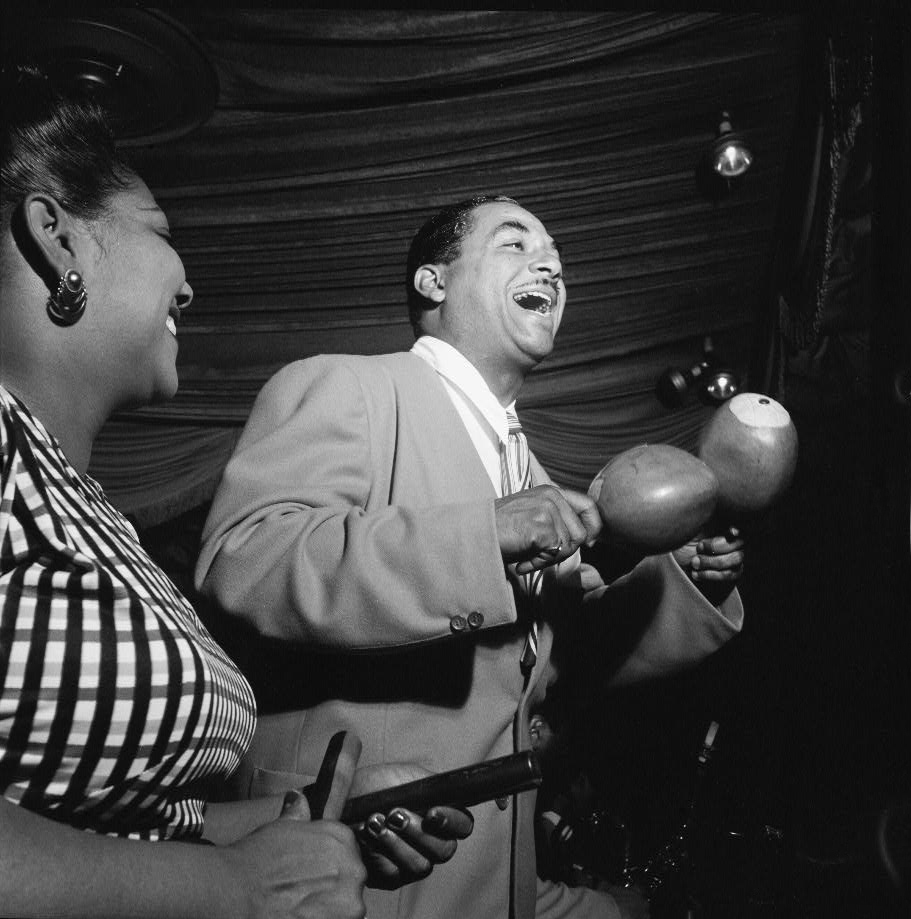
Machito and his sister Graciella Grillo

The right hand of the "Tanga" piano guajeo is in the style known as ponchando, a type of non-arpeggiated guajeo using block chords. The sequence of attack-points is emphasized, rather than a sequence of different pitches. As a form of accompaniment it can be played in a strictly repetitive fashion or as a varied motif akin to jazz comping.

The following example is in the style of a 1949 recording by Machito, with René Hernández on piano.

==== Ten innovations by Machito's Afro-Cubans ====
Written by Bobby Sanabria, published on November 28, 2007 on a blog called latinjazz@yahoogroups

1. The first band to make congas, bongo, and timbales the standard percussion in Afro-Cuban based dance music. The use of broken bell patterns by the bongocero in mambo horn sections, the increased rhythmic vocabulary of the conga drum and its function in a band setting, the increased importance of the timbales in setting up figures played by the horns and accenting them as a jazz drummer would do in a big band. e.g. "Nagüe," also the first recorded example of all three percussion instruments playing as a section.
2. The first band to explore jazz arranging techniques with Afro-Cuban rhythms on a consistent basis, giving it an identifiable sound. Cuban big band arranger Chico O'Farill stated, "This was a new concept in interpreting Cuban music with as much (harmonic) richness as possible. You have to understand how important this was. It made every other band that came after, followers."
3. The first band to explore modal harmony from a jazz arranging perspective through the recording of "Tanga". Of note is the 'sheet of sound' effect in the arrangement through the use of multiple layering.
4. The first big band to explore, from an Afro-Cuban rhythmic perspective, large-scale extended compositional works. e.g. "The Afro-Cuban Jazz Suite" by Chico O'Farill.
5. The first band to combine big band arranging techniques within an original composition with jazz oriented soloists using an Afro-Cuban based rhythm section, e.g. Gene Johnson – alto, Brew Moore – tenor, composition – "Tanga" (1943).
6. The first multi-racial band in the United States.
7. The first band in the United States to use the term "Afro-Cuban" in its name (Machito & The Afro-Cubans), alluding to the West African roots of their music. This was an overlooked contribution by the orchestra to the burgeoning civil rights movement which compelled the Latin and African-American communities of New York to deal with their West African musical roots.
8. The first Afro-Cuban dance band to explore clave conterpoint from an arranging standpoint. The ability to weave seamlessly from one side of the clave to the other without breaking its rhythmic integrity within the structure of a musical arrangement.
9. Music director Mario Bauzá and lead vocalist Machito promoted a standard of excellence for subsequent band leaders, such as José Curbelo, Tito Puente, Marcelino Guerra, Tito Rodriguez, and Elmo Garcia. Although it could be argued that Xavier Cugat established such a standard much earlier with his orchestra at the Waldorf Astoria Hotel (1931), the sound emulated by bandleaders in New York City was different from Cugat's. Cugat performed for the high society of New York City, not the Latino community in East Harlem (El Barrio) and the South Bronx. Cugat's music was one they may have heard on the radio, but this community had little access to it.
10. The Machito Afro-Cubans provided a forum for progressive musical ideas, compositions, and arrangements. They explored the fusion of Afro Cuban music with jazz arranging and jazz-oriented soloists in a multiracial framework.

Bauzá developed the 3-2/2-3 clave concept and terminology. A chord progression can begin on either side of clave. When the progression begins on the three-side, the song or song section is said to be in 3-2 clave. When the chord progression begins on the two-side, it is in 2-3 clave.

In North America, salsa and Latin jazz charts commonly represent clave in two measures of cut-time (2/2); this is most likely the influence of jazz conventions.

When clave is written in two measures (above), changing from one clave sequence to the other is a matter of reversing the order of the measures. Bauzá balanced Latin and jazz musicians in Machito's band to realize his vision of Afro-Cuban jazz. He mastered both types of music, but it took time for him to teach the jazz musicians in Machito's band about clave. When trumpeter Doc Cheatham joined the band, Machito fired him after two nights because he could not cope with clave.

When Mario first utilized Edgar Sampson to write the very first drafts of arrangements for the Machito and his Afro-Cubans, he would draw three sticks for Sampson underneath the bar with the three-side and two sticks underneath the bar with the two-side. This way he would always know rhythmically where he was in the chart and supervise Sampson who was unaware of the clave concept in Cuban music. Mario utilized Sampson's harmonic mastery and Mario utilized his rhythmic mastery. Sampson asked Mario, "Why does it have to be this way?" Mario told me that he looked at Sampson and said "This is what makes Cuban music Cuban!"

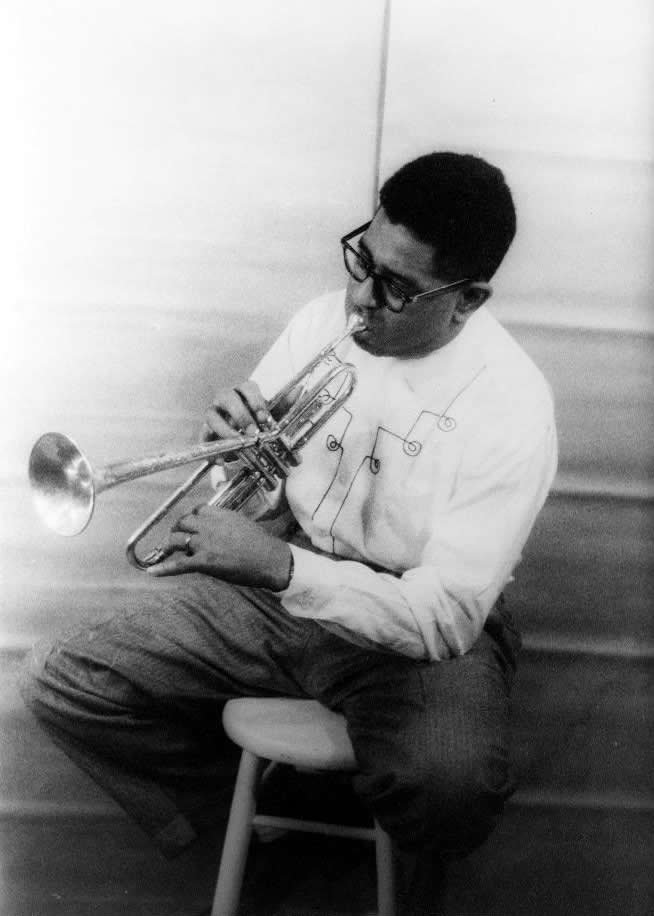
Dizzy Gillespie (1955)

=== Dizzy Gillespie and Chano Pozo ===
Mario Bauzá introduced bebop innovator Dizzy Gillespie to the Cuban conga drummer, dancer, composer, and choreographer Chano Pozo. The brief collaboration of Gillespie and Pozo produced some of the most enduring Afro-Cuban jazz standards.

"Manteca" (1947), co-written by Gillespie and Pozo, is the first jazz standard to be rhythmically based on clave. According to Gillespie, Pozo composed the layered, contrapuntal guajeos (Afro-Cuban ostinatos) of the A section and the introduction, while Gillespie wrote the bridge. Gillespie recounted: "If I'd let it go like [Chano] wanted it, it would've been strictly Afro-Cuban, all the way. There wouldn't have been a bridge.... I ... thought I was writing an eight-bar bridge. But after eight bars I hadn't resolved back to B-flat, so I had to keep on going and ended up writing a sixteen-bar bridge." It was the bridge that gave "Manteca" a typical jazz harmonic structure, setting the piece apart from Bauzá's modal "Tanga" of a few years earlier. Arrangements with a "Latin" A section and a swung B section, with all choruses swung during solos, became common practice with many "Latin tunes" of the jazz standard repertoire. This approach can be heard on pre-1980 recordings of "Manteca", "A Night in Tunisia", "Tin Tin Deo," and "On Green Dolphin Street."

Gillespie's collaboration with Pozo brought African-based rhythms into bebop, a post-modernist art form. While pushing the boundaries of harmonic improvisation, cu-bop as it was called, also drew more directly from Africa, rhythmically.

Early performances of "Manteca" reveal that despite their enthusiasm for collaborating, Gillespie and Pozo were not very familiar with each other's music. The members of Gillespie's band were unaccustomed to guajeos, overly swinging and accenting them in an atypical fashion. Thomas Owens observes: "Once the theme ends and the improvisation begins, ... Gillespie and the full band continue the bebop mood, using swing eighths in spite of Pozo's continuing even eighths, until the final A section of the theme returns. Complete assimilation of Afro-Cuban rhythms and improvisations on a harmonic ostinato was still a few years away for the beboppers in 1947." On a live 1948 recording of "Manteca," someone is heard playing the 3-2 son clave pattern on claves throughout a good portion of this 2-3 song.

The rhythm of the melody of the A section is identical to a common mambo bell pattern:

=== 1940s –1970s ===
In early 1947 Stan Kenton recorded "Machito," written by his collaborator / arranger Pete Rugolo. Some consider the piece to be the first Afro-Cuban jazz recording by American jazz musicians. John Storm Roberts observes that the piece "has no Latino instrumentalists on it, a lack of that is obvious; the crisp, fast montuno with which the piece opens is weighed down by not-so-adept drumming from Shelly Mann." Later, on 6 December of the same year, Kenton recorded an arrangement of the son "The Peanut Vendor" with members of Machito's rhythm section. Kenton continued to work with Afro-Cuban rhythms and musicians for another decade; the 1956 Kenton album Cuban Fire! was written as an Afro-Cuban suite by Johnny Richards.

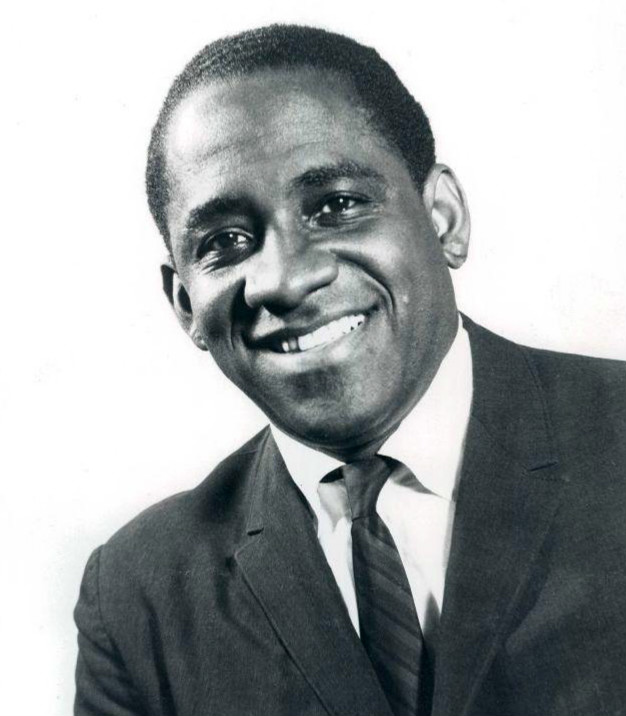
Mongo Santamaría (1969)

Cuban percussionist Mongo Santamaría first recorded his composition "Afro Blue" in 1959. "Afro Blue" was the first jazz standard built upon a typical African three-against-two (3:2) cross-rhythm, or hemiola.

The song begins with the bass repeatedly playing 6 cross-beats per each measure of 12/8, or 6 cross-beats per 4 main beats—6:4 (two cells of 3:2). The following example shows the original ostinato "Afro Blue" bass line. The slashed noteheads indicate the main beats (not bass notes), where you would normally tap your foot to "keep time."

In the mid-1940s, the mambo craze originated with the recordings of Perez Prado, who included jazz elements, and ideas from Stravinsky in his arrangements.

Guajeos (Afro-Cuban ostinato melodies), or guajeo fragments are commonly used motifs in Latin jazz melodies. For example, the A section of "Sabor" is a 2-3 onbeat/offbeat guajeo, minus some notes. The following excerpt is from a performance by Cal Tjader.

=== 1980s New York City ===
Afro-Cuban jazz has been for most of its history a matter of superimposing jazz phrasing over Cuban rhythms. In the 1980s a generation of New York City musicians had come of age playing both salsa dance music and jazz.

In 1967 brothers Jerry and Andy González at the ages of 15 and 13 formed a Latin jazz quintet inspired by Cal Tjader's group. with Jerry on congas and Andy on bass. During 1974–1976 they were members of one of Eddie Palmieri's experimental salsa groups. Andy González recounts, "We were into improvising... doing that thing Miles Davis was doing—playing themes and just improvising on the themes of songs, and we never stopped playing through the whole set."

While in Palmieri's band, the González brothers started showing up in the DownBeat Readers' Poll. In 1974, the González brothers and Manny Oquendo founded the salsa band Libre and experimented with jazz and Afro-Cuban rhythms. Libre recorded Charlie Parker's "Donna Lee" as a danzón, Miles Davis's "Tune Up" as a conga de comparsa, and Freddie Hubbard's "Little Sunflower" as a mambo. In the 1980s, Tito Puente began recording and performing Latin jazz. The González brothers worked with Puente as well as Dizzy Gillespie. McCoy Tyner hired the brothers when he played Afro-Cuban jazz. Other New York musicians included Bobby Sanabria, Steve Turre, Conrad Herwig, Hilton Ruiz, Chris Washburn, Ralph Irizarry, David Sánchez, and Dave Valentine. Latin jazz musicians in San Francisco included John Santos' Machete Ensemble, Rebeca Mauleón, Mark Levine, Omar Sosa, and Orestes Vilato.

Jan L. Hartong's Nueva Manteca is based in The Hague, Netherlands, and Yilian Cañizares in Lausanne, Switzerland.

=== The Cuban branch ===
"Jazz bands" began forming in Cuba as early as the 1920s. These bands often included both Cuban popular music and popular North American jazz, and show tunes in their repertoires. Despite this musical versatility, the movement of blending Afro-Cuban rhythms with jazz was not strong in Cuba itself for decades. As Leonardo Acosta observes: "Afro-Cuban jazz developed simultaneously in New York and Havana, with the difference that in Cuba it was a silent and almost natural process, practically imperceptible".Cuba's contribution to the genre came relatively late, beginning with the band Irakere.

With Irakere, a new era in Cuban jazz begins in 1973, one that will extend all the way to the present. At the same time, this period represents the culmination of a series of individual and collective efforts from our so-called transition period, which will end with the Orquesta Cubana de Música Moderna. Irakere was in part a product of the Moderna, as its founding members completed their musical training in that orchestra and also played jazz in the different quartets and quintets that were created with the OCMM. Among the founders of Irakere were pianist Chucho Valdéz, its director since the beginning, [and] saxophonist Paquito D'Rivera, who acted as assistant director".

"Chékere-son" (1976) introduced a style of "Cubanized" bebop-flavored horn lines, that departed from the more "angular" guajeo-based lines typical of Cuban popular music.

"Chékere-son" is an extremely interesting one. It's based on a legendary 1945 Charlie Parker bebop composition called "Billie's Bounce." Almost every phrase of the Parker song can be found in "Chékere-son" but it's all jumbled together in a very clever and compelling way. David Peñalosa sees the track as a pivotal one – perhaps the first really satisfying fusion of clave and bebop horn lines".

The horn line style introduced in "Chékere-son" is heard today in Afro-Cuban jazz, and the contemporary popular dance genre known as timba. Another important Irakere contribution is their use of batá and other Afro-Cuban folkloric drums. "Bacalao con pan" is the first song recorded by Irakere to use batá. The tune combines the folkloric drums, jazzy dance music, and distorted electric guitar with wah-wah pedal.

According to Raúl A. Fernández, the Orquesta Cubana de Música Moderna members would not have been allowed by the orquesta to record the unconventional song. The musicians travelled to Santiago to record it. "Somehow the tune made it from Santiago to radio stations in Havana where it became a hit; Irakere was formally organized a little bit later".

Several of the founding members did not always appreciate Irakere's fusion of jazz and Afro-Cuban elements. They saw the Cuban folk elements as a type of nationalistic "fig leaf", cover for their true love—jazz. They were obsessed with jazz. Cuba's Ministry of Culture is said to have viewed jazz as the music of "imperialist America." Pablo Menéndez, founder of Mezcla, recalls: "Irakere were jazz musicians who played stuff like 'Bacalao con pan' with a bit of a tongue in cheek attitude—'for the masses.' I remember Paquito d'Rivera thought it was pretty funny stuff (as opposed to 'serious' stuff)" (2011: web). In spite of the ambivalence by some members towards Irakere's Afro-Cuban folkloric/jazz fusion, their experiments changed Cuban popular music, Latin jazz, and salsa.

Another important Cuban jazz musician is pianist Gonzalo Rubalcaba, whose innovative jazz guajeos revolutionized Cuban-style piano in the 1980s. Like the musicians of his generation who founded the timba era, Rubalcaba is a product of the Cuban music education system. He studied both piano and drums. Rubalcaba began his classical musical training at Manuel Saumell Conservatory at age 9, where he had to choose piano; he moved up to "middle-school" at Amadeo Roldan Conservatory, and finally earned his degree in music composition from Havana's Institute of Fine Arts in 1983. By that time he was already playing in clubs and music halls in Havana.

Many Cuban jazz bands, such as the saxophonist Tony Martinez's group, perform at a level few non-Cubans can match rhythmically. The clave matrix offers infinite possibilities for rhythmic textures in jazz. The Cuban-born drummer Dafnis Prieto in particular, has been a trailblazer in expanding the parameters of clave experimentation. Afro-Cuban singer Daymé Arocena has been described as a "cross between Celia Cruz and Aretha Franklin".

== Clave license ==
More than a half century ago, Mario Bauzá developed arranging in-clave to an art. Another name for clave is guide-pattern, and that is how Bauzá related to it. He taught Tito Puente, and Puente's arrangers learned from him.

The techniques were passed down from one generation to the next. Many educated Cuban musicians reject the idea of 3-2/2-3 clave. Dafnis Prieto and Alain Pérez reject the concept. Many younger musicians reject the concept of "clave rules". Pérez states, "I just don't treat the clave as a study or a profound analysis conceived around where it overlaps and where it comes in. I didn't learn it in that way".

Bobby Sanabria laments the pervasiveness of this attitude in Cuba. "The lack of clave consciousness in Cuba is starting to be felt more and more where the rhythmic equilibrium established by the clave direction is being sacrificed due to lack of knowledge in how to work with it from an arranging standpoint by young arrangers especially in the timba movement" Perhaps Juan Formell, founder of Los Van Van, summed up this contemporary Cuban clave attitude best. "We Cubans like to think we have 'clave license'...and we don't feel obsessed about the clave as many others do".
