= Palladium Ballroom =

New York City night club

Coordinates: 40°45′48″N 73°58′58″W

Palladium Ballroom

The Palladium Ballroom was a New York City night club located at the northeast corner of Broadway and 53rd Street in Manhattan. it opened on March 15, 1946, and closed in 1966 after a 1961 drug raid led to the loss of its license to sell liquor.

The mambo craze in the United States that started in 1948 began at the Palladium Ballroom.

== Big Three ==
In 1948, the Palladium Ballroom gained in stature because of the Big Three acts: Tito Puente, Tito Rodríguez, and Machito. The careers of the Big Three expanded on the strength of their bookings there. These bands recorded many mambo hits such as "Asia Minor" and "Babarabatiri", "Picadillo", "Ran Kan Kan", and "Mambo Mona". Dámaso Pérez Prado's "Mambo No. 5" (1952) was a cross-over hit.

== Dancers and dances ==
The Palladium was known for its dancers as well as its music, fueled by weekly dance competitions and pie contests along with a Female Best Leg Contest. Ability to dance, not class or color, was the social currency. The Palladium's top dancers, Augie and Margo Rodríguez were the mambo dancing champions. Carlos Arroyo, who partnered with Mike Ramos as The Cha Cha Taps, and also known as Mr Cha Cha Taps is featured in the 1955 short film Mambo Madness. Another popular act was the groups of The Mambo and Cha-Cha Aces Carlos and Mike-Aces with Andy and Tina Vasquez. Joe Vega and Freddie Rios did their side by side act. Marilyn Winters covered the entire floor in her one-woman show, as did Carmen Cruz. The Palladium became a showcase for the chachachá, merengue, and the pachanga. These became as popular as the mambo.

At its height, the Palladium attracted Hollywood and Broadway stars, especially on Wednesday nights, which included a free dance lesson. Dance instructors such as "Killer Joe" Piro — who briefly served as master of ceremonies when Federico Pagani was not available — Augie and Margo were featured dancers there. Pedro Aguilar, better known as Cuban Pete, and Millie Donay appeared internationally. Carmen Marie Padilla offered mass dance lessons. Michael Terrace was one of the Mambo-niks and a regular performer who was later associated with the film Dirty Dancing.

== Jazz musicians, celebrities and Latin bands ==
The Palladium was near jazz clubs on West 52nd Street such as Birdland, CuBop City, and the Onyx Club. Jazz musicians and some celebrities sat in and played with the Latin bands. Others watched and enjoyed the show. Examples of notables who went to the ballroom include Count Basie, Desi Arnaz, Marlon Brando, Dave Brubeck, Paul Desmond, Joe Morello, Sammy Davis Jr., Pupi Campo Duke Ellington, Ella Fitzgerald, Dizzy Gillespie, Billie Holiday, Gene Krupa, Jerry Lewis, Peter Lawford, Dean Martin, Frank Sinatra, George Burns, Bing Crosby, Buddy Rich, Tony Bennett, George Shearing, Cal Tjader, Pedro Vargas, Chano Pozo, Arturo Sandoval, and Ed Sullivan. Wayne Shorter, who lived in the New York City area during the ballroom's heyday, composed a piece during the 1970s called "Palladium" while he was a member of the jazz-fusion group Weather Report. The song appears on their album Heavy Weather, and features a driving Latin rhythm.

== Closing ==
By the early 1960s, tastes had shifted, and the Palladium closed in 1966, after a drug raid in 1961 led to the loss of its license to sell liquor.
