= Drum pedal =

A drum pedal is a foot-controlled pedal used to play a drum. The most common types are:

- Bass drum pedal
- Hi-hat (cymbals) pedal
- Timpani pedal
