= Mumbo =

Mumbo may refer to:

- Mumbo, a deity from the African new religious movement Mumboism
- Mumbo Island, an island in Lake Malawi
- Mumbo, a villain from the Teen Titans animated series
- A King of Quendor from the Zork universe
- "Mumbo", a song by Paul McCartney & Wings from the album Wild Life
- Mumbo sauce, a condiment

== See also ==
- Mambo (disambiguation)
- Mumbo Jumbo (disambiguation)
