= Yilian Cañizares =

Cuban-Swiss violinist

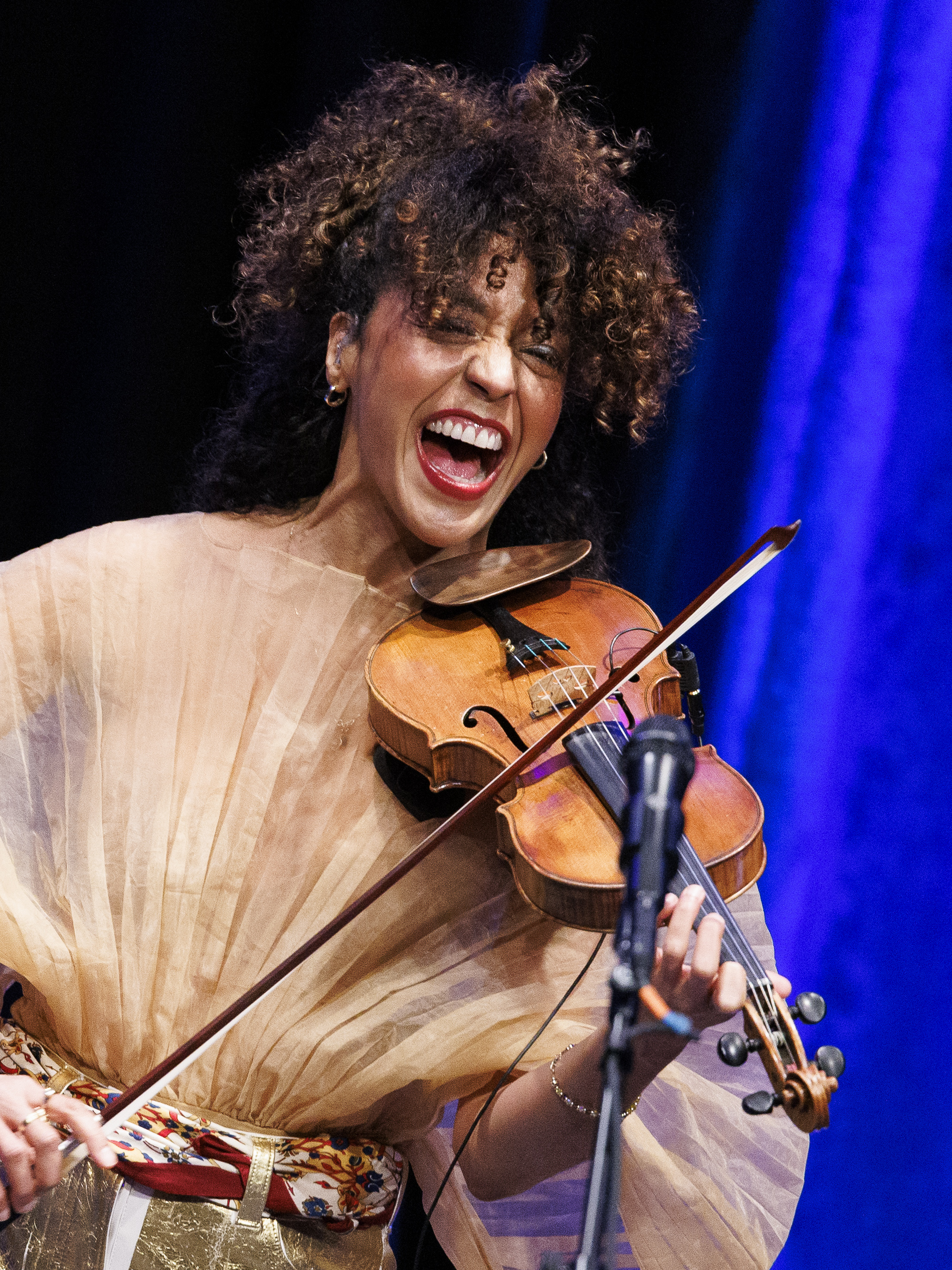
- Cañizares performing in 2026

Background information
- Also known as: Yilian Cañizares
- Origin: Havana, Cuba,
- Genres: jazz, World music, Music of Cuba
- Occupation: musician/composer
- Instrument: violin
- Years active: 2009—present
- Label: Planeta Y
- Website: yiliancanizares.com

Yilian Cañizares is a Cuban-Swiss musician.

== Biography ==
Yilian Cañizares was born in Havana, Cuba, and studied violin there, following the Russian violin school. In 1997, she moved to Venezuela, in order to pursue her studies at the "Academia Latinoamericana de violin". Three years later, she moved again, to Switzerland, in order to complete her studies at the Fribourg/Freiburg conservatory. In addition to her classical brackground. she became interested in Jazz and started developing her singing skills.

At the end of her studies, Cañizares started the band Ochumare, or "rainbow" in Yoruba, with David Brito (double bass) and Cyril Regamey (drums and percussions). She continued her career under her own name. She has been considered the raising star of the year 2013 by the French weekly Le Nouvel Observateur and the French magazine Les Inrockuptibles selected her album Invocación in the top ten 2015 South America albums.

In 2018 Cañizares and the Cuban pianist Omar Sosa released the album “Aguas”, featuring Inor Sotolongo as percussionist.

The new album, “Erzulie”, named after the Haitian goddess of love and freedom, was released on 15 November 2019. Recorded in New Orleans, the album features the participation of several guests including Christian Scott (trumpet), Michael League (double bass), Bill Laurance (piano), Bobby Sparks (organ) and Justin Stanton (keyboards). With this album, Yilian has been nominated for the Songlines Music Awards as best artist/album 2021.

Yilian has collaborated with artists like Chucho Valdés, Ibrahim Maalouf, Diego El Cigala, Youn Sun Nah, Omar Sosa, Dhafer Youssef, Richard Bona, Roberto Fonseca and El Comité.

She teaches violin and jazz improvisation at the Ecole de jazz et des musiques actuelles in Lausanne. She has remained in Switzerland and has acquired citizenship.

== Style ==
Cañizares's style reflects her various influences with shades of jazz, classical music and cuban music, with a lot of space left for improvisation. The French magazine Les Inrockuptibles describes her style as a jazz instrumentation mixed with Yoruba ritual percussion. She sings in Spanish, Yoruba and French. One of her hallmarks is simultaneously playing violin and singing.

== Discography ==
Ochumare Quartet

- 2009: Caminos
- 2011: Somos Ochumare

Yilian Cañizares

- 2013: Ochumare, Naïve Records
- 2015: Invocación, Naïve Records
- 2019 : Erzulie, Planeta Y

Omar Sosa & Yilian Cañizares

- 2018: Aguas, with Omar Sosa, Otá
- 2019 : Omar Sosa & Yilian Cañizares feat. Gustavo Ovalles - Live at Elbphilarmonie, Hamburg.
