= Mumbo Jumbo =

Mumbo Jumbo commonly refers to:

- Mumbo jumbo (phrase), an English phrase for a meaningless ritual or nonsense

Mumbo Jumbo may also refer to:

== Music ==
- Mumbo Jumbo (album), 2010 album by the band Air Supply
- "Mumbo Jumbo", 1990 song by Betty Boo on the album Boomania
- "Mumbo Jumbo", 2003 song by Foghat on the album Family Joules
- "Mumbo Jumbo", 1981 song by Squeeze on the album East Side Story
- Mumbo Jumbo, 1988 video album by Robert Plant
- "Mumbo Jumbo", 2017 song by Tierra Whack

== Video games ==
- MumboJumbo, video game developer and publisher
- Mumbo Jumbo (Banjo-Kazooie), video game character

== Other uses ==
- Mumbo Jumbo (novel), 1972 novel by Ishmael Reed
- Mumbo Jumbo (play), by Robin Glendinning
- Mumbo Jumbo (roller coaster), Flamingo Land Resort, UK

== See also ==
- Mumbo (disambiguation)
