= La Conga (nightclub) =

Nightclub in New York City

- Address: 57 W. 57th Street; 209 W. 51st Street at Broadway
- Location: Manhattan, New York
- Owner: Jack Harris
- Type: Nightclub
- Events: Rumba; Conga

Construction
- Opened: 1937

La Conga, also known as La Conga nightclub or La Conga club, was a Cuban nightclub located in midtown Manhattan in New York City.

== Early history ==
In September 1937, the La Conga Club was established in New York at 57 W. 57th Street. It was operated by Cubans Bobby Martyn, Miguel Roldan and Oscar Roche.

The club's diners and dancers enjoyed Rumba bands and Cuban music. Each night included a nightly Conga line, popularized by Cuban conga player Desi Arnaz in Miami and New York.

At the end of 1937, band leader George Olsen, began a two-month engagement. In February 1938, Enric Madriguera returned to La Conga with his orchestra.

The name La Conga was purchased for $50 in 1938 by Arthur Ganger, who frequently purchased nightclub names from the courts when they failed. Ganger was sued by the original tenants after selling the name to new owners for $50. The club was re-established by Jack Harris. With the new proprietors, the cabaret was located in the New York theatre district on 51st Street and Broadway. It was near the famed Birdland jazz club.

By 1939, the venue played a significant role in the early rise of Latin performers such as Desi Arnaz and Diosa Costello, who featured as headlining acts. In 1940, Machito and his Afro-Cubans Band debuted at La Conga.
