= Chano Pozo =

Cuban jazz percussionist, singer, dancer and composer (1915–1948)

Luciano "Chano" Pozo González
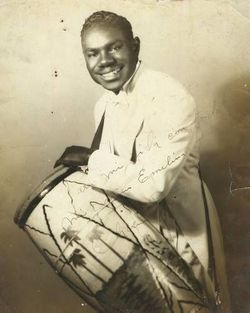

Background information
- Born: January 7, 1915; Havana, Cuba
- Died: December 2, 1948 (aged 33) Harlem, New York, U.S.
- Genres: Afro-Cuban jazz; salsa; son cubano; pachanga
- Occupations: Percussionist, singer, dancer, and composer
- Instrument: Timbadora
- Years active: 1929–1948

Luciano Pozo González (January 7, 1915 – December 2, 1948), known professionally as Chano Pozo, was a Cuban jazz percussionist, singer, dancer, and composer. Despite only living to the age of 33, he played a major role in the founding of Latin jazz. He co-wrote some of Dizzy Gillespie's Latin-flavored compositions, such as "Manteca" and "Tin Tin Deo", and was the first Latin percussionist in Gillespie's band. According to Rebeca Mauleón, "Few percussionists have played as integral a role in shaping Latin music as Luciano 'Chano' Pozo González."

== Early life ==
Luciano "Chano" Pozo González was born in Havana to Cecelio González and Carnación Pozo. Chano grew up with three sisters and a brother, as well as his older half brother, Félix Chappottín, who would later become one of the great Cuban soneros. The family struggled with poverty throughout his youth. His mother died when Chano was aged 11, and Cecelio took his family to live with his long-time mistress, Natalia, who was Felix's mother.

Chano showed an early interest in playing drums, and performed ably in Afro-Cuban religious ceremonies in which drumming was a key element. The family lived for many years at El África Solar (Africa neighborhood), a former slave quarters, by all accounts a foul and dangerous place, where it was said even the police were afraid to venture. In this environment criminal activities flourished, and Chano learned the ways of the street as means of survival. He dropped out of school after the third grade and earned a solid reputation as a rowdy tough guy, big for his age and exceptionally fit. He spent his days playing drums, fighting, drinking, and engaging in petty criminal activities, the latter of which landed him a stint in a youth reformatory. No official records document the crime he was sentenced for, though at least one account has him causing the accidental death of a foreign tourist, adding to a record of thievery, assault, and truancy. At the age of 13, Chano was sent to the reformatory in Guanajay, where he learned reading and writing, auto body repair, and honed his already exceptional skills playing a variety of drums.

=== Santería ===
During this time he became a devotee of Santería. Also known as "La Regla de Ocha", this is an Afro-Caribbean religion derived from traditional beliefs of the Yoruba people of Nigeria. Developed among Afro-Cuban slaves, the religion began as a blending of these West African spiritual beliefs and Catholic doctrine. Yoruba deities were identified with Catholic saints to fool the slave owners, as the Spanish colonialists had forbidden the practice of African religions. Chano pledged allegiance to the Catholic Saint Barbara, identified widely with Shango, the Yoruba god of fire and thunder, and took him as his personal protector. Both Shango and St. Barbara had associations with the color red, and for the rest of his life Chano would often carry a red scarf signifying his allegiance. Pozo was Abakwa and belonged to the Ekue Munanga Efo lodge.

Upon his release from Guanajay, Chano returned to his father's house in Havana. Cecelio persuaded his son to practice his trade of bootblack, but Chano's temperament was not suited for this occupation and he quit after less than a year. In 1929 he took a job selling newspapers for El País, Havana's most influential publication, hawking papers on a number of street corners. His forceful nature and success in selling brought him to the attention of newspaper owner and influential businessman Alfredo Suárez, who hired Chano as his personal driver and bodyguard. He was rumored to have performed duties as debt collector or "leg breaker" for Suarez. Chano spent his free time dancing, singing, fighting, chasing women and playing his drums.

== Carnival ==
Chano's reputation grew among the people each year, not only because of his physical prowess as a dancer, drummer, and success with women, but for the compositions he wrote for Carnival, during the nightly celebrations of which neighborhoods formed highly competitive comparsas, or street troupes. They consisted of singers, dancers, musicians, and the ever-present rumberos. Mostly young, street-toughened drummers, rumberos were integral to each comparsa (something like a "jam club"), since rumberos provided throbbing, sensuous rhythms regarded as the base for all Afro-Cuban music. In a few years Pozo was the most well-known and sought after rumbero in Cuba, with the most talented comparsas (local groups) vying for his services, and was regularly winning top cash prizes for his compositions. Chano elevated the status and reputation of rumbero to near mythic proportions with his swaggering attitude as he led his own comparsa through the streets and with increasing successes became a hero to Havana's poor people. Pozo and some of his fellow musicians wrote a conga music composition that earned them first prize in the city of Santiago de Cuba's carnival of 1940: "La Comparsa de los Dandys", a composition that some consider an unofficial theme song of Santiago de Cuba, and a familiar standard at many Latin American carnivals.

== Career in Cuba ==
Cuba was by this time a popular tourist destination, with the biggest hotels, The Sevilla Biltmore, the Nacional, and El Presidente catering to rich Americans and Europeans, and Chano was determined to break the color barrier that restricted the employment of dark skinned people. He began to court musicians and others who might help him by auditioning in unusual places—such as in front of the Cuban-owned radio station Azul, which broadcast popular recordings as well as live Cuban folk music. Chano befriended many musicians who worked there, playing his drum on the street to catch their attention as they arrived for work. Though admired for his prodigious talent, dark skinned blacks were prohibited from working most venues outside of the slums, and Chano searched for opportunities. He found that opportunity with Armando Trinidad, owner of the radio station. Armando persuaded Chano to work for him as the bouncer for Azul, where his imposing size and reputation kept rowdy crowds in check.

To survive racial marginalization in Cuba, he worked cleaning shoes and selling newspapers. He first performed as a dancer in a Havana troupe known as The Dandy. His brother was the Cuban trumpeter Felix Chapotín.

Once Pozo became famous, he also became renowned for his sense of fashion, including sometimes wearing an all-white top hat and tuxedo.

== Career in New York ==
In 1947, he immigrated to the U.S. in search of a better life. He was encouraged to do so by Mario Bauza and his childhood friend Miguelito Valdés. It was Mario Bauza who introduced Chano to Dizzy Gillespie who was looking to include a conga player into his musical group.

Chano Pozo is one of a handful of Cuban percussionists who came to the United States in the 1940s and '50s. Other notable congueros who came to the U.S. during that time include Cándido, Mongo Santamaría, Armando Peraza, Francisco Aguabella, Julito Collazo, Carlos Vidal Bolado, Desi Arnaz and Modesto Durán. Pozo moved to New York City in early 1947 with the encouragement of Miguelito Valdés, and participated in a recording session with Valdés, the legendary band leader Arsenio Rodríguez, Carlos Vidal Bolado and José Mangual, Sr.

In 1947, Pozo recorded what are considered the first commercial recordings of rumbas, columbia, guaguancós and abakuá in the album Afrocubano Rhythm 1, 2, 3 and 4. Produced by Gabriel Oller for the Spanish Music Center (SMC) label the recordings featured Pozo, along with Carlos Vidal Bolado, Arsenio Rodríguez as well as Miguelito Valdés, Kiki Rodríguez (brother of Arsenio), and Puerto Rican bongero José Mangual Sr.

In September 29, 1947, after Mario Bauzá introduced the two, Pozo featured in Dizzy Gillespie's Big Band at Carnegie Hall – considered "a milestone event in the development of Latin jazz" – and subsequently on a European tour. Their notable material includes "Cubana-Be/Cubana-Bop" (written by George Russell), and "Tin Tin Deo" and "Manteca", both co-written by Pozo.

== Death ==
Chano Pozo was shot and killed on December 2, 1948, in the El Rio Bar at 111th Street and Lenox Avenue in Harlem. The El Rio Bar no longer exists — even the small triangular block where it was located has been removed. Pozo's killer was a local bookie, marijuana dealer, and fellow Cuban named Eusebio "Cabito" (Little Corporal) Muñoz. Pozo is buried in the Colón Cemetery, Havana.

== Discography ==
- Dizzy Gillespie, The Complete RCA Victor Recordings (Bluebird, 1995)
- Illinois Jacquet & Ben Webster, The Kid and the Brute (Clef, 1955)
- Machito, Ritmo Caliente (Proper, 2002)
- Charlie Parker & Dizzy Gillespie, Diz 'n' Bird at Carnegie Hall (Roost, 1997)

== In popular culture ==
- Cuban drummer Chino Pozo claimed to be related to Chano Pozo.
- He was the inspiration for the poem by Jayne Cortez "I See Chano Pozo", included on her 1982 album There It Is.
- Pozo is featured (in animated form) in the fictional animated film Chico and Rita (2010), where the circumstances surrounding his death are included as part of the plot line.
- Pozo is mentioned in a monologue by character Roland Turner, played by John Goodman, in the 2013 film Inside Llewyn Davis. Turner claims to have learned Santeria and black arts in New Orleans from Pozo.
- Jazz musicians Poncho Sanchez and Terence Blanchard released the collaborative album Chano y Dizzy! in 2011.

== See also ==
- List of famous Cuban-Americans
- List of Cubans
