= Cuban Pete (film) =

1946 film by Jean Yarbrough

- Directed by: Jean Yarbrough
- Written by: Bernard Feins; Robert Presnell Sr. M. Coates Webster
- Starring: Desi Arnaz; Joan Fulton; Don Porter; Ethel Smith
- Cinematography: Maury Gertsman
- Edited by: Otto Ludwig
- Music by: Milton Rosen
- Color process: Black-and-white
- Production company: Universal Pictures
- Distributed by: Universal Pictures
- Release date: June 1946
- Running time: 60 minutes
- Country: United States
- Language: English

Cuban Pete is a 1946 American musical comedy film directed by Jean Yarbrough and starring the Cuban-born actor and musician Desi Arnaz. It was produced and distributed by Universal Pictures.

The film with a simple comedy plot contains many numbers of Cuban music and dance, including the song of the same name by Joseph Norman. It was used in the television show I Love Lucy (episodes: "The Diet", with Lucille Ball as Sally Sweet and "Lucy Goes to a Rodeo" as an alternative version, "Texas Pete") and in the 1994 film The Mask.

== Plot ==
Unable to complete the deal by telephone, advertising executive Roberts sends his assistant Ann to Cuba to lure a Cuban band, led by Desi Arnaz, on to an American radio program. Attracted to Ann, Arnaz and his band come to New York but complications arise when the squeaky-voiced, addle-brained sponsor of the program decides she wants to be the vocalist on the program.

== Accolades ==
=== American Film Institute recognition ===
- 2004: AFI's 100 Years...100 Songs:
  - "Cuban Pete" – Nominated
