= Pedro Aguilar =

Puerto Rican mambo dancer

Pedro "Cuban Pete" Aguilar (June 14, 1927 – January 13, 2009) was named "the greatest Mambo dancer ever" by Life magazine and Tito Puente. Pedro Aguilar was nicknamed "Cuban Pete" and el cuchillo.

Aguilar was born in San Juan, Puerto Rico. He took tap-dance training in childhood and had an early career in boxing. He then transitioned to dance; creating a rhythmically complex, visually arresting dancing style that electrified audiences. By his own count he invented 100 signature foot, torso and hand movements with names like the Porpoise, the Shimmy Shimmy and the Prayer.

His nickname, "Cuban Pete," was conferred on him, in 1949, at the famous Palladium dance hall in New York City, in reference to the classic mambo song "Cuban Pete" by Desi Arnaz. The moniker was endorsed by Arnaz himself. Aguilar won numerous prizes in Latin dancing during the Mambo era, together with his dance partner Millie Donay until 1956. He danced at the White House for President Dwight D. Eisenhower and later for President Lyndon B. Johnson. In the 1950s, Aguilar appeared at a British Royal Command Performance before Elizabeth II.

Aguilar also appeared on The Jackie Gleason Show. He was a recipient of many prestigious awards for his work, and remains the only Latin dancer recognized in the Latin Jazz exhibit at the Smithsonian Institution.

Aguilar made a career as a dancer, teacher and choreographer. He also worked for Warner Bros., in Los Angeles for many years. As a consultant on the film The Mambo Kings (1992), he taught Antonio Banderas and Armand Assante to mambo, and can be seen in several of the dance scenes.

In 2000, he collaborated with Edward Villella on the ballet Mambo No. 2 a.m., which had its premiere with the Miami City Ballet.

In 2002, a documentary, The Lucky Man (also entitled Game Boys) by German film-maker Dieter Weihl, featuring Aguilar, premiered at The Tiburon International Film Festival.

Barbara Craddock was his last dance partner (since 1998) and manager. Aguilar and Craddock were both inducted in the International Latin Music Hall of Fame.

On November 14, 2007, it was announced they were the recipients of the Latin Jazz USA Lifetime Achievement Awards at the 2007/08 Ms. Latina International Pageant, with the presentation on December 22, 2007, at the Manuel Artime Theater in Miami, Florida. They were the first Latin dancers to receive this award.

Aguilar died on January 13, 2009, from heart failure at Sinai Plaza Rehabilitation & Nursing Center, Miami, Florida. Aguilar is survived by his daughters Denise Gerard and Petrina Aguilar, son Sean P. Aguilar, granddaughter Gina Gerard and grandson Noah.
