= Machito =

Cuban jazz musician (1909–1984)

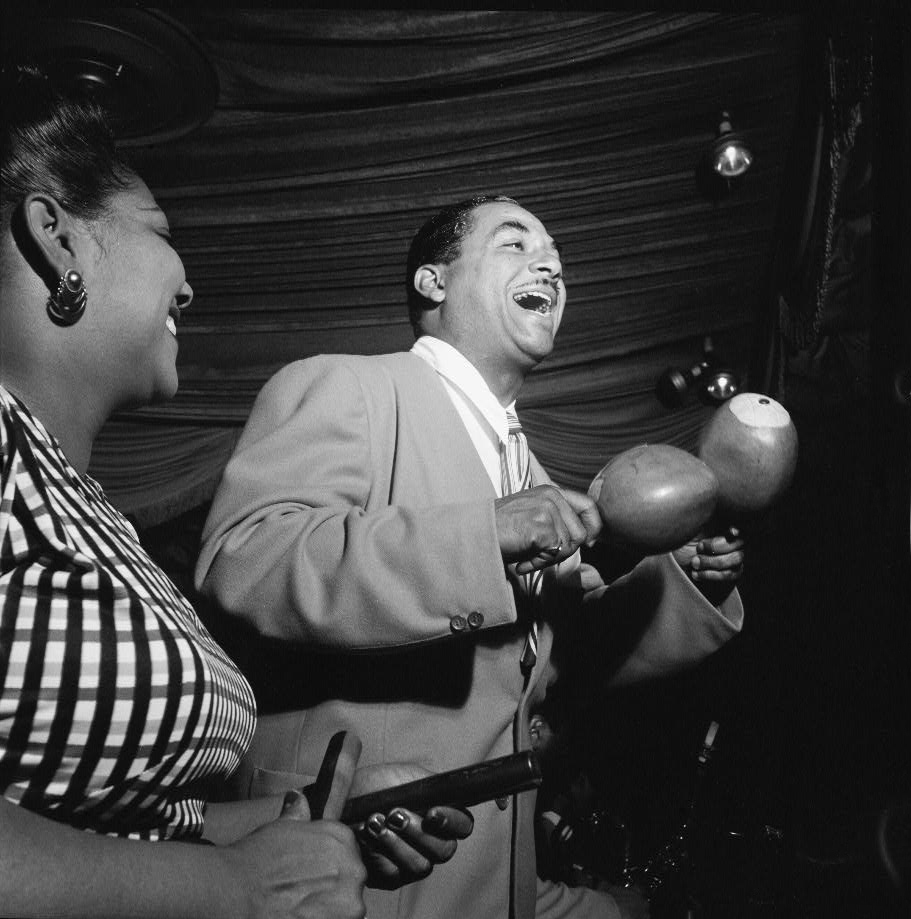
- Machito and Graciela performing at Glen Island Casino, New York, late 1940s

Background information
- Also known as: Frank Grillo
- Born: Francisco Raúl Gutiérrez Grillo c. December 3, 1909
- Origin: Havana, Cuba
- Died: April 15, 1984 (aged 74) London
- Genres: Latin jazz; Cubop
- Instruments: Singing; maracas
- Years active: 1928–1984
- Formerly of: Afro-Cubans

Frank Grillo (born Francisco Raúl Gutiérrez Grillo; December 3, 1909 – April 15, 1984) known professionally as Machito (previously as Macho), was a Latin jazz musician who helped refine Afro-Cuban jazz and played a key role in the creation of both Cubop and salsa music. He was raised in Havana with his foster sister, the singer Graciela.

In New York City, Machito formed the Afro-Cubans in 1940, and with Mario Bauzá as musical director, brought together Cuban rhythms and big band arrangements in one group. He made numerous recordings from the 1940s to the 1980s, many with Graciela as singer. Machito changed to a smaller ensemble format in 1975, touring Europe extensively. He brought his son and daughter into the band, and received a Grammy Award in 1983, one year before he died.

Machito's music had an effect on the careers of many musicians who played in the Afro-Cubans over the years, and on those who were attracted to Latin jazz after hearing him. George Shearing, Dizzy Gillespie, Charlie Parker, Cab Calloway and Stan Kenton credited Machito as an influence. An intersection in East Harlem is named "Machito Square" in his honor.

== Early life ==
Machito gave conflicting accounts of his birth. He sometimes said he was a native Cuban from Havana. Other accounts place his birth in Tampa, Florida, making him an American of Cuban ancestry. He may have been born in 1908 in the Jesús María district of Havana or in Tampa, 1909 in the Marianao Beach district of Havana or in Tampa, 1912 in Tampa or Havana, or even 1915 in Havana.

Regardless of his place of birth, Machito was fostered from an early age in the Jesús María district of Havana, where Graciela was born on August 23, 1915. Her parents raised both of them. Young Francisco Raúl Gutiérrez Grillo, the biological son of a cigar manufacturer, was nicknamed "Macho" as a child because he was the first son born to his parents after they had three daughters. In his teens and twenties in Cuba, "Macho" became a professional musician, playing in several ensembles from 1928 to 1937.

== Career ==
Macho moved to New York City in 1937 as a vocalist with Las Estrellas Habaneras (Havana Stars). He worked with several Latin artists and orchestras in the late 1930s, recording with Conjunto Moderno, Cuarteto Caney, Orchestra Siboney, and the bandleader Xavier Cugat. After an earlier attempt to launch a band with Mario Bauzá, in 1940 he founded the Afro-Cubans, and conducted their first rehearsal on December 3 at the Park Palace Ballroom located at W. 110th Street in Harlem. A big band-style brass section with trumpets and saxes was backed by a trap drum, piano, bass and a Cuban bongo. Several weeks later, in early January 1941, Machito took on Mario Bauzá as musical director; a role he retained for 34 years. As an instrumentalist, Bauza played trumpet and alto saxophone.

The band had an early hit with "Sopa de Pichon" in 1941. Its title is slang for "pigeon soup", a Puerto Rican joke about nearly starving as an immigrant in New York.

Machito and the Afro-Cubans, were among the first to fuse Afro-Cuban rhythms with jazz improvisation and arrangements for a big band. Machito was the front man and maraca player of the Afro Cubans, while Bauza determined the character of the band as musical director. Bauza, Machito's brother-in-law from his marriage to Machito's sister Estela, hired jazz-oriented arrangers and musicians to replace the band's founding member and original arranger, José "Pin" Madera, who had been drafted into the U.S. Military and served in World War II.

As a result, Machito's music greatly inspired such United States jazz musicians as Dizzy Gillespie, Charlie Parker and Stan Kenton. One of the items in the Kenton orchestra's repertoire was an idiomatic Afro-Cuban number known as "Machito", composed by Stan Kenton with Pete Rugolo and released as a Capitol 78 in 1947.

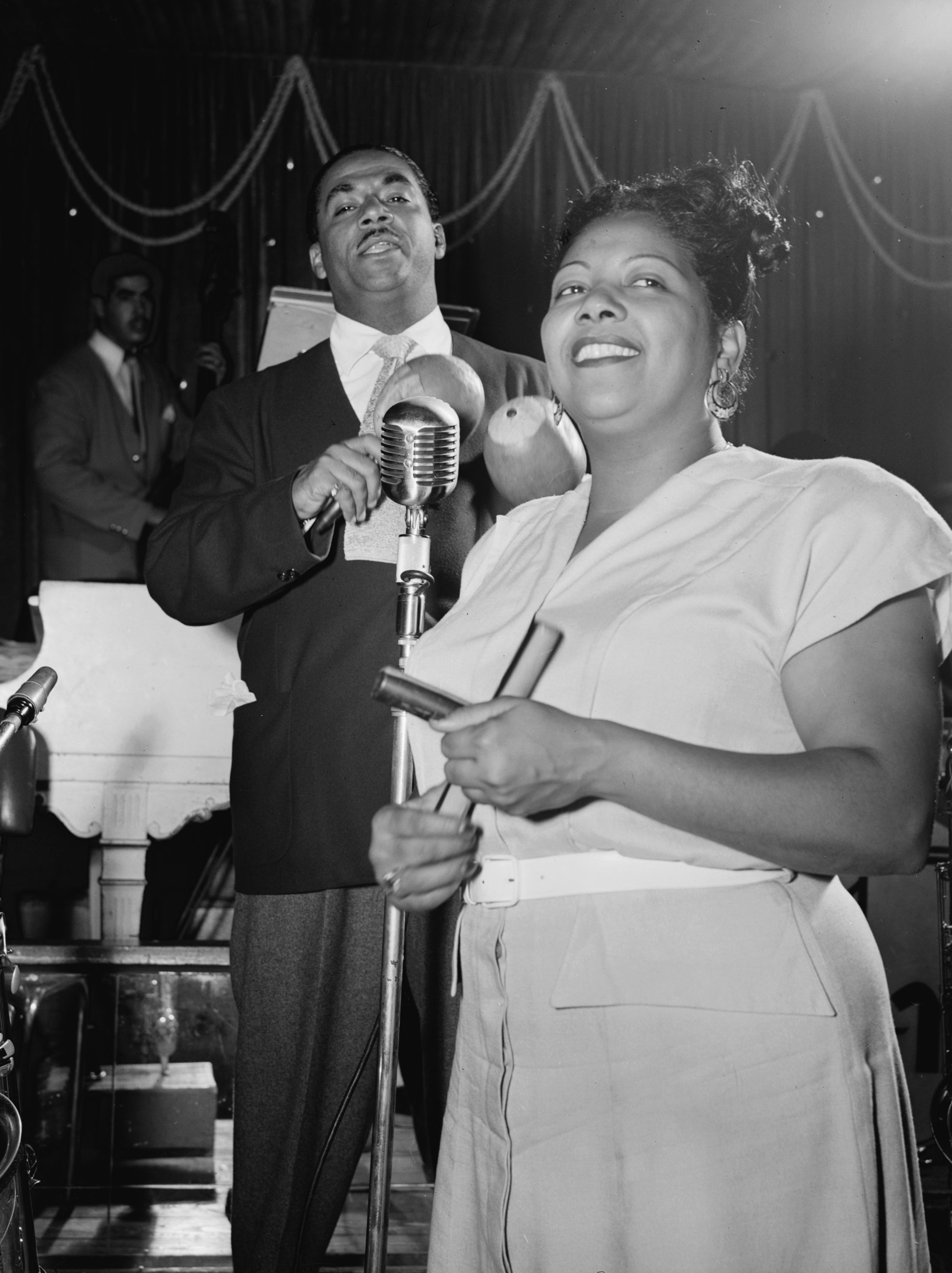
Machito and Graciela in 1947

In April 1943 during World War II, Machito was drafted into the United States Army. After a few months of training, he suffered a leg injury and was discharged in October. Earlier, anticipating a long absence of the band's leader, Bauza had sent for Machito's younger foster sister Graciela, who traveled to New York from Havana where she had been touring with El Trio Garcia, and singing lead with the all-female Orquesta Anacaona. Graciela served as the lead singer of the Afro-Cubans for a year before Machito returned to front the band. Graciela stayed on—at performances, the two singers alternated solo songs and created duets such as "Si Si No No" and "La Paella". Adding to the percussion, Graciela played claves alongside Machito's maracas.

Beginning in 1947, teenager Willie Bobo helped move the band's gear to gigs in Upper Manhattan, just so he could watch them play. Near the end of the evening, if there were no musician's union leaders in sight (he was underage), he borrowed bongos from José Mangual and played with the band. Later, Machito helped him get positions in other Latin bands. Many years later, George Shearing pointed to Machito and Willie Bobo as two musicians who helped him learn "what Latin music was about".

Machito accepted a recording date with Stan Kenton in December 1947, playing maracas on the tune "The Peanut Vendor", which was a hit for Kenton. Other members of the Afro-Cubans at the date were Carlos Vidal on congas and José Mangual on timbales. The next month, the bands of both Kenton and Machito shared the stage at The Town Hall, New York setting off a surging interest in Cubop. Machito named that style of music when he recorded an arrangement of Bauza's "Tanga" with the new title "Cubop City" in 1948. Machito was sought after by record producers, and in his live shows he featured soloists Howard McGhee on trumpet and Brew Moore on tenor sax. Late in 1948, he took to the studio with Charlie Parker, and Flip Phillips on tenor sax. Machito's star was ascendant, and he played Carnegie Hall on February 11, 1949, on a bill including Duke Ellington, Lester Young, Bud Powell and Coleman Hawkins. An album derived from 78 sides recorded in 1948 and 1949 was issued: Mucho Macho. For these recordings, the 14-piece band had three trumpeters (including Bauzá), four saxophonists, piano player René Hernández, a bass player, and three percussionists playing bongos, congas and timbales, augmented by Graciela on claves and Machito himself on maracas. A subsequent release was Tremendo Cumbán featuring arrangements by pianist Hernández and vocal additions from the Rigual Brothers. This recording includes Mitch Miller playing oboe on one tune, "Oboe Mambo".

Each summer from the mid-1940s to the late 1960s, a period of 22 years, Machito and his band played a ten-week engagement at the Concord Resort Hotel in the Catskills. Machito's album Vacation at the Concord was issued in 1958 as a representative experience of an evening's performance, but it was not recorded at the resort. Five-year-old Mario Grillo learned to play the timbales during the 1961 summer series, with lessons from Ubaldo Nieto, then returned to New York with his father's band and played his first gig, taking a single timbales solo at the Palladium Ballroom while standing on a chair next to Tito Puente.

In 1957, Machito recorded the album Kenya, with mostly original songs by A.K. Salim, or Hernández collaborating with Bauzá. The only cover tune was "Tin Tin Deo" by Luciano "Chano" Pozo. Guest musicians include Doc Cheatham and Joe Newman on trumpet, Cannonball Adderley on alto sax, and Eddie Bert on trombone. Band regular and arranger band Ray Santos played tenor sax on the album as well. A seven-man percussion section (including Cándido Camero and Carlos "Patato" Valdés) rounds it out. The album has shown significant longevity: a half century after its release it was named by Robert Dimery in his book 1001 Albums You Must Hear Before You Die.

=== Smaller format ===
In 1975, Machito's son Mario Grillo, known as "Machito Jr", joined the band for its recording with Dizzy Gillespie, Afro-Cuban Jazz Moods; the album, featuring arrangements by Chico O'Farrill, was nominated for a Grammy Award. Later in 1975, Machito determined that he would accept an invitation to tour Europe with a smaller eight-piece ensemble. Bauzá quit; he had grave doubts that such an enterprise would work musically. Graciela left as well. The tour and the smaller band proved very successful; the start of perennial tours of Europe. (Bauzá admitted, years later, that he had acted too hastily.) Mario Grillo took over the duties of musical director in 1977. That year, the band earned another Grammy nomination for Fireworks—a change of tone signaled by the appearance of Lalo Rodríguez as co-lead singer and composer of three tunes. Further European tours were undertaken using the band name "Machito and his Salsa Big Band", and Machito's daughter Paula Grillo carried female lead vocals, stepping into Graciela's shoes. When the band appeared in London in February 1982, they accepted long-term engagements, making London their "home base".

At Avery Fisher Hall in 1978, Machito and his band played for the New York portion of the Newport Jazz Festival. Dizzy Gillespie soloed with the band. Following his set, Machito and Tito Puente both brought their bands to the stage. The two bands played the song "Mamba Adonis" for 15 minutes, a tune that was later renamed "Machito Forever" by Puente. Subsequently, Machito's band and Gillespie finished the set with the tune "Manteca", an arrangement from 1948.

In 1983, Machito won a Grammy Award in the Best Latin Recording category for Machito & His Salsa Big Band '82. The recording was made in the Netherlands in about four hours, mostly one take per tune.

== Personal life ==
Machito was somewhat short in stature, at 5 feet 4 inches (1.63 m) in height. A lifelong Roman Catholic, he married Puerto Rican Hilda Torres on January 17, 1940, at which time he changed his nickname from "Macho" to "Machito". The cross-national marriage served as a sign to New York Latinos that it was possible to attain a sense of pan-Latino brotherhood. Frank and Hilda Grillo produced five children: Martha (1941), Frank Jr (1943), Barbara (1948), Mario (1956) and Paula. The family lived in Spanish Harlem at 112th Street and Second Avenue, where Machito enjoyed cooking for his children, writing the occasional song such as "Sopa de Pichón" while working in the kitchen.

Machito suffered a stroke before a concert in London, England in 1984, collapsing while waiting to go on stage at Ronnie Scott's club. He died four days later on April 19, 1984, at University College Hospital in London. His son Mario carried forward the legacy by leading the Machito Orchestra after his father's death. His daughter Paula, though dedicating her life to scholarly studies, has occasionally fronted the group as its singer.

Mario Bauzá died in 1993. Hilda Grillo, a patron of Latin music after her husband's death, died in July 1997. Having never married, Graciela died in April 2010 at the age of 94.

== Legacy ==
In 1985, New York mayor Ed Koch named the intersection of East 111th Street and Third Avenue "Machito Square", a location in Spanish Harlem which is one block from East 110th Street, renamed "Tito Puente Way" after the 2000 death of Tito Puente. Machito lived as a young adult in an apartment on the southwest corner of the intersection.

A documentary film by Isabelle Leymarie and Carlos Ortiz (Leymarie’s name was unduly left out of the credits by Ortiz), Machito: A Latin Jazz Legacy, was released in 1987, showing an elderly Machito and his wife in their Bronx apartment, as well as archival footage from performances in the 1940s and afterward.

== Selected discography ==
=== As leader ===
- Mucho Macho Machito (Clef, 1948–1949; Pablo, 1978) 2-LP compilation
- Kenya (Roulette, 1957)
- Vacation at the Concord (Verve, 1958)
- Machito with Flute to Boot (Roulette, 1959)
- Machito at the Crescendo (GNP Crescendo, 1961)
- Soul Source (VSP, 1966)
- Fireworks with Lalo Rodriguez (Coco Records, 1977)
- Machito and his Salsa Big Band 1982 (Timeless, 1983)
- Live at North Sea '82 (Timeless, 1983)
- Machito!!! (Timeless, 1983)

=== As sideman ===
- Miguelito Valdés, Bim Bam Boom – An Album of Cuban Rhythms (Decca, 1946; Decca [10"], 1949)
- Miguelito Valdés, Afro-Cuban Music (Decca, 1947; Decca [10"], 1951)
- Charlie Parker, South of the Border (Mercury/Clef/Verve, 1948 and 1951–1952)
- Miguelito Valdés, Cuban Nights (Decca, 1958)
- Miguelito Valdés, Reunion (Tico, 1963)
- Miguelito Valdés, Los Reyes Del Ritmo (The Kings Of Rhythm) (Decca, 1964)
- Dizzy Gillespie, Afro-Cuban Jazz Moods (Pablo, 1975)

== See also ==
- List of jazz arrangers

== Bibliography ==
- Austerlitz, Paul and Jere Laukkanen (2016). Machito and His Afro-Cubans: Selected Transcriptions. Middleton, WI: A & R Edition. ISBN 9780895798282.
- Leymarie, Isabelle (2002). Cuban Fire: The Story of Salsa and Latin Jazz. New York: Continuum. ISBN 978-0826455864.
