= Afro-Cubans (band) =

Latin jazz band

The Afro-Cubans were a Latin jazz band founded by Machito in 1940; often billed as Machito and his Afro-Cubans. Their musical director was Mario Bauzá, Machito's brother-in-law.

The Afro-Cubans combined Cuban music with orchestrations derived from swing. As well, the Afro-Cubans played with and incorporated the music of many figures in jazz, including Charlie Parker, Dizzy Gillespie, Flip Phillips, and Buddy Rich; but the association went both ways, as the Latin rhythms of the Afro-Cubans strongly influenced the jazz scene in New York.

After making some early 78s for Decca, the Afro-Cubans came to increased prominence towards the end of World War II, appearing with Stan Kenton's orchestra. (Machito played maracas on Kenton's recordings of "The Peanut Vendor" and "Cuban Carnival") and recorded for Mercury and Clef. On Bauzá's urging, Machito's band featured American jazz soloists on its recordings from 1948 to 1960, including Howard McGhee, Harry "Sweets" Edison, Cannonball Adderley, Herbie Mann, Curtis Fuller and Johnny Griffin and those previously mentioned (Parker featured on "No Noise"). Playing regularly at New York's Palladium, Machito's band had its highest reach during the mambo craze of the 1950s, survived the upheavals of the 1960s and despite the loss of Bauzá in 1976, continued to work frequently. The band recorded for Pablo (in tandem with Gillespie) and Timeless in its later years.
