= Mambo (dance) =

Latin dance of Cuba

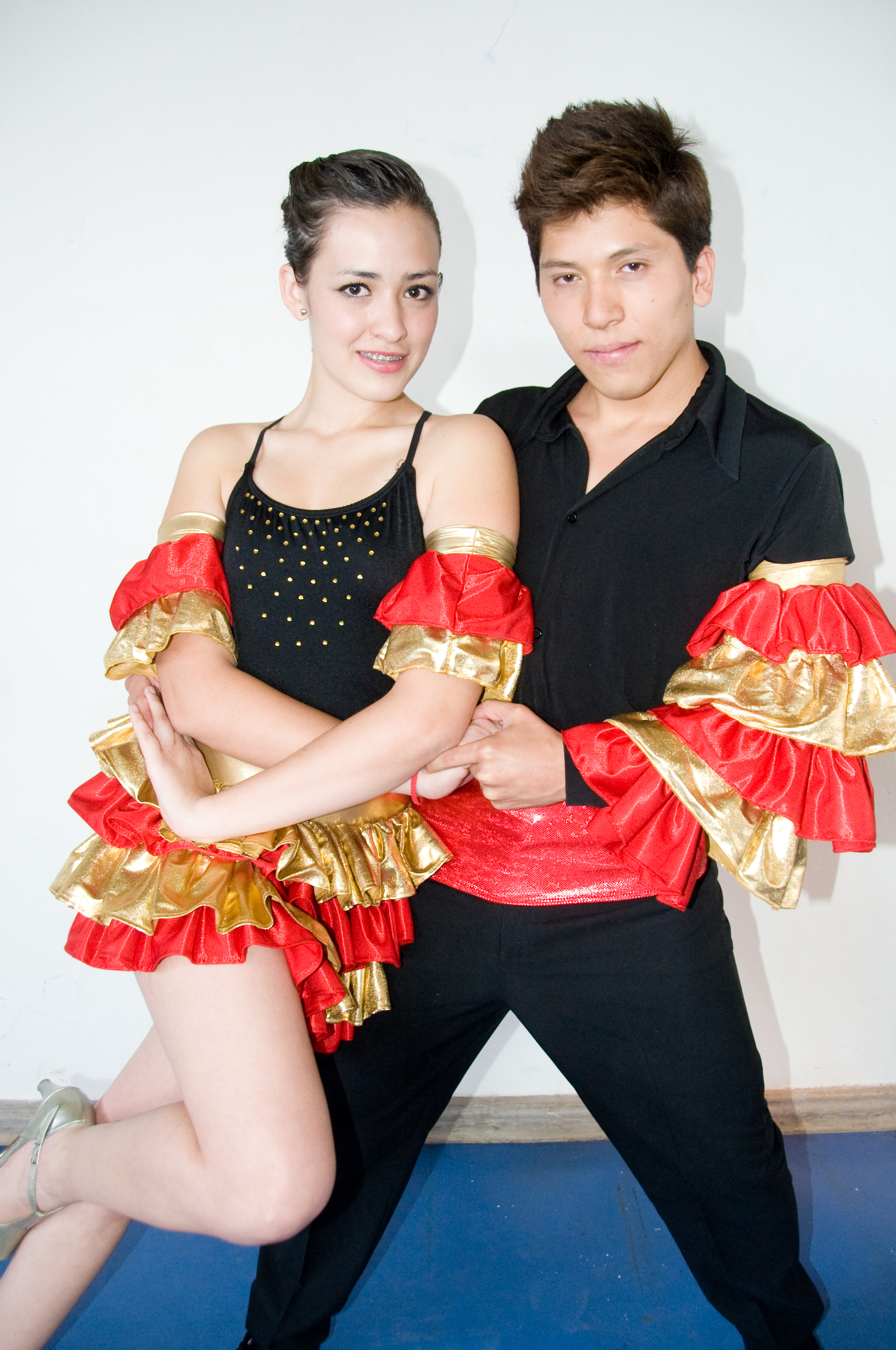
Mambo dancers at the ITESM Campus Ciudad de Mexico

Mambo is a Latin dance of Cuba which was developed in the 1940s when the music genre of the same name became popular throughout Latin America. The original ballroom dance which emerged in Cuba and Mexico was related to the danzón, albeit faster and less rigid. In the United States, it replaced rhumba as the most fashionable Latin dance. Later on, with the advent of salsa and its more sophisticated dance, a new type of mambo dance including breaking steps was popularized in New York. This form received the name of "salsa on 2", "mambo on 2" or "modern mambo".

== History ==
=== Origins ===
In the mid-1940s, bandleaders devised a dance for a new form of music known as mambo, taking its name from the 1938 song Mambo, a charanga composed by Orestes Lopez which had popularized a new form of danzon which later was known as danzon mambo. This style was a syncopated, less rigid form of the danzón which allowed the dancers to more freely express themselves during the last section, known as the mambo section.

From Havana Pérez Prado moved his music to Mexico, where his music and the dance were adopted. The original mambo dance was characterized by freedom and complicated foot-steps. This style was prominent in the Rumberas films. Popular dancers of the era include Ninon Sevilla, Maria Antonieta Pons, Tongolele, Meche Barba, and Resortes.

=== Americanisation ===
The mambo dance that was spearheaded by Pérez Prado and was popular in the 1940s and 1950s in Cuba, Mexico, and New York is completely different from the modern dance that New Yorkers now call "mambo" and which is also known as salsa "on 2". The original mambo dance contains no breaking steps or basic steps at all. The Cuban dance was not accepted by many professional dance teachers. Cuban dancers would describe mambo as "feeling the music", in which sound and movement were merged through the body. Professional dance teachers in the US saw this approach to dancing as "extreme", "undisciplined", and thus deemed it necessary to standardize the dance to present it as a salable commodity for the social and ballroom market.

In the 1940s, Puerto Rican dancer Pedro Aguilar, known as "Cuban Pete", and his wife became popular as the top mambo dancers of the time, dancing regularly at The Palladium in NY. "Cuban Pete" was named "the greatest Mambo dancer ever" by Life magazine and the legendary Tito Puente. Pedro Aguilar was also nicknamed el cuchillo ("The knife") for his mambo dance style.

The modern mambo dance from New York was popularized in the late 1960s into the 1970s by George Vascones, president of a dance group known as the Latin Symbolics, from the Bronx, New York. George Vascones continued the mambo dance tradition which started two decades earlier during the "Palladium era". It was followed in the 1980s by Eddie Torres, Angel Rodriguez of RazzM'Tazz Mambo Dance Company, and others, many of whom were 2nd generation New York Puerto Ricans. This style is sometimes danced to mambo music, but more often to salsa dura (old-school salsa). It is termed "mambo on 2" because the break, or direction change, in the basic step occurs on count 2. The Eddie Torres and Razz M'Tazz schools each have different basic steps, even though they share this same basic feature. Eddie Torres describes his version as a "street" style he developed out of what he saw on the Bronx streets. The RazzM'Tazz version is closer to the Palladium Mambo (from the Palladium ballroom in the 1950s), whose basic step was in turn derived from Cuban son, with which it shares its timing (234 - 678, with pauses on 1 and 5) both styles derived from the American Mambo with the freestyle steps based on jazz and tap steps.

== See also ==
- Mambo (music)
- Dirty Dancing
