= Afro-Caribbean music =

Genre of music

- Stylistic origins: African music, Latin American music, European music
- Cultural origins: African diaspora, transatlantic slave trade
- Typical instruments: cuatro guitar, tres guitar, guitarrón, agogō, güiro, cabasa, maracas, claves, congas, bongos, bombo, batá

Subgenres
- Biguine, son cubano, salsa, calypso, soca, mento, reggae, ska, merengue, mereng, Zouk, Compas

Regional scenes
- Caribbean, United States

Local scenes
- Bahamas, Barbados, Belize, Colombia, Cuba, Dominica, Dominican Republic, Guadeloupe, Guyana, Haiti, Jamaica, Martinique, Montserrat, Panama, Puerto Rico, Suriname, Trinidad and Tobago, Venezuela

Afro-Caribbean music is a broad term for music styles originating in the Caribbean from the African diaspora. These types of music usually have West African/Central African influence because of the presence and history of African people and their descendants living in the Caribbean, as a result of the trans-Atlantic slave trade. These distinctive musical art forms came about from the cultural mingling of African, Indigenous, and European inhabitants. Characteristically, Afro-Caribbean music incorporates components, instruments and influences from a variety of African cultures, as well as Indigenous and European cultures.

Afro-Caribbean music has been influenced by historical and stylistic influences. Historically, Afro-Caribbean music was influenced by the transatlantic slave trade and later, by the resistance and emancipation of slaves. Stylistically, afro-Caribbean music has been influenced by various African, European and Indigenous Latin American influences. African influences are reflected by many of the Rhythms, vocal characteristics and instruments that are used in afro-Caribbean music. Afro-Caribbean music shares many commonalities with traditional European style music, using many European instruments, harmonies and melodies in music of the genre. Indigenous Latin American influence can be seen through the use of percussive instruments and certain vocal techniques. Afro-Caribbean music has many common musical characteristics, including the use of Polyrhythms, call-and-response invocations and a variety of instruments. Instruments commonly used in afro-Caribbean music include drums, other percussion instruments, and guitars.

Although the roots of afro-Caribbean music go back to the 15th century, the official local industry only began in the 1920s. Following this, afro-Caribbean music gained global popularity throughout the 20th century. As afro-Caribbean music gained popularity, many sub-genres began to emerge. These sub-genres include: son cubano, salsa, calypso, soca, mento, ska, reggae and merengue.

== Development of the industry ==
=== Local Caribbean ===
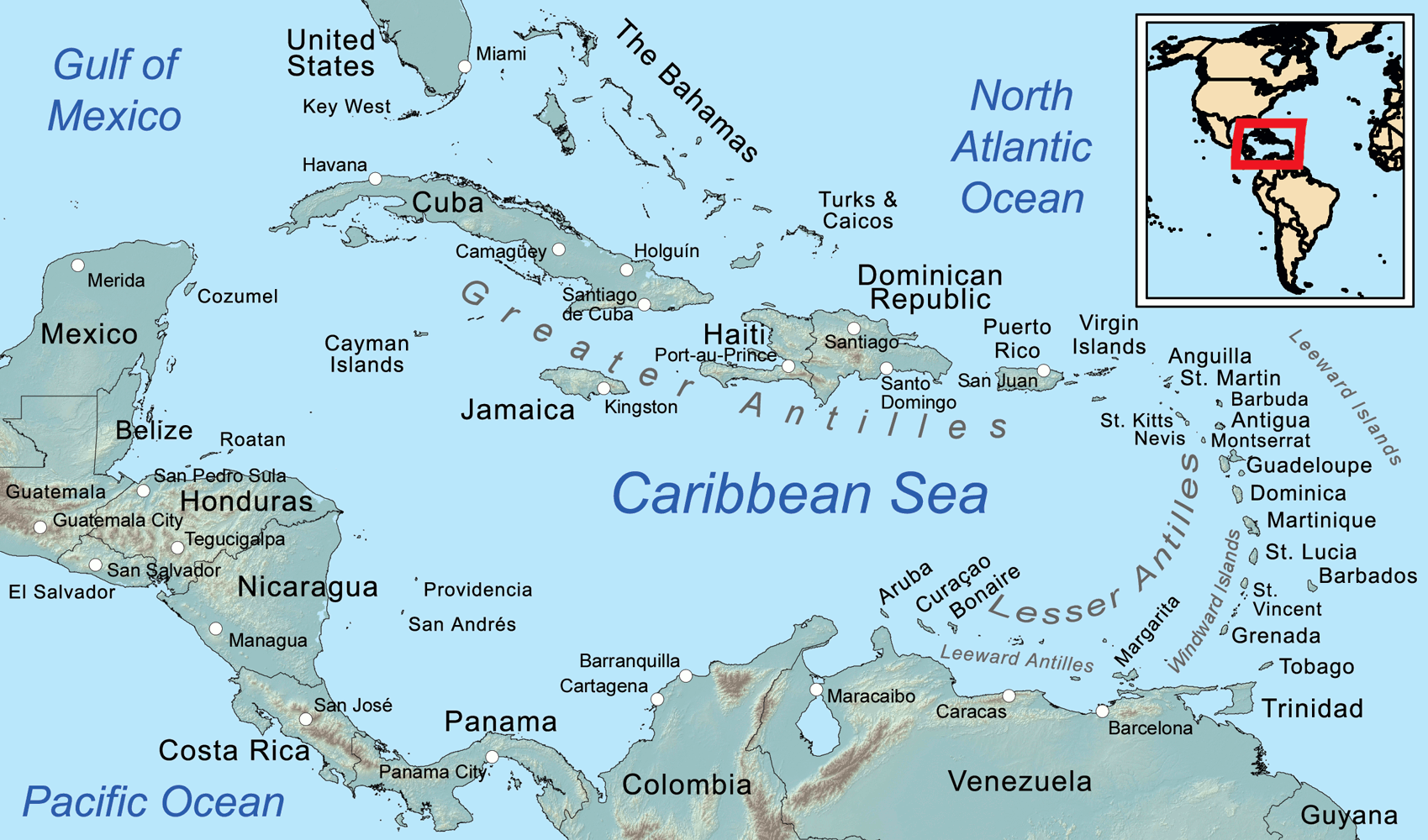
Map showing the Caribbean islands and sea in respect to the rest of the world

Afro-Caribbean music began in the Caribbean as a result of the transatlantic slave trade and the creation of a neo-African culture among slaves. Afro-Caribbean music dates back as far as the 15th century, when the slave trade began. Although afro-Caribbean music existed for centuries, local recording and distribution officially began in the 1920s. Some of the earlier afro-Caribbean sub-genres to emerge included calypso, merengue, son, reggae and salsa. Due to multiple problems with production and distribution, music from the region struggled initially to gain global popularity.

=== Global popularity ===
Afro-Caribbean music rose to popularity during the 20th century, exerting influence over many subsequent genres including jazz and hip-hop. Many of these sub-genres have been validated in recent years due to a newfound appreciation of afro-Caribbean culture and tradition. In the United States, the genre has gained popularity due to the mass media infrastructure, large immigrant population and receptive non-Caribbean audiences. Due to these factors, New York City, although not in the Caribbean, is considered another centre of afro-Caribbean music. Sub-genres that gained popularity in the United States include the rumba, salsa and reggae. These genres were particularly popular among youth during the 1970s in countries such as the United States and the United Kingdom.

== Influences of afro-Caribbean music ==
=== Historical influences ===
==== Role of the transatlantic slave trade ====
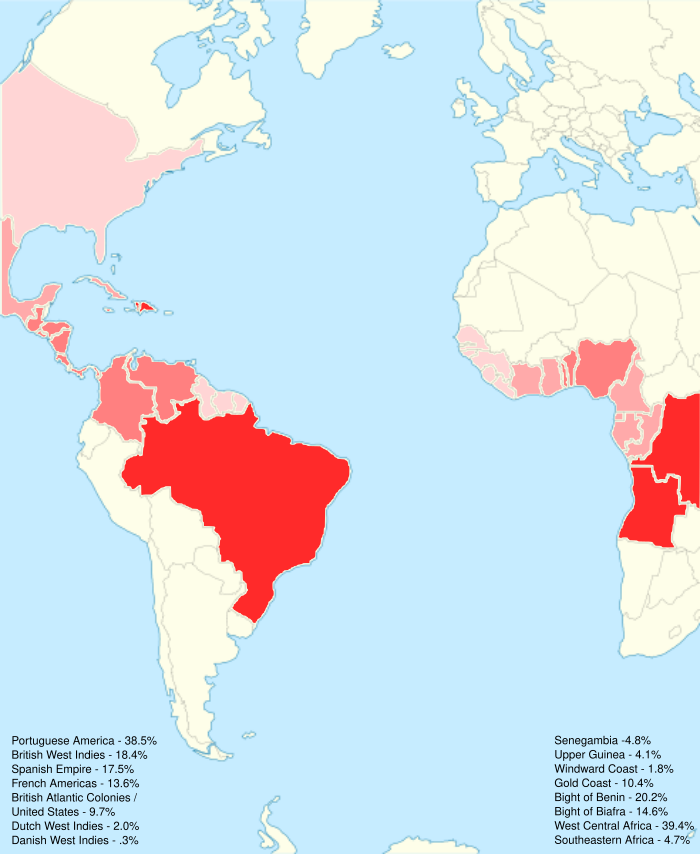
Map of the Atlantic Ocean depicting the regions of Africa where slaves were taken from and the regions of the Americas where they were sent to work

The origin of afro-Caribbean music traces back to the 15th century and the arrival of African people in the Caribbean via the transatlantic slave trade. During the slave era, rivalling African villages attained captives who were sold into the slave trade. The collaboration of African states with European slave traders stimulated the slave trade, eliminating the need for kidnapping or effort by the European slavers. There were many different African cultures and traditions present among the Caribbean slave population. Music, tradition and religion were important to African people. As a result, neo-African cultures began to form among slaves from different parts of Africa, combining elements from a variety of African cultures. The creation of a neo-African cultures among slaves allowed for the creation of new communities and the development of slave resistance. Music was an important factor in the recreation of community among slaves, leading to the creation of afro-Caribbean music.

==== Role of emancipation ====
The Haitian Revolution saw the end of slavery in Haiti at the end of the 18th century. This effectively saw Haiti as the first nation in the world to abolish slavery. Following the Haitian revolution, Britain concluded the importation of slaves in 1807 and began the process of abolition in 1823. The abolition of slavery in Britain was said to be complete in 1838. Although the slave trade was abolished in Britain in the early 19th century, the slave trade continued via the Iberian Peninsula until as late as 1873. Due to this, approximately 135 000 slaves continued to be traded annually between 1800 and 1850. The abolition of slavery restricted afro-Caribbean music in one way as it led to a decreased number of slaves arriving from Africa and a weakened link between African people living in the Caribbean and their homeland. At the same time the abolition of slavery opened the door for previously enslaved Africans to participate more freely in music again, leading to further development of afro-Caribbean music.

=== Stylistic influences ===
Afro-Caribbean music is characterised by the combined influence of African, European and indigenous Caribbean cultures.

==== African music ====
Many rhythms, song styles and vocal characteristics used in afro-Caribbean music are reflective of traditional African music. Examples of African vocal characteristics include call-and-response invocations and textually repetitious, simple lyrics. Afro-Caribbean music places a strong emphasis on rhythm, or a series of repeated pulses, this is also reflective of the influence of African music. Dominant African influences include those from the Bantu, Kongo, Fon and Yoruba peoples. This is largely reflective of the fact that many slaves were from Western or Central Africa due to their proximity to the Atlantic seaboard.

==== European music ====
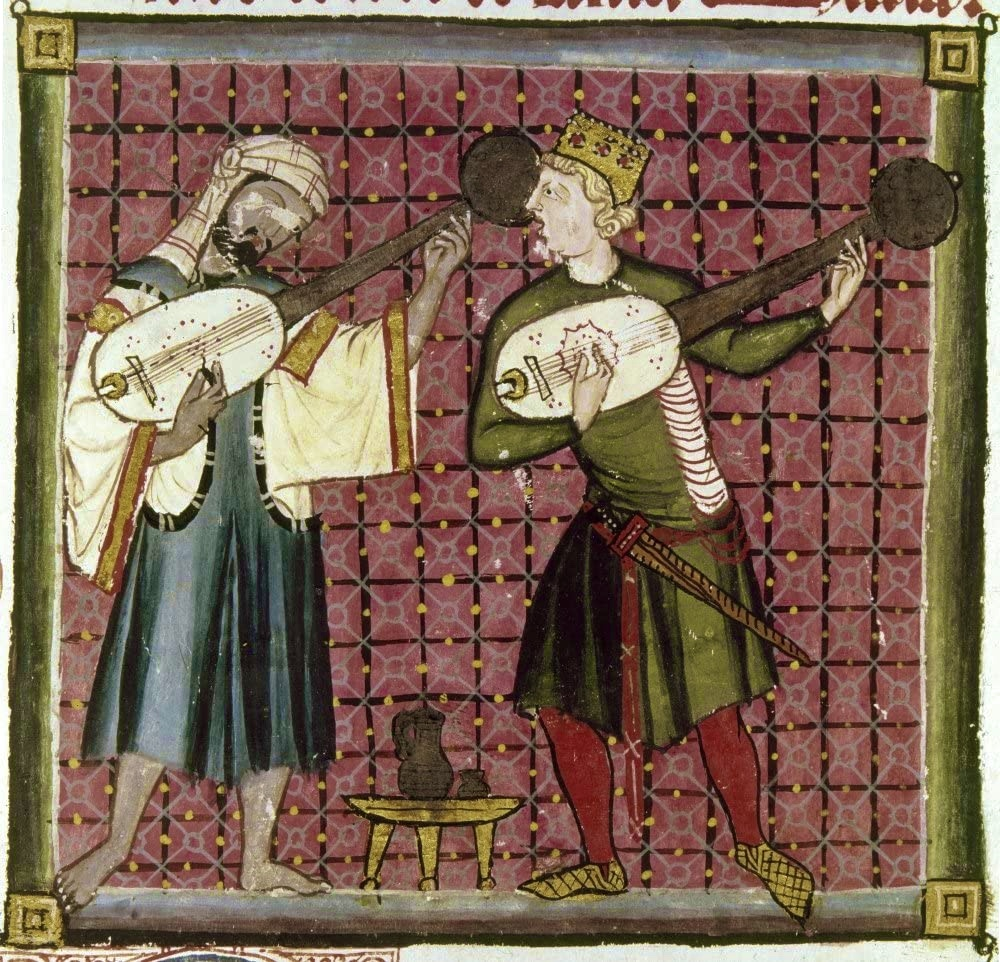
Musicians from Maghreb and Europe playing string instruments, illustration by an anonymous artist in 13th century Spain

The European influence seen in afro-Caribbean music stems from music that was popular in the colonial era such as classical, folk and dance music. Popular dance music at the time included the contradance and quadrille. Elements of the contradance have been incorporated into afro-Caribbean sub-genres such as the Merengue. Due to the large numbers of Spanish settlers compared to English settlers in Caribbean colonies, the European influence on afro-Caribbean music is more strongly Spanish. Examples of European influence in afro-Caribbean music include the presence of tonal harmonies, melodies and instruments of European origin. The lyrics of afro-Caribbean music are most commonly in European languages such as Spanish, English or French. The presence of European instruments and elements in afro-Caribbean music is reflective of the European music that slaves were forced to play for their masters. Over time, African elements, such as percussion and call-and-response invocations, were combined with traditional European elements. This led to the creation of a new hybrid genre, afro-Caribbean music.

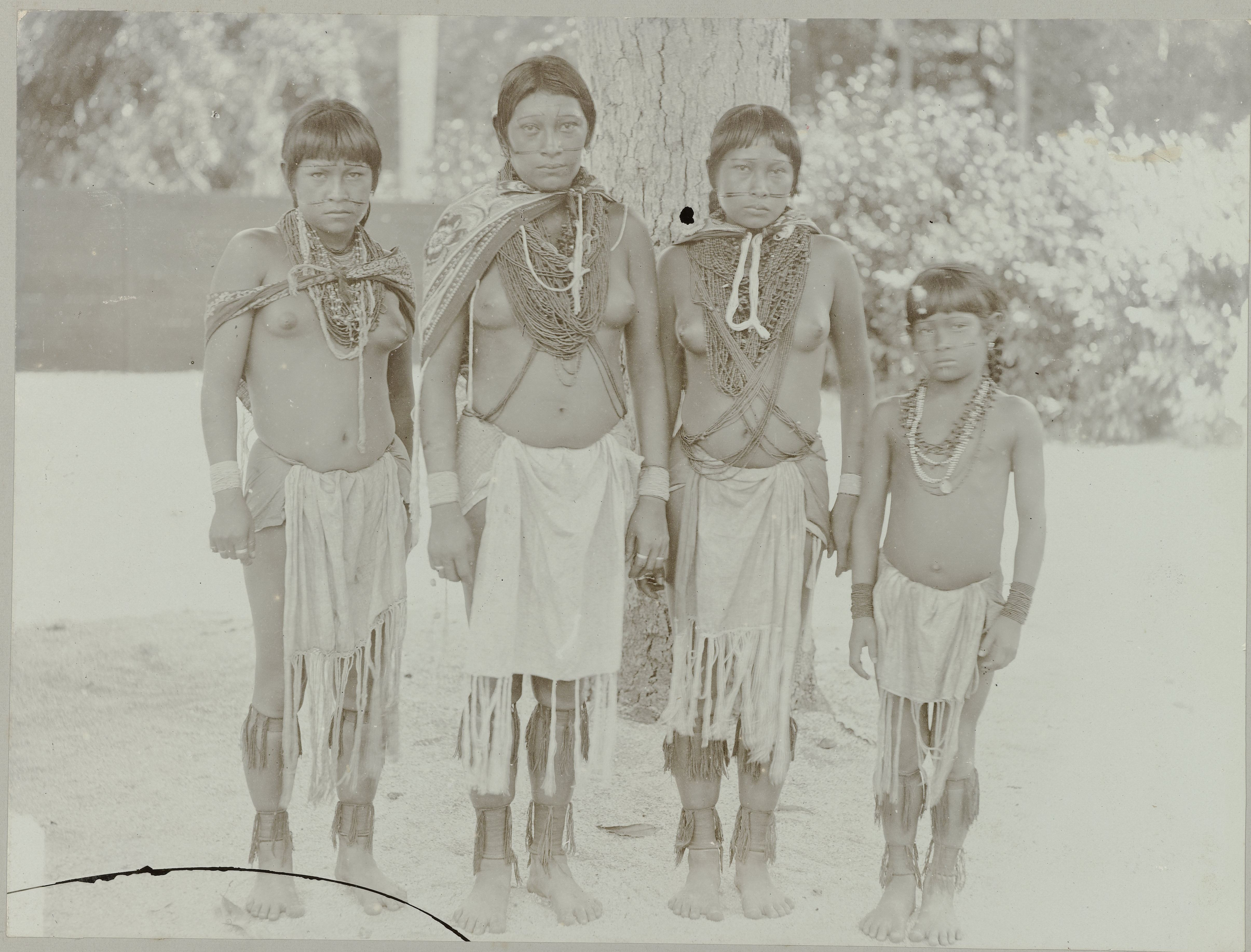
Four native Caribbean women from Suriname pose in the garden of the Government House in Paramaribo

==== Indigenous Caribbean and American music ====
Afro-Caribbean music was influenced by the ceremonial-style, religious music of the native American people (including indigenous Caribbean people). Traditional elements such as call-and-response style singing and the use of percussive instruments (such as Güiros and Maracas) are reflected in afro-Caribbean music.

== Musical characteristics ==
=== Components ===
Example of a polyrhythm

==== Polyrhythms ====
The combination of multiple series of pulses is referred to as a polyrhythm. These rhythms are often created using drums such as the batá. This rhythm is used as a base, to which vocals and other instruments can be added to. The Polyrhythm pattern is common in music derived from Western and Central Africa. In afro-Caribbean music, the polyrhythm is mainly seen in the music derived from Cuba and Haiti.

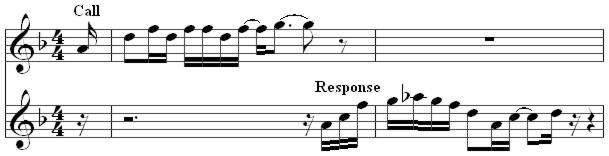
Example of musical notes for a call-and-response invocation

==== Call-and-response invocations ====
Call-and-response invocations refer to a vocal technique where one phrase is sung by a member of the group and then it is answered by another member, who sings a complimentary phrase. This technique was brought to the Caribbean by slaves that came from Western and Central Africa. Call-and-response invocations are used throughout the afro-Caribbean music genre, and particularly in the music derived from Cuba.

Example of a cinquillo rhythm

==== Cinquillo rhythm ====
The cinquillo is a rhythmic pattern that is used in afro-Caribbean music. This rhythmic cell originated in sub-Saharan Africa and was brought to the Caribbean by enslaved people of Bantu origin. Once arriving in the Caribbean, the cinquillo beat was transformed and refined, in countries such as Haiti and Cuba, to fit the evolving afro-Caribbean music genre. The cinquillo is created by use of percussion instruments such as the claves and güiro.

=== Instruments ===
==== Drums ====
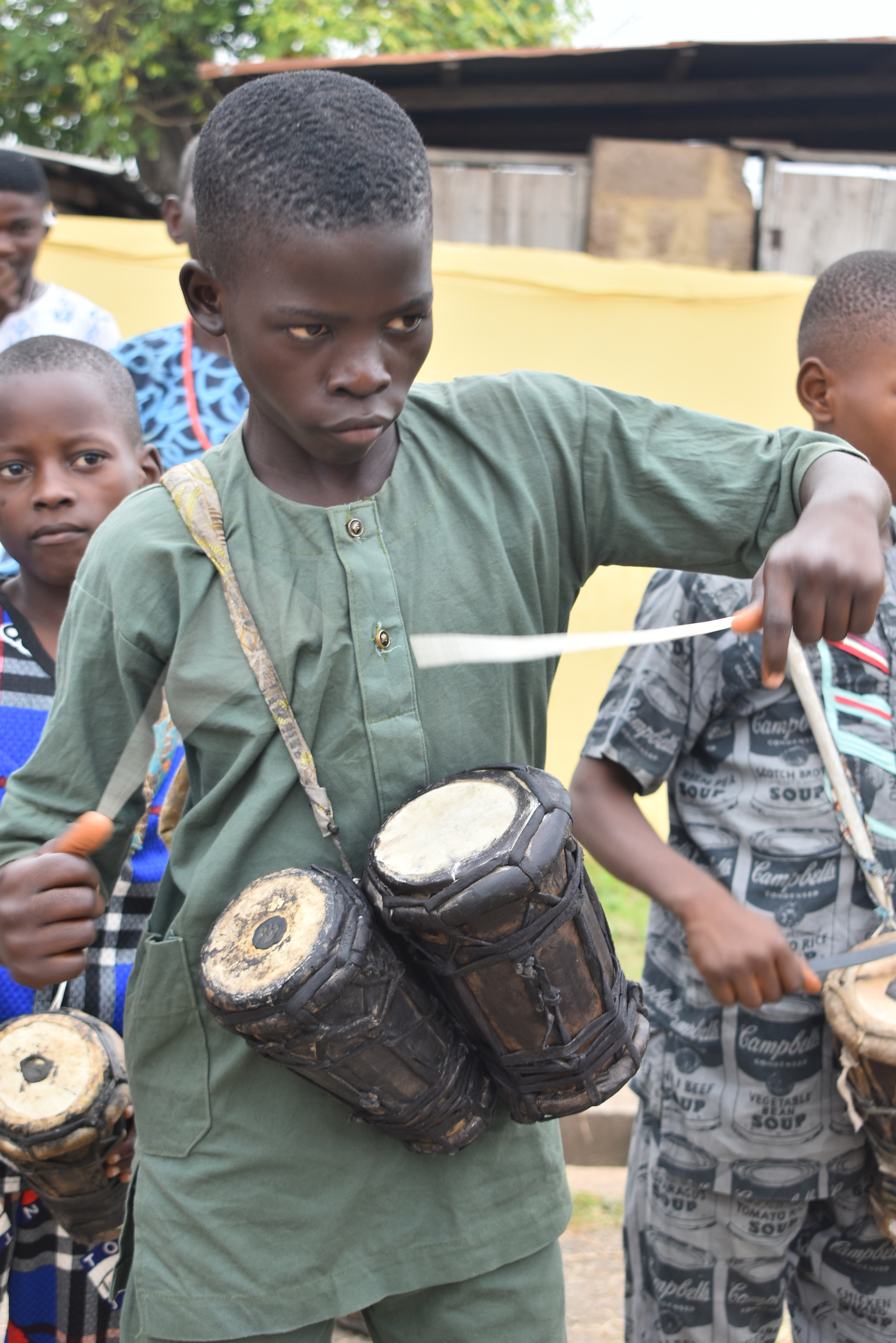
African child playing the batá drums

Drums are an important element of afro-Caribbean music, culture and religion. Drums are used in many Rituals and ceremonies such as the Haitian vodun ceremony. During the slave era, this strong link of drums with culture, religion and solidarity was recognised by white oppressors and drumming was subsequently banned in an attempt to curtail potential rebellions.

Congas, bongos, bombo and batá drums are most commonly heard in afro-Caribbean music, however, many other variations of drums are also used including the tumba francesa, palo, yuka and makuta drums. The influence of the drums in afro-Caribbean music is mixed with many popular drum varieties originating in Latin America, Europe and Africa. In most circumstances the roots of these drum types lead back to African origin. A prominent drumming influence from Africa is the use of the hands to create music over a variety of Timbres, unlike in European music, where sticks are favoured to strike the drums.

===== Batá =====
Main article: batá drum

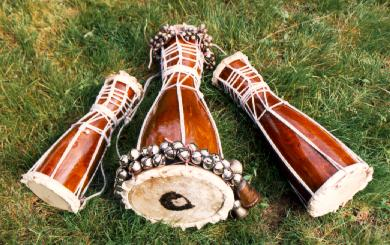
Three types of batá drums (from left: Okónkolo, Iyá, Itótele)

Batá drums have an hourglass shape with a drumhead at either end. Traditionally, a batá drum would consist of a wooden base with drumheads made of skin, pulled taut, at each end.Batá drums are available in a variety of sizes, each with a different purpose in creating overall rhythm and sound. Sound is produced by the individual striking the drumheads on each side with their hands. This particular variety of drum originated in Nigeria among the Yoruba people and was once an instrument used for religious purposes to worship the African Orishas. The batá drums are now widely used in Latin American and afro-Caribbean music.

===== Bombo =====
Main article: bombo drum

The bombo drum (also known as the bombo criollo) is another drum commonly seen in afro-Caribbean music. This drum is of South American origin and is commonly used in indigenous music of the region. The bombo drum is composed of a large, hollow wooden drum with an animal skin for the drumhead. Sound is produced on the bombo drum by striking the middle of the drumhead with the hand and by striking the rim of the drumhead with a small stick or other tool.

===== Congas and bongos =====
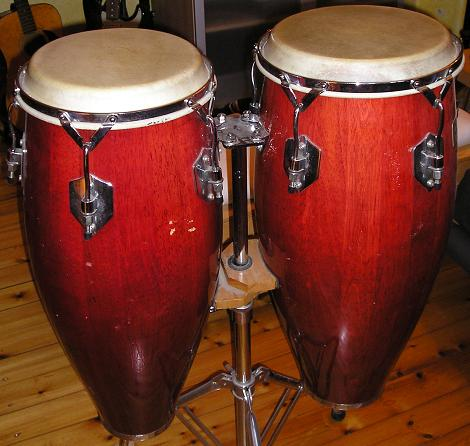
Pair of conga drums

Main articles: Conga drum, bongo drum

Congas are tall, barrel-like, single-headed drums, usually played using the hands. Bongos are similar to congas in shape, however, they are smaller and commonly played in pairs. Bongos are tapered, single headed drums that are usually composed of a wooden base with an animal hide drumhead. There are two variations of bongo drums that produce different pitches. The macho bongo produces a high pitch, popping like sound and is referred to as the male bongo. In contrast, the hembra bongo is considered the female of the pair and produces low, deep sounds. The congas and bongos originated in Cuba among African slaves and are key instruments of the afro-Caribbean music genre. These drums are reminiscent of other African style drums that inspired them such as the batá, yuka and makuta drums.

==== Hand-held percussion ====
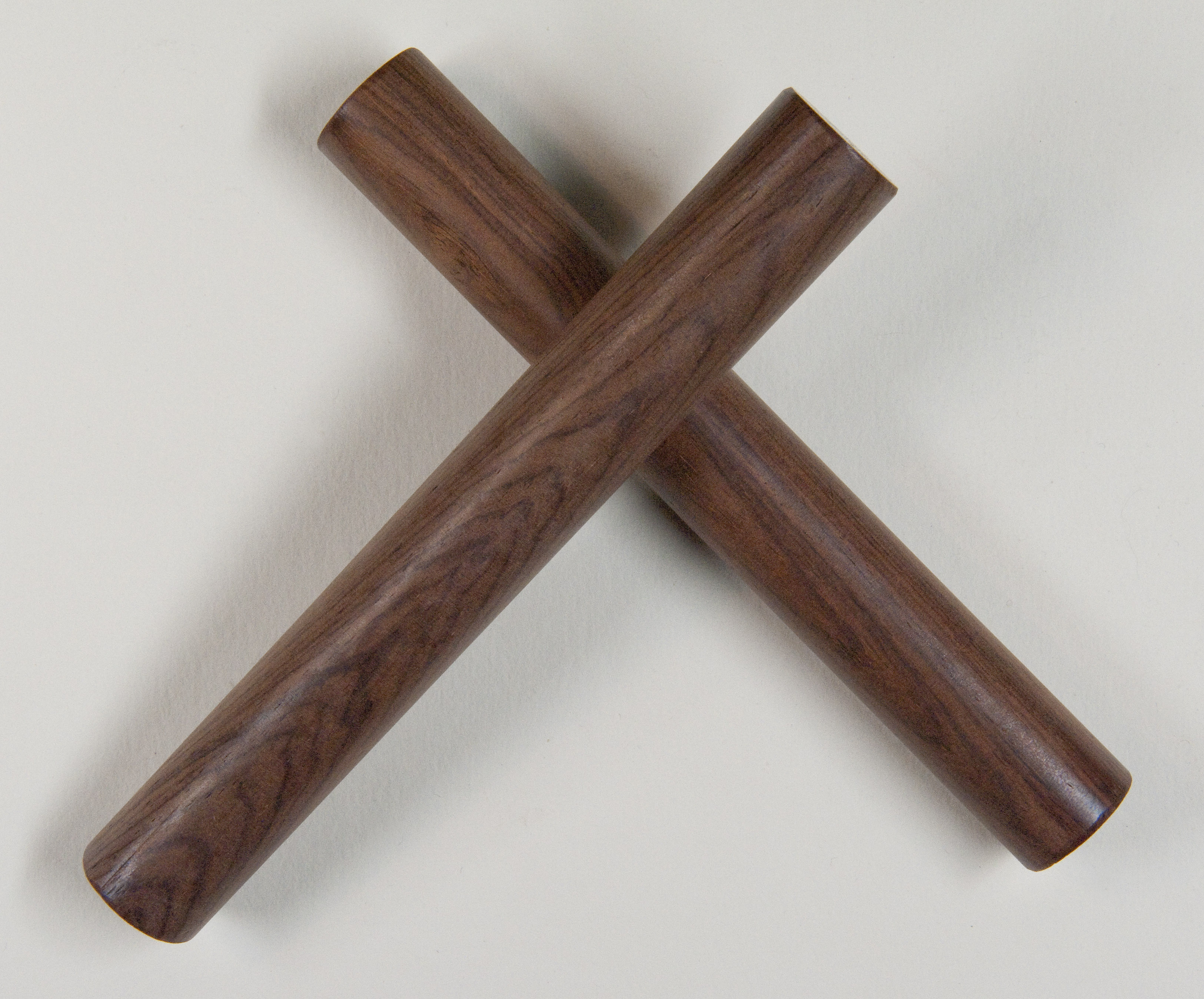
Wooden claves

===== Claves =====
Main article: claves

Claves (also called palitos) consist of two short, round pieces of wood which are struck together to produce sound. Modern day claves originated in Cuba and are reminiscent of early percussive instruments present in ancient, indigenous civilisations all around the world, including Africa and South America. Claves are used to maintain a rhythm known as the ‘clave’, or the key.

===== Maracas =====
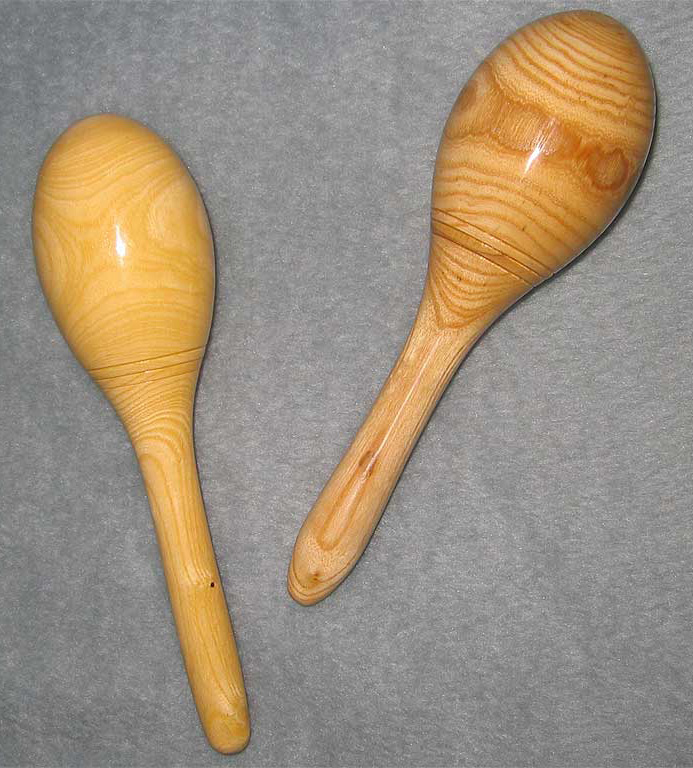
Maracas

Main article: Maracas

Maracas (also called boîte à de clous, caraxa, mussamba) are handheld rattles consisting of a hollow vessel (such as a Gourds or Turtle shells), filled with small items (such as Seeds, nuts or shells), attached to a handle. The Maraca is shaken to produce a rattle sound which is used to maintain tempo and rhythm. Different versions of maracas originated in South America and Africa. They were often played to accompany dancers and other musicians. Variations of maracas include versions that are worn on the wrist and versions in different shapes of sticks, hourglasses, cones or crosses. Maracas are used in many afro-Caribbean music genres including calypso, salsa and Son cubano.

===== Cabasa =====
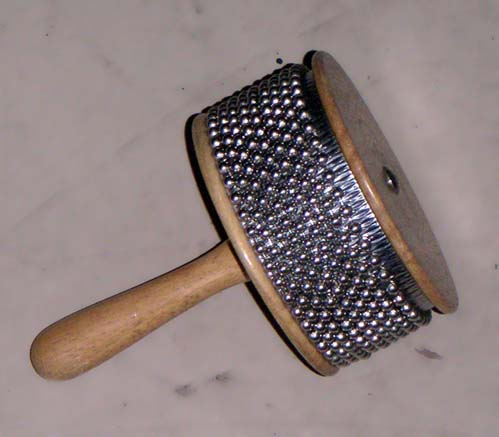
Cabasa

Main article: cabasa

The cabasa (also called afuche, afoxê, cabaça, cabazam, cockolo) consists of steel balls that are looped around a hollow base. The balls are then struck by hand to produce a rattling sound. This percussion instrument has African Origin but is also found in Latin American musical history.

===== Güiro =====
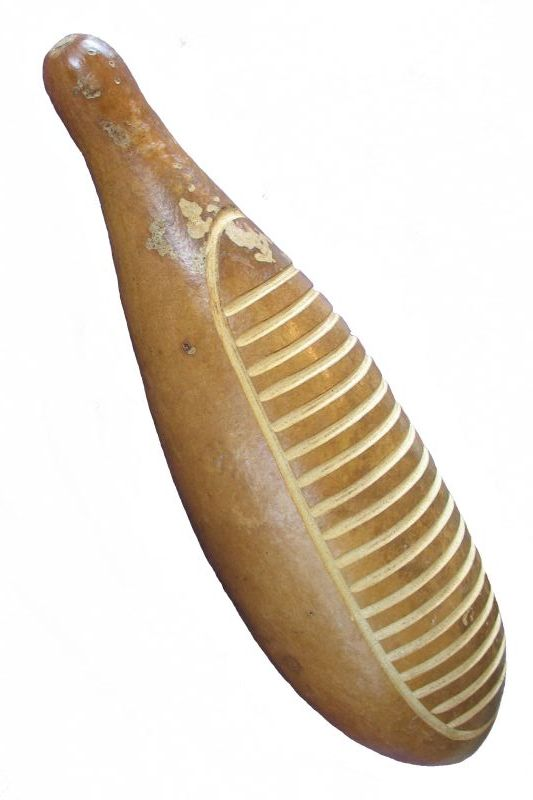
35cm long güiro from Cuba

Main article: güiro

The güiro (also called lero-lero, rape de bois, querēquezé, reposing tiger, reco-reco) is a form of scraper instrument, consisting of the body of the instrument – a cylindrical, hollowed out piece of wood with several notches on one side – and a scraping implement such as a stick or piece of wood. Rubbing of the scraping implement down the notches produces a ‘reco-reco’ sound. The ‘reco-reco’ sound produced gives this instrument one of its many other names, the ‘reco-reco’. The güiro is used, in conjunction with other percussive instruments, to maintain rhythm in afro-Caribbean music.

===== Agogô =====
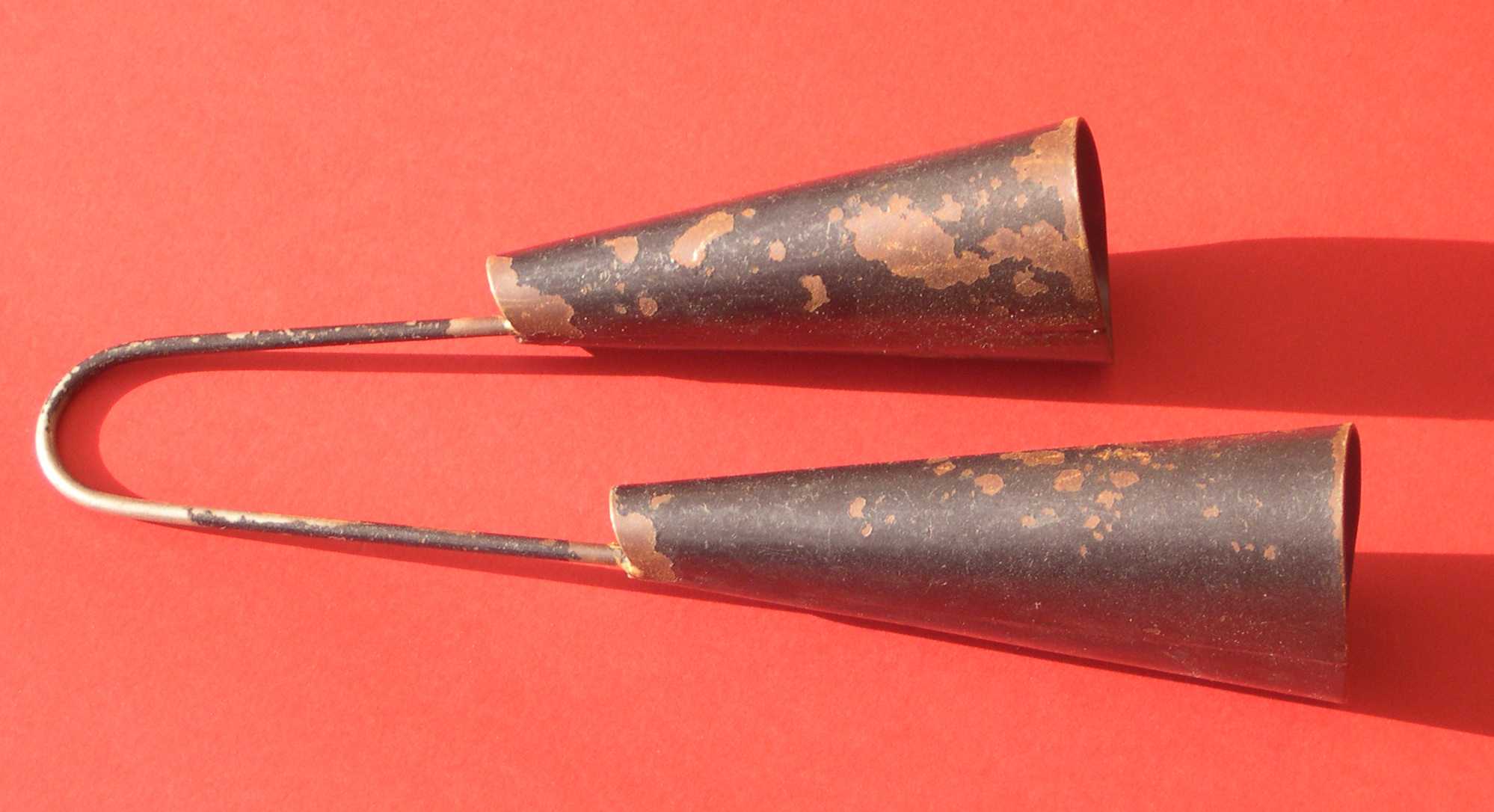
Agogo bell

Main article: agogô

The Agogô (also called ga, gankogui, gongue) is a variety of bell used in afro-Caribbean music, they can include single, double or multi-headed bells that are attached to a metal handle. The bells consist of a hollow, conical shaped item that jingles when shaken or struck. Agogô bells are of Western African origin but are now also used in Brazilian and Latin American music.

==== Guitars ====
The use of Guitars in afro-Caribbean music is reminiscent of European influence. The guitars most commonly used in afro-Caribbean music include the guitarrone, the tres and the cuatro. These regional varieties of guitars are based on classic European guitars such as the Spanish vihuela.

===== Guitarrón =====
Main article: guitarrón

The guitarrón (also known as guitarrone) is a large form of acoustic guitar. It is a bass stringed instrument consisting of a wooden body, sound board and six plastic or metal strings.

===== Tres =====
Main article: tres

The tres is a small guitar consisting of a wooden body with three sets of double strings. The tres originated in Cuba and is the national string instrument. This variety of guitar was derived from similar instruments of both Spanish and indigenous African origin. It is a component of many afro-Caribbean music genres including changüí, Sucu Sucu, salsa and guaracha.

===== Cuatro =====
The cuatro is a small, Spanish-derived guitar consisting of a wooden body and four strings. The cuatro acts as an accent to the bass notes of the guitar, providing syncopation. Variants of the cuatro, such as the Venezuelan cuatro and the Puerto Rican cuatro, are common throughout the Caribbean. The Venezuelan and Puerto Rican Cuatros are each national instruments of their respective countries. The cuatro guitar is a component of afro-Caribbean subgenres such as calypso.

== Afro-Caribbean sub-genres ==
=== Son Cubano ===
Main article: son cubano

Son Cubano originated in Cuba among afro-Caribbean people of Bantu descent. Son Cubano incorporates European and African instruments and musical components. African influence is seen in the use of percussive instruments such as bongos, congas and claves. While Spanish influence is evident through the use of guitars and harmonic vocals.

Example of salsa music

=== Salsa ===
Main article: salsa

Salsa is a sub-genre of afro-Caribbean music that has both African and Spanish influences. This sub-genre is a modernised version of another afro-Cuban music genre, Son cubano. In addition to Son Cubano, salsa is influenced by the danzón, rumba, guaracha, cha-cha-cha, mambo and a variety of other afro-Caribbean genres. Although salsa is deeply rooted in afro-Caribbean music genres, salsa originated and developed in New York City in the 1960s. African elements in salsa music include call-and-response invocations and the use of African derived instruments such as bongos and conga drums. The Spanish influence of salsa music is seen through the Spanish-language song lyrics and use of European instruments such as the tres guitar. Salsa includes the use of clave rhythms, call-and-response invocations and rhythmic syncopation. Key salsa instruments include bongos, Congas, claves, Maracas, Güiros and the piano.

=== Calypso ===
Main article: calypso

Calypso is a sub-genre of afro-Caribbean music that originated in Trinidad and Tobago. Calypso music is played in 4/4 time and utilises syncopated rhythms. The use of drums, percussion and call-and-response invocations are examples of the African influence in calypso music. The simple harmonies, acoustic and Bass guitars present in Calypso music are due to European influence.

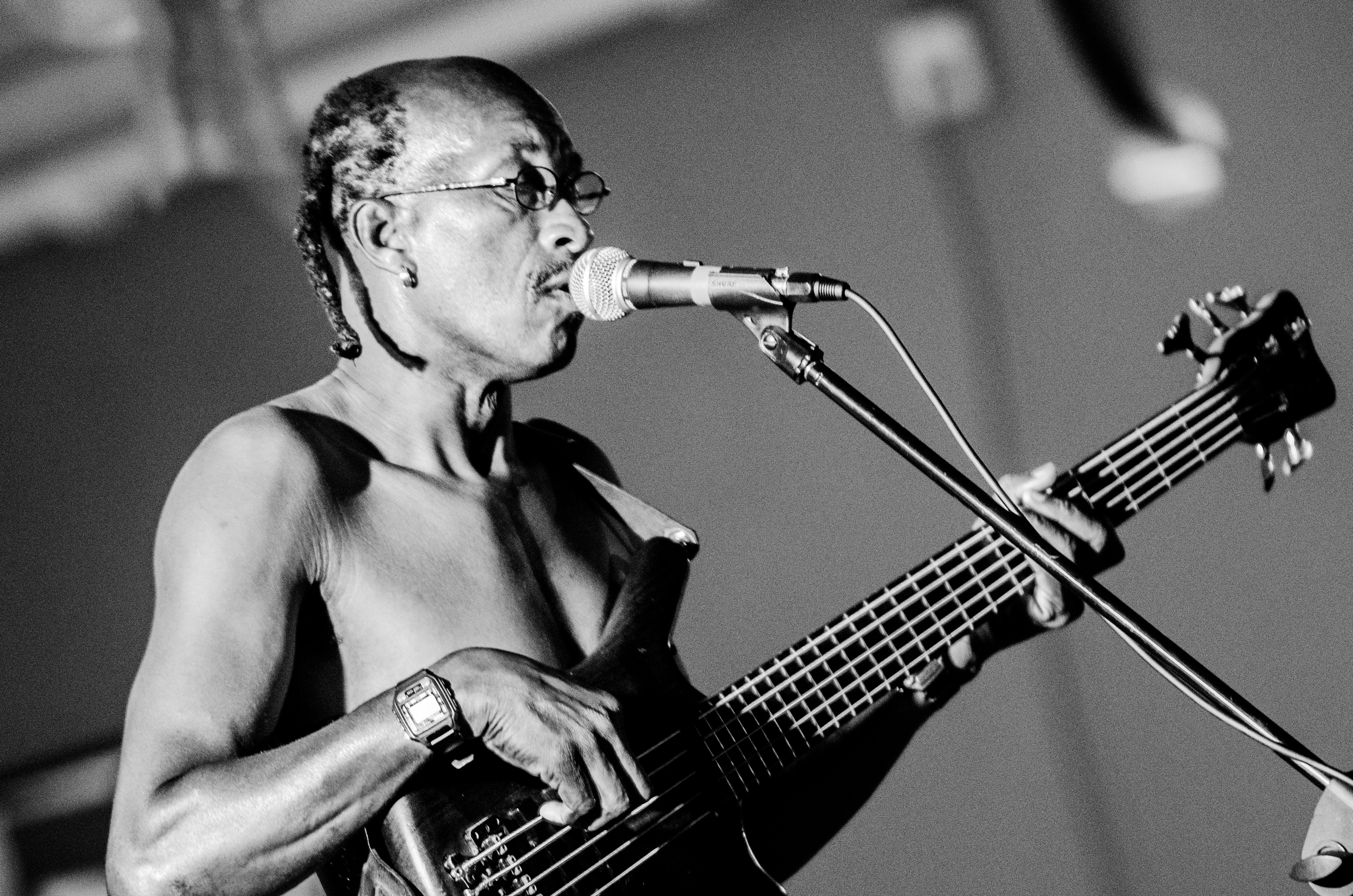
Photo of David Edwards, a member of popular soca-band, the Burning Flames

=== Soca ===
Main article: soca

Soca originated in the 1970s in Trinidad and Tobago . Soca was influenced by other afro-Caribbean music styles such as reggae, calypso and salsa. African elements present in soca include the use of percussive instruments and the tresillo beat, which is reminiscent of music from Western Africa. This genre was also influenced by European and American music styles such as hip-hop and rhythm and blues. Instruments used in soca music include Guitars, horns and percussive instruments. Soca music incorporates the habanera rhythm which is of Congolese origin.

=== Mento ===
Main article: mento

Mento (also known as Jamaican calypso) is a type of afro-Caribbean folk music that originated in Jamaica. This genre was a precursor of other afro-Caribbean sub-genres such as ska and reggae. Mento incorporates African rhythmic elements, such as the drums, with European elements, such as the guitar and the use of melodies. Like other Jamaican music genres, mento places emphasis on the after-beat.

Example of ska music: audio sample of the song "Blue Ska" by Kevin MacLeod

=== Ska ===
Main article: ska

Ska is a fusion genre of mento combined with rhythm and blues, that began in Jamaica in the 1950s. Unlike American music, ska is defined by its emphasis on the after-beat instead of the downbeat. This means that emphasis is placed on the second and fourth beats of the 4/4 time signature. This emphasis on the after-beat is present in African rhythmic practices and mento music. Ska shows European influence through the use of guitars and horn instruments. This genre is a predecessor of another Jamaican sub-genre of afro-Caribbean music, Reggae.

Example of reggae music: audio sample of the song "Tea Roots" by Kevin MacLeod

=== Reggae ===
Main article: reggae

Reggae is a variation of ska that emerged in the 1960s in Jamaica. The lyrics in reggae music are closely aligned with the Rastafarian religion and focus on themes of politics and spirituality. Through these lyrics, reggae has made public the issues of the poverty and inequality present in Jamaica. Key Rastafarian philosophies contribute to the African influence of reggae music. These philosophies include African nationalism and a desire to live separate from European culture.

An example of merengue music

=== Merengue ===
Main article: merengue

Merengue is an afro-Caribbean music subgenre that originated in the Dominican Republic. The Dominican merengue is a close variation of the Haitian mereng. Merengue incorporates many African elements such as the use of call and response invocations, drums and guiros. European elements that are included in merengue include use of the cuatro guitar, harmonic melodies and the accordion.

==== Haitian Mereng ====
Mereng originated in Haiti as a fusion genre of traditional African music mixed with European elements. The mereng is influenced by the African music genres of chica and calenda, and the European genre of contredanse.

== See also ==
- Caribbean music in the United Kingdom
- Music of the African diaspora
- Music of the Bahamas
- Music of Barbados
- Music of Belize
- Music of Colombia
- Music of Cuba
- Music of Dominica
- Music of the Dominican Republic
- Music of Guadeloupe
- Music of Guyana
- Music of Haiti
- Music of Jamaica
- Music of Martinique
- Music of Montserrat
- Music of Panama
- Music of Puerto Rico
- Music of Suriname
- Music of Trinidad and Tobago
- Music of Venezuela

== Bibliography ==
- Leymarie, Isabelle (1993). La salsa et le Latin Jazz. Paris: PUF. ISBN 2130453171.
- Leymarie, Isabelle (1996). Du tango au reggae: musiques noires d'Amérique latine et des Caraïbes. Paris: Flammarion. ISBN 2082108139.
- Leymarie, Isabelle (1997). La música latinoaméricana: Ritmos y danzas de un continente. Barcelona: BSA. ISBN 8440677057.
- Leymarie, Isabelle (1998). Músicas del Caribe. Madrid: Akal. ISBN 8440677057.
- Leymarie, Isabelle (1998). Cuba: La Musique des dieux. Paris: Éditions du Layeur. ISBN 2911468163.
- Leymarie, Isabelle (2002). Cuban Fire: The Story of Salsa and Latin Jazz. New York: Continuum. ISBN 0826455867.
- Leymarie, Isabelle (2003). La Música cubana: Cuba. Barcelona: Océano. ISBN 8449424097.
- Leymarie, Isabelle (2003) [1998]. Dizzy Gillespie. Paris: Vade Retro, Buchet Chastel. ISBN 2909828735.
- Leymarie, Isabelle (2005). Jazz Latino. Barcelona: Robinbook. ISBN 8496222276.
