= Latin jazz =

Styles of jazz influenced by Latin American music

- Stylistic origins: Afro-Cuban jazz: Cuban music; jazz; Afro-Brazilian jazz: Brazilian music; jazz
- Cultural origins: Cuba; New York City, United States; and Brazil

Regional scenes
- Cuba; United States; Mexico; Guatemala; El Salvador; Honduras; Nicaragua; Costa Rica; Panama; Brazil; Dominican Republic; Puerto Rico; Ecuador; Colombia; Peru; Bolivia; Argentina; Venezuela; Chile; Paraguay; Uruguay

Latin jazz is a genre of jazz with Latin American rhythms. The two main categories are Afro-Cuban jazz, rhythmically based on Cuban popular dance music, with a rhythm section employing ostinato patterns or a clave, and Afro-Brazilian jazz, which includes samba and bossa nova.

== Afro-Cuban jazz ==
=== "Spanish tinge"—The Cuban influence in early jazz and proto-Latin jazz ===
African American music began incorporating Afro-Cuban musical motifs in the 19th century, when the habanera (Cuban contradanza) gained international popularity. The habanera was the first written music to be rhythmically based on an African motif. The habanera rhythm (also known as congo, tango-congo, or tango) can be thought of as a combination of tresillo and the backbeat. Wynton Marsalis considers tresillo to be the New Orleans "clave," although technically, the pattern is only half a clave.

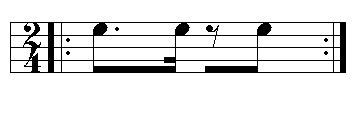
Tresillo

Habanera rhythm

"St. Louis Blues" (1914) by W. C. Handy has a habanera-tresillo bass line. Handy noted a reaction to the habanera rhythm included in Will H. Tyler's "Maori": "I observed that there was a sudden, proud and graceful reaction to the rhythm...White dancers, as I had observed them, took the number in stride. I began to suspect that there was something Negroid in that beat." After noting a similar reaction to the same rhythm in "La Paloma", Handy included this rhythm in his "St. Louis Blues", the instrumental copy of "Memphis Blues", the chorus of "Beale Street Blues", and other compositions. Jelly Roll Morton considered the tresillo-habanera (which he called the Spanish tinge) to be an essential ingredient of jazz. The habanera rhythm can be heard in his left hand on songs like "The Crave" (1910, recorded 1938).

Now in one of my earliest tunes, "New Orleans Blues," you can notice the Spanish tinge. In fact, if you can't manage to put tinges of Spanish in your tunes, you will never be able to get the right seasoning, I call it, for jazz—Morton (1938: Library of Congress Recording).

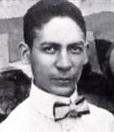
Jelly Roll Morton

Although the exact origins of jazz syncopation may never be known, there is evidence that the habanera-tresillo was there at its conception. Buddy Bolden, the first known jazz musician, is credited with creating the big four, a habanera-based pattern. The big four (below) was the first syncopated bass drum pattern to deviate from the standard on-the-beat march. As the example below shows, the second half of the big four pattern is the habanera rhythm.

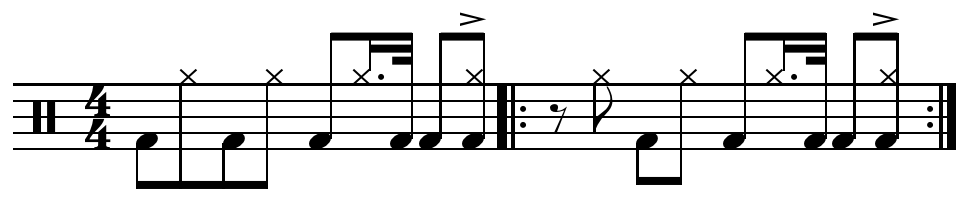
Buddy Bolden's "big four" pattern

It is probably safe to say that by and large the simpler African rhythmic patterns survived in jazz ... because they could be adapted more readily to European rhythmic conceptions. Some survived, others were discarded as the Europeanization progressed. It may also account for the fact that patterns such as [tresillo have] . . . remained one of the most useful and common syncopated patterns in jazz—Schuller (1968).

The Cuban influence is evident in many pre-1940s jazz tunes, but rhythmically, they are all based on single-celled motifs such as tresillo, and do not contain an overt two-celled, clave-based structure. "Caravan", written by Juan Tizol and Duke Ellington and first performed in 1936, is an early proto-Latin jazz composition. Mongo Santamaría recorded "Watermelon Man" in 1962. Hank Mobley, Kenny Dorham, and Willie Bobo released latin jazz albums. Willie Bobo fused jazz, latin, and R&B music.

=== Jazz in-clave ===
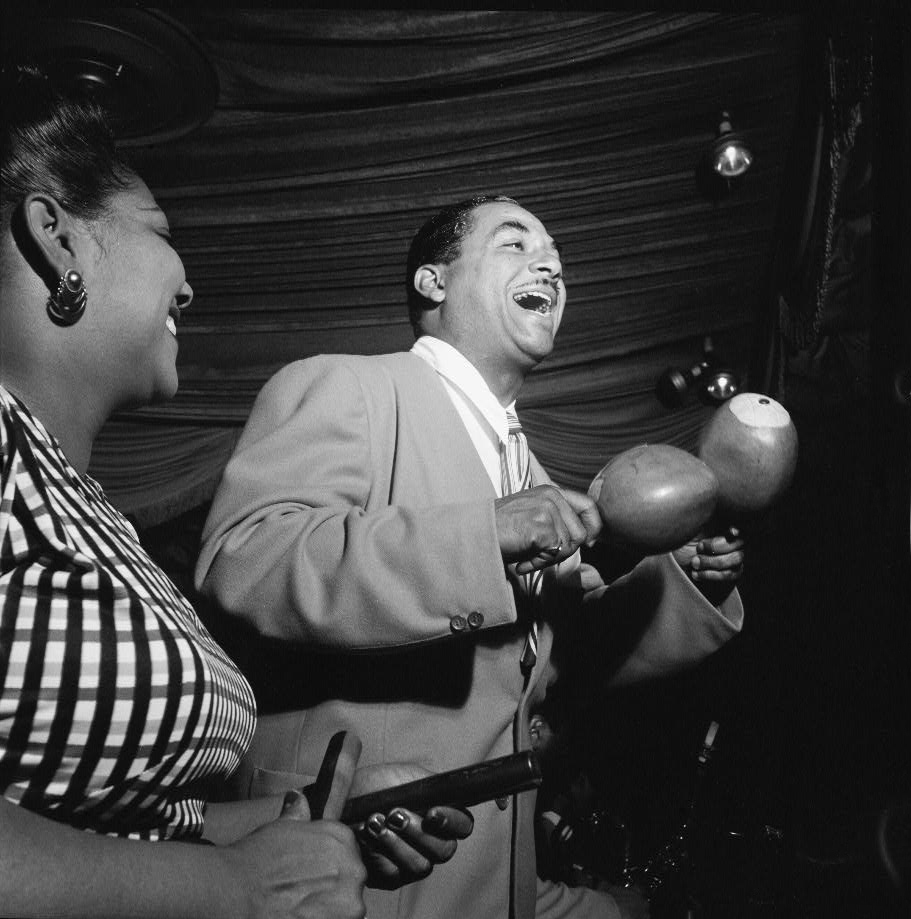
Machito and his sister Graciela

The first jazz piece to be overtly based in-clave, and therefore, the first true Latin jazz piece, was "Tanga" (1943) composed by Mario Bauza and recorded by Machito and his Afro-Cubans the same year, 1943. The tune was initially a descarga (Cuban jam) with jazz solos superimposed, spontaneously composed by Bauzá.

The right hand of the "Tanga" piano guajeo is in the style known as ponchando, a type of non-arpeggiated guajeo using block chords. The sequence of attack-points is emphasized, rather than a sequence of different pitches. As a form of accompaniment it can be played in a strictly repetitive fashion or as a varied motif akin to jazz comping. The following example is in the style of a 1949 recording by Machito. 2‐3 clave, piano by René Hernández.

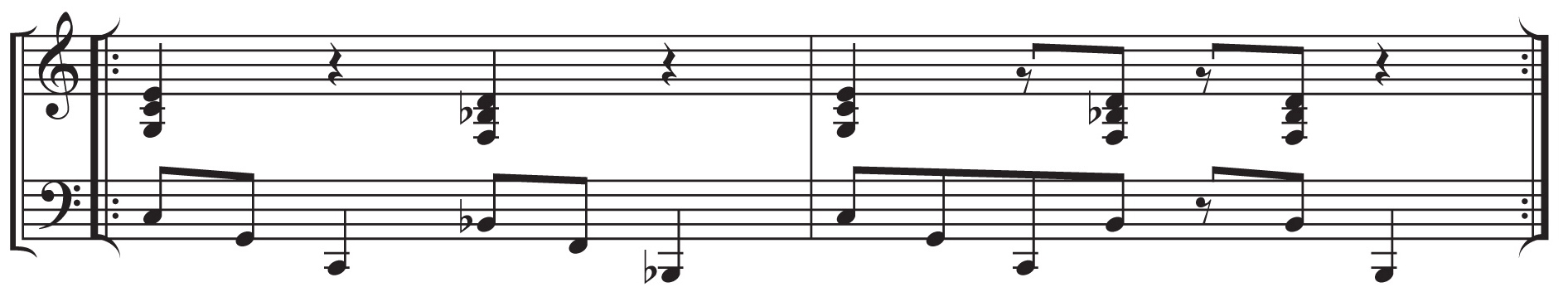
"Tanga" in the style of Machito and His Afro‐Cubans (recorded 1949). 2‐3 clave, piano: René Hernández.

The first descarga that made the world take notice is traced to a Machito rehearsal on May 29, 1943, at the Park Palace Ballroom, at 110th Street and 5th Avenue. At this time, Machito was at Fort Dix (New Jersey) in his fourth week of basic training. The day before at La Conga Club, Mario Bauza, Machito's trumpeter and music director, heard pianist Luis Varona and bassist Julio Andino play El Botellero composition and arrangements of the Cuban-born Gilberto Valdez which would serve as a permanent sign off (end the dance) tune.

On this Monday evening, Dr. Bauza leaned over the piano and instructed Varona to play the same piano vamp he did the night before. Varona's left hand began the introduction of Gilberto Valdes' El Botellero. Bauza then instructed Julio Andino what to play; then the saxes; then the trumpets. The broken chord sounds soon began to take shape into an Afro-Cuban jazzed up melody. Gene Johnson's alto sax then emitted oriental-like jazz phrases. Afro-Cuban jazz was invented when Bauza composed "Tanga" (African word for marijuana) that evening of 1943.

Thereafter, whenever "Tanga" was played, it sounded different, depending on a soloist's individuality. In August 1948, when trumpeter Howard McGhee soloed with Machito's orchestra at the Apollo Theatre, his ad-libs to "Tanga" resulted in "Cu-Bop City," a tune which was recorded by Roost Records months later. The jams which took place at the Royal Roots, Bop City and Birdland between 1948 and 1949, when Howard McGhee, tenor saxophonist Brew Moore, Charlie Parker and Dizzy Gillespie sat in with the Machito orchestra, were unrehearsed, uninhibited, unheard-of-before jam sessions which at the time, master of ceremonies Symphony Sid called Afro-Cuban jazz.

The Machito orchestra's ten- or fifteen-minute jams were the first in Latin music to break away from the traditional under-four-minute recordings. In February 1949, the Machito orchestra became the first to set a precedent in Latin music when it featured tenor saxophonist Flip Phillips in a five-minute recording of "Tanga." The twelve-inch 78 RPM, part of The Jazz Scene album, sold for $25—Salazar (1997).

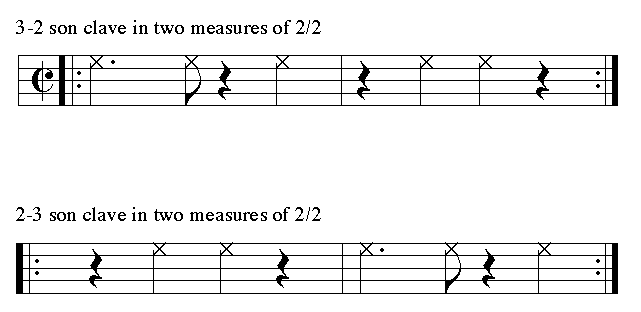
3-2 clave and 2-3 clave written in cut-time

Mario Bauzá developed the 3-2 / 2-3 clave concept and terminology. A chord progression can begin on either side of clave. When the progression begins on the three-side, the song or song section is said to be in 3–2 clave. When the chord progression begins on the two-side, it is in 2–3 clave. In North America, salsa and Latin jazz charts commonly represent clave in two measures of cut-time (2/2); this is most likely the influence of jazz conventions. When clave is written in two measures (above) changing from one clave sequence to the other is a matter of reversing the order of the measures.

Bobby Sanabria, who was Bauzá's drummer, cites several important innovations of Machito's band:

- The first band to explore jazz arranging techniques with authentic Afro-Cuban rhythms on a consistent basis giving it a unique identifiable sound that no other band in the genre of Afro-Cuban based dance music had at the time. Cuban big band arranger Chico O'Farill stated: "This was a new concept in interpreting Cuban music with as much (harmonic) richness as possible. You have to understand how important this was. It made every other band that came after, followers."
- The first band to explore modal harmony (a concept explored much later by Miles Davis and Gil Evans) from a jazz arranging perspective through their recording of "Tanga." Of note is the sheet of sound effect in the arrangement through the use of multiple layering.
- The first big band to explore, from an Afro-Cuban rhythmic perspective, large-scale extended compositional works. e.g. "The Afro-Cuban Jazz Suite" by Chico O'Farill.
- The first band to successfully wed jazz big band arranging techniques within an original composition with jazz oriented soloists utilizing an authentic Afro-Cuban based rhythm section in a successful manner. e.g. Gene Johnson - alto, Brew Moore - tenor, composition - "Tanga" (1943).
- The first Afro-Cuban based dance band to overtly explore the concept of clave counterpoint from an arranging standpoint. The ability to weave seamlessly from one side of the clave to the other without breaking its rhythmic integrity within the structure of a musical arrangement.

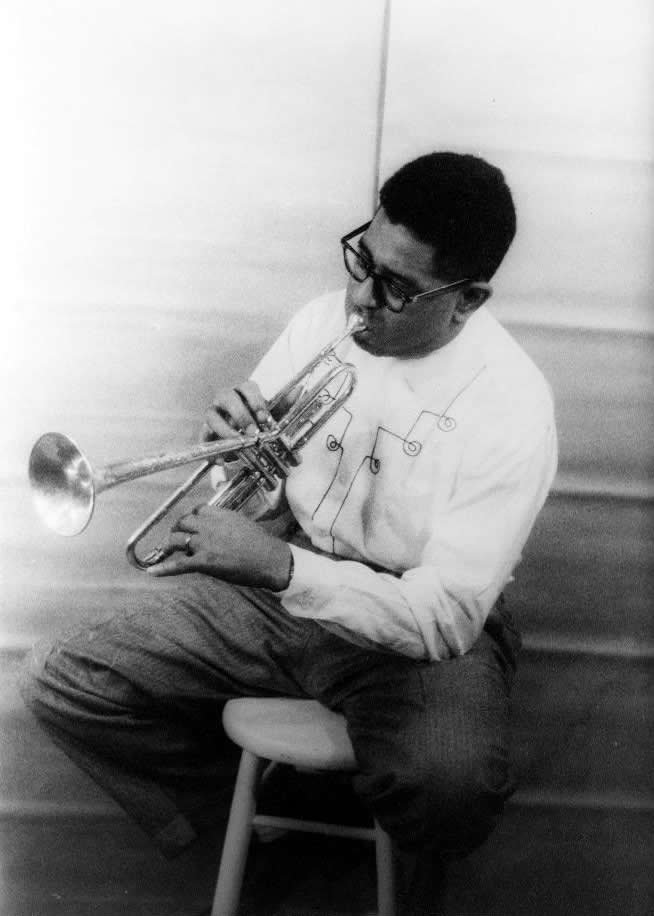
Dizzy Gillespie, 1955

Bauzá introduced bebop innovator Dizzy Gillespie to the Cuban conga drummer Chano Pozo. "Manteca" is the first jazz standard to be rhythmically based on clave. "Manteca" was co-written by Dizzy Gillespie and Chano Pozo in 1947. According to Gillespie, Pozo created the layered, contrapuntal guajeos (Afro-Cuban ostinatos) of the A section and the introduction, and Gillespie wrote the bridge. The rhythm of the melody of the A section is identical to a common mambo bell pattern.

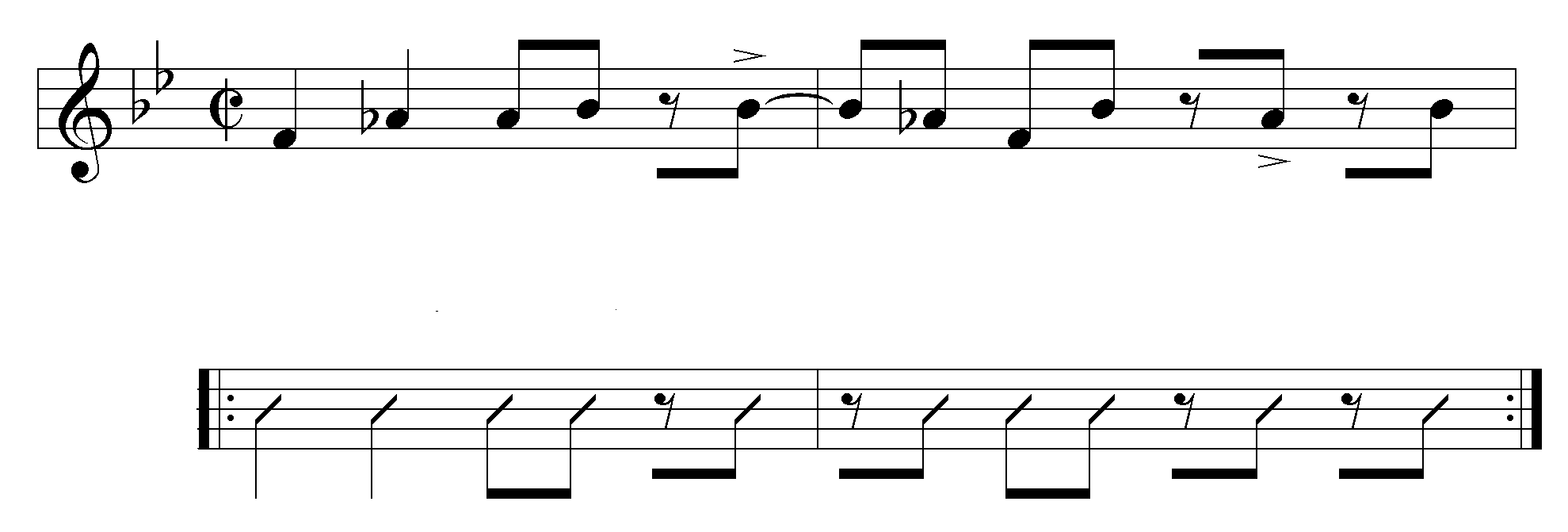
Top: opening measures of "Manteca" melody. Bottom: common mambo bell pattern (2-3 clave).

On March 31, 1946, Stan Kenton recorded "Machito," written by his collaborator / arranger Pete Rugolo, which is considered by some to be the first Latin jazz recording by American jazz musicians. The Kenton band was augmented by Ivan Lopez on bongos and Eugenio Reyes on maracas. Later, on December 6 the same year, Stan Kenton recorded an arrangement of the Afro-Cuban tune "The Peanut Vendor" with members of Machito's rhythm section.

=== Latin Jazz 1950s - 1960s ===
Kenny Dorham "Minor's Holiday", "Basheer's Dream", Hank Mobley "Recado Bossa Nova" and Sabu Martinez jazz tune developed Afro-Cuban jazz from 50s to 60s.

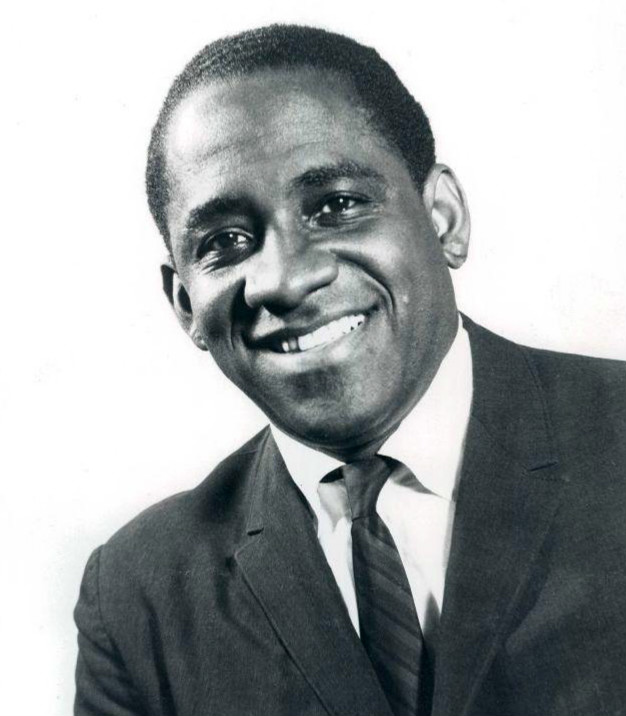
Mongo Santamaria, 1969

Cuban percussionist Mongo Santamaria recorded album "Afro Blue" in 1959. "Afro Blue" was the first jazz standard built upon a typical African three-against-two (3:2) cross-rhythm, or hemiola. The song begins with the bass repeatedly playing 6 cross-beats per each measure of 12/8, or 6 cross-beats per 4 main beats—6:4 (two cells of 3:2). The following example shows the original ostinato "Afro Blue" bass line. The slashed noteheads indicate the main beats (not bass notes), where you would normally tap your foot to "keep time."

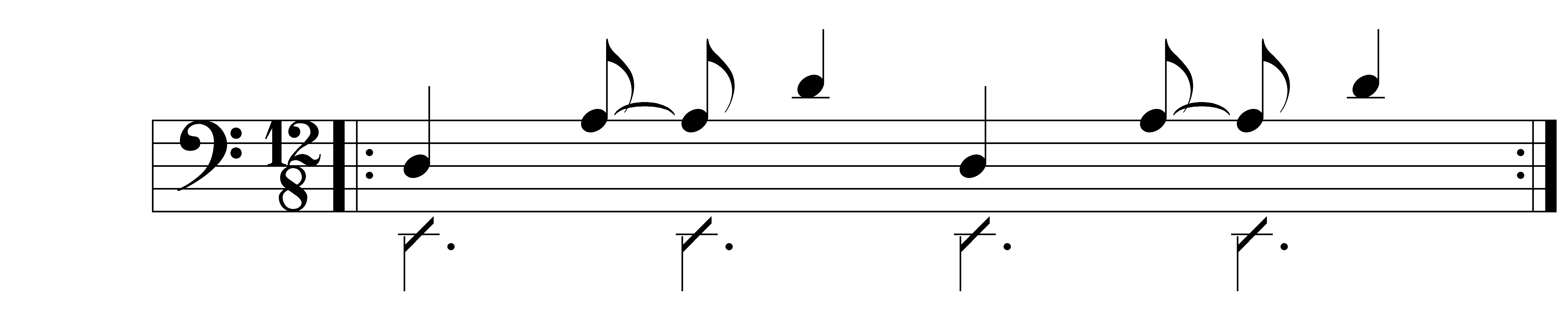
"Afro Blue" bass line, with main beats indicated by slashed noteheads

=== Bossa nova ===
Bossa nova is a hybrid form based on the samba rhythm, but influenced by European and American music from Debussy to US jazz. Bossa nova originated in the 1950s, largely from the efforts of Brazilians Antonio Carlos Jobim and João Gilberto. Its most famous song is arguably "The Girl from Ipanema" sung by Gilberto and his wife, Astrud Gilberto. While the musical style evolved from samba, it is more complex harmonically and less percussive. Bossa nova emerged primarily from the upscale beachside neighborhoods of Rio de Janeiro as opposed to samba's origins in the favelas of Rio. Certain similar elements were already evident, even influencing Western classical music like Gershwin's Cuban Overture which has the characteristic 'Latin' clave rhythm. The influence on bossa nova of jazz styles such as cool jazz is often debated by historians and fans, but a similar "cool sensibility" is apparent.

Bossa nova was developed in Brazil in the mid-1950s, with its creation being credited to artists including Johnny Alf, Antonio Carlos Jobim and João Gilberto. One of the first songs was "Bim-Bom"(Gilberto). Bossa nova was made popular by Dorival Caymmi's "Saudade da Bahia" and Elizete Cardoso's recording of "Chega de Saudade" on the Canção do Amor Demais LP, composed by Vinícius de Moraes (lyrics) and Antonio Carlos Jobim (music). The song was soon after released by Gilberto.

The initial releases by Gilberto and the internationally popular 1959 film Orfeu Negro ("Black Orpheus", with score by Luiz Bonfá) brought significant popularity of this musical style in Brazil and elsewhere in Latin America, which spread to North America via visiting American jazz musicians. The resulting recordings by Charlie Byrd and Stan Getz cemented its popularity and led to a worldwide boom with 1964's Getz/Gilberto, numerous recordings by famous jazz performers such as Ella Fitzgerald (Ella Abraça Jobim) and Frank Sinatra (Francis Albert Sinatra & Antônio Carlos Jobim). Since that time, the bossa nova style maintains a lasting influence in world music for several decades and even up to the present.

The first bossa nova single to achieve international popularity was perhaps the most successful of all time, the 1964 Getz/Gilberto recording "The Girl From Ipanema", edited to include only the singing of Astrud Gilberto, Gilberto's then wife. The genre would withstand substantial "watering down" by popular artists throughout the next four decades.

An early influence on bossa nova was the song "Dans mon île" by French singer Henri Salvador, featured in the 1957 Italian movie Europa di notte by Alessandro Blasetti; the song was distributed in Brazil and covered later by Brazilian artists Eumir Deodato (Los Danseros en Bolero – 1964) and Caetano Veloso (Outras Palavras – 1981). In 2005, Henri Salvador was awarded the Brazilian Order of Cultural Merit, which he received from singer and Minister of Culture, Gilberto Gil, in the presence of President Lula for his influence on Brazilian culture.

The so-called "bossa nova clave" (or "Brazilian clave") is played on the snare rim of the drum kit in bossa nova. The pattern has a similar rhythm to that of the son clave, but the second note on the two-side is delayed by one pulse (subdivision). The pattern is shown below in 2/4, as it is written in Brazil. In North American charts it is more likely to be written in cut-time.

Bossa nova snare rim pattern

According to drummer Bobby Sanabria the Brazilian composer Antonio Carlos Jobim, who developed the pattern, considers it to be merely a rhythmic motif and not a clave (guide pattern). Jobim later regretted that Latino musicians misunderstood the role of this bossa nova pattern.

=== Beyond Latin jazz ===
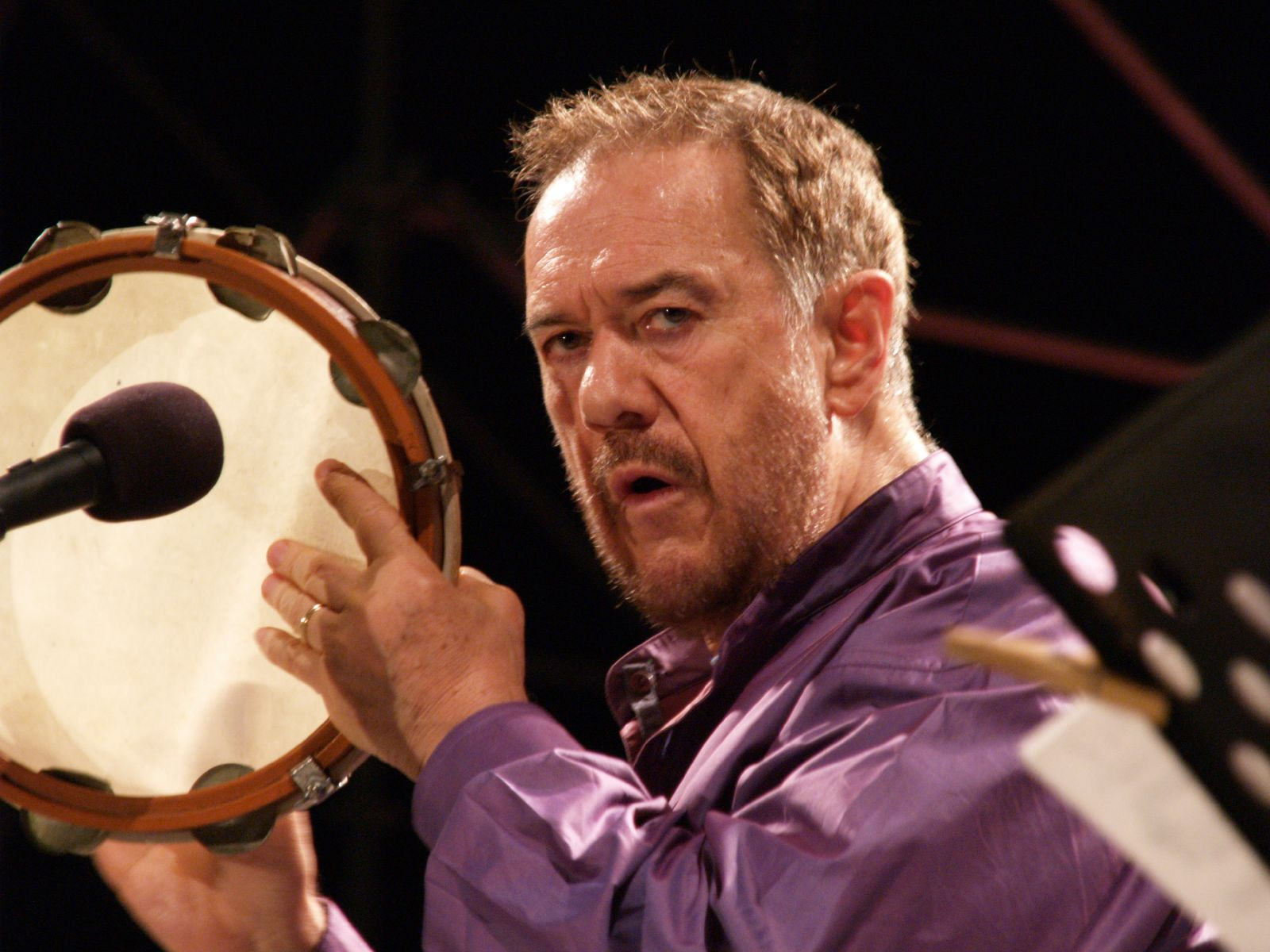
Brazilian percussionist Airto Moreira

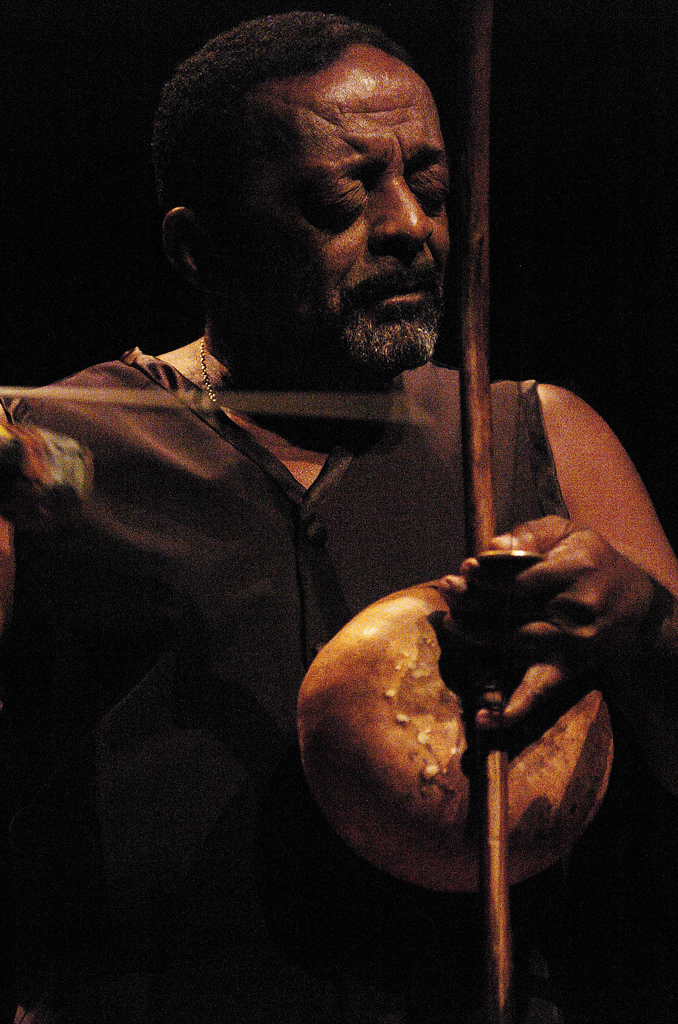
Naná Vasconcelos playing the Afro-Brazilian Berimbau

Brazilian percussionist Airto Moreira became a professional musician at age 13. He won acclaim as a member of the samba jazz pioneers Sambalanço Trio and for his landmark recording Quarteto Novo with Hermeto Pascoal in 1967. Shortly after, he followed his wife Flora Purim to the United States. Once in the U.S., Airto introduced Afro-Brazilian folkloric instruments into a wide variety of jazz styles, in ways that had not been done before. However, the terms jazz samba or Latin jazz are too limiting a label for the types of music Airto participated in the U.S. during the 1970s. Airto played in the two most important avant-garde electric jazz bands of the day—Miles Davis and Weather Report. He also performed on more mainstream albums, such as those of CTI Records. Besides energetic rhythmic textures, Airto added percussion color, using bells, shakers, and whistles to create evocative textures of timbre. Airto paved the way for other avant garde Brazilian musicians such as Hermeto Pascoal, to enter the North American jazz scene.

Early 1970s, Deodato released big hit crossover jazz album "Prelude". Another innovative Brazilian percussionist is Naná Vasconcelos. Vasconcelos contributed to four Jon Hassell albums from 1976 to 1980 (including Possible Musics by Brian Eno and Hassell), and later to several Pat Metheny Group works and Jan Garbarek concerts from early 1980s to early 1990s. In 1976 joined Egberto Gismonti to record Dança das cabeças in ECM label. In 1984 he appeared on the Pierre Favre album Singing Drums along with Paul Motian. He also appears on Arild Andersen's album "If You Look Far Enough" with Ralph Towner. Vasconcelos formed a group named Codona with Don Cherry and Collin Walcott, which released three albums in 1978, 1980 and 1982. While Vasconcelos uses Afro-Brazilian rhythms and instruments, he like Airto, transcend the categories of Brazilian jazz and Latin jazz.

== Comparing Latin jazz with straight-ahead jazz ==
In comparison with straight-ahead jazz, Latin jazz employs straight rhythm (or "even-eighths"), rather than swung rhythm. Early Latin jazz rarely employed a backbeat, but contemporary forms fuse the backbeat with the clave. The conga, timbale, güiro, bongos, and claves are percussion instruments often used in addition to, or in place of the drum kit.

== Formats ==
Latin jazz music, like most types of jazz music, can be played in small or large groups. Small groups, or combos, often use the bebop format made popular in the 1950s in America, where the musicians play a standard melody, many of the musicians play an improvised solo, and then everyone plays the melody again. Prominent Latin jazz big bands include Arturo O'Farrill's Afro-Latin Jazz Orchestra, Bobby Sanabria's Multiverse Big Band, Raices Jazz Orchestra, Mambo Legends Orchestra, Pacific Mambo Orchestra, as well as others. In Latin jazz bands, percussion is often featured in solos. Contemporary Latin jazz pieces by musicians such as Hermeto Pascoal are mostly composed for these small groups, with percussion solos as well as many wind-instrumentals.

== Latin jazz as global music ==
Most jazz histories emphasize the narrative that jazz is exclusively an American music—a style created by African Americans in the early 20th century, fusing elements of African rhythm and improvisations with European instrumentation, harmonies, and formal structures. The influences of musics from the Caribbean and Latin America—save Jelly Roll Morton's often quoted comments on the "Spanish tinge" rhythms of early New Orleans jazz, and trumpeter Dizzy Gillespie's famous Post-War collaborations with Afro-Cuban drummer Chano Pozo—have received little or no mention in standard jazz textbooks used in most American universities. Likewise, the influential 1973 compilation of recordings, the Smithsonian Collection of Classic Jazz, and Ken Burns' popular documentary film Jazz, make little mention of Latin jazz. More recent scholarship has challenged this paradigm, arguing that music from the Caribbean and Latin American were essential to the emergence of early New Orleans jazz, to the music's Post-War development in New York City, and to the continued evolution of jazz in twenty-first century urban centers. Proponents of this view advocate for the inclusion of influential Caribbean band leaders including Frank Machito Grillo, Mario Bauzá, Chico O'Farrill, Tito Puente, Ray Barretto, and Jerry and Andy Gonzalez in the broader jazz cannon. From this perspective, all jazz, including Latin Jazz, is not viewed as a uniquely American expression, but rather as "a global music" that is "transcultural in its stylistic scope."

== See also ==
- Calle 54 - a film about Latin jazz
- Grammy Award for Best Latin Jazz Album
- Latin Grammy Award for Best Latin Jazz/Jazz Album

== Bibliography ==
- Acosta, Leonardo (2003) One Hundred Years of Jazz in Cuba. Washington DC: Smithsonian Books.
- Campos Fonseca, Susan. "¿Una habitación propia en el "Jazz Latino"?". En: IASPM@Journal, Vol. 1, Nº2 (2010).
- Delannoy, Luc (2001) Caliente, una historia del Jazz Latino. Mexico: FCE.
- Delannoy, Luc (2005) Carambola, vidas en el Jazz Latino. Mexico: FCE.
- Delannoy, Luc (2012) Convergencias Mexico: FCE.
- Leymarie, Isabelle (1979). "Latin Jazz, the Best of Both Worlds". Jazz Spotlite News. New York.
- Leymarie, Isabelle (1985). "Salsa and Latin jazz". In Quill (ed.). Hot Sauces: Latin and Caribbean Pop. New York. pp. 94–115. ISBN 0-688-02193-X.
- Leymarie, Isabelle (1993). La Salsa et le Latin jazz. Paris: PUF. ISBN 2130453171.
- Leymarie, Isabelle (1995). Du tango au reggae: Musiques noires d'Amérique latine et des Caraïbes. Paris: Flammarion. ISBN 2082108139.
- Leymarie, Isabelle (1997). "Du boogaloo à la salsa". In Gallimard (ed.). La musique sud-américaine: rythmes et danses d'un continent. Paris. pp. 82–85. ISBN 2-07-053391-3.
- Leymarie, Isabelle (1998). "La salsa". In Ediciones Akal (ed.). Músicas del Caribe. Madrid. pp. 107–108. ISBN 84-460-0894-7.
- Leymarie, Isabelle (1998). "Du tango à la salsa: le bal sous influence latino-américaine". In Cité de la Musique (ed.). Histoires de bal. Paris. pp. 115–122. ISBN 2-906460-69-9.
- Leymarie, Isabelle (2000). "La salsa". In Editions Autrement (ed.). Danses Latines. Paris. pp. 113–123. ISBN 2-7467-0118-9.
- Leymarie, Isabelle (2002). Cuban Fire: The Story of salsa and Latin jazz. New York: Continuum. ISBN 0826455867.
- Mauleón, Rebeca (1993). Salsa Guidebook for Piano and Ensemble. Petaluma, California: Sher Music. ISBN 0-9614701-9-4.
- Peñalosa, David (2009). The Clave Matrix; Afro-Cuban Rhythm: Its Principles and African Origins. Redway, CA: Bembe Inc. ISBN 1-886502-80-3.
- Roberts, John Storm (1999) Latin Jazz. New York: Schirmer Books.
- Wasaburne, Christopher.(2020) Latin Jazz: The Other Jazz, Oxford University Press.
