= Isabelle Leymarie =

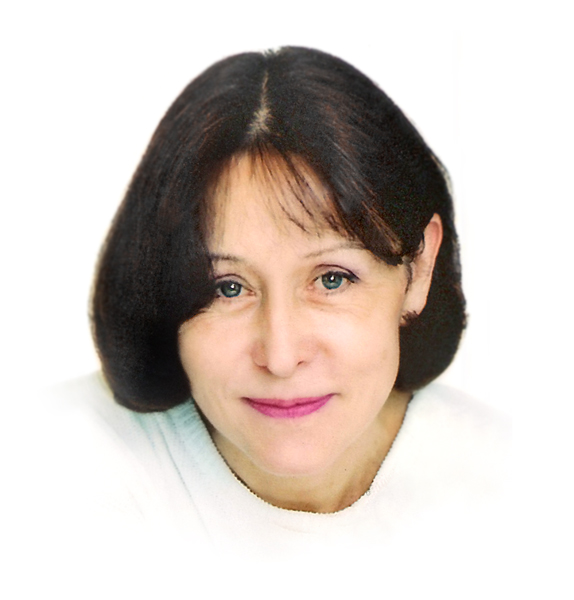
- Isabelle Leymarie in 2006
- Occupations: Musicologist, writer, pianist, filmmaker, translator, photographer
- Writing career
- Language: French, English, Spanish, Italian, German, Portuguese
- Years active: 1968–present
- Subjects: Jazz, Latin jazz, Salsa music
- Website: leymarie.net

Isabelle Leymarie is a French musicologist, writer, pianist, filmmaker, translator and photographer.

== Early life ==
As a young child, Isabelle Leymarie developed a passion for African-American music (and also Broadway tunes and the French, Spanish and Russian composers of the late 19th and early 20th century). At the age of 4 she began to study classical music privately, and then at the Conservatoire de Musique de Genève (Switzerland). She obtained a degree in sociology from the Sorbonne and studied ethnomusicology at the École pratique des hautes études in Paris. After studies for a doctorate at the Institute of International Studies in Geneva, she graduated from Columbia University with a PhD in ethnomusicology.

== Career ==
In 1968, Isabelle Leymarie worked in the African Department of the Musée national des Arts d'Afrique et d'Océanie, the Music Department of the Musée de l'Homme and at Ocora (a record label specialized in ethnic music and belonging to Radio France). In 1969, at the Panafrican Arts Festival, in Algiers, she escorted a Yoruba delegation of artists and scholars. She also taught at the American College in Leysin (Switzerland).

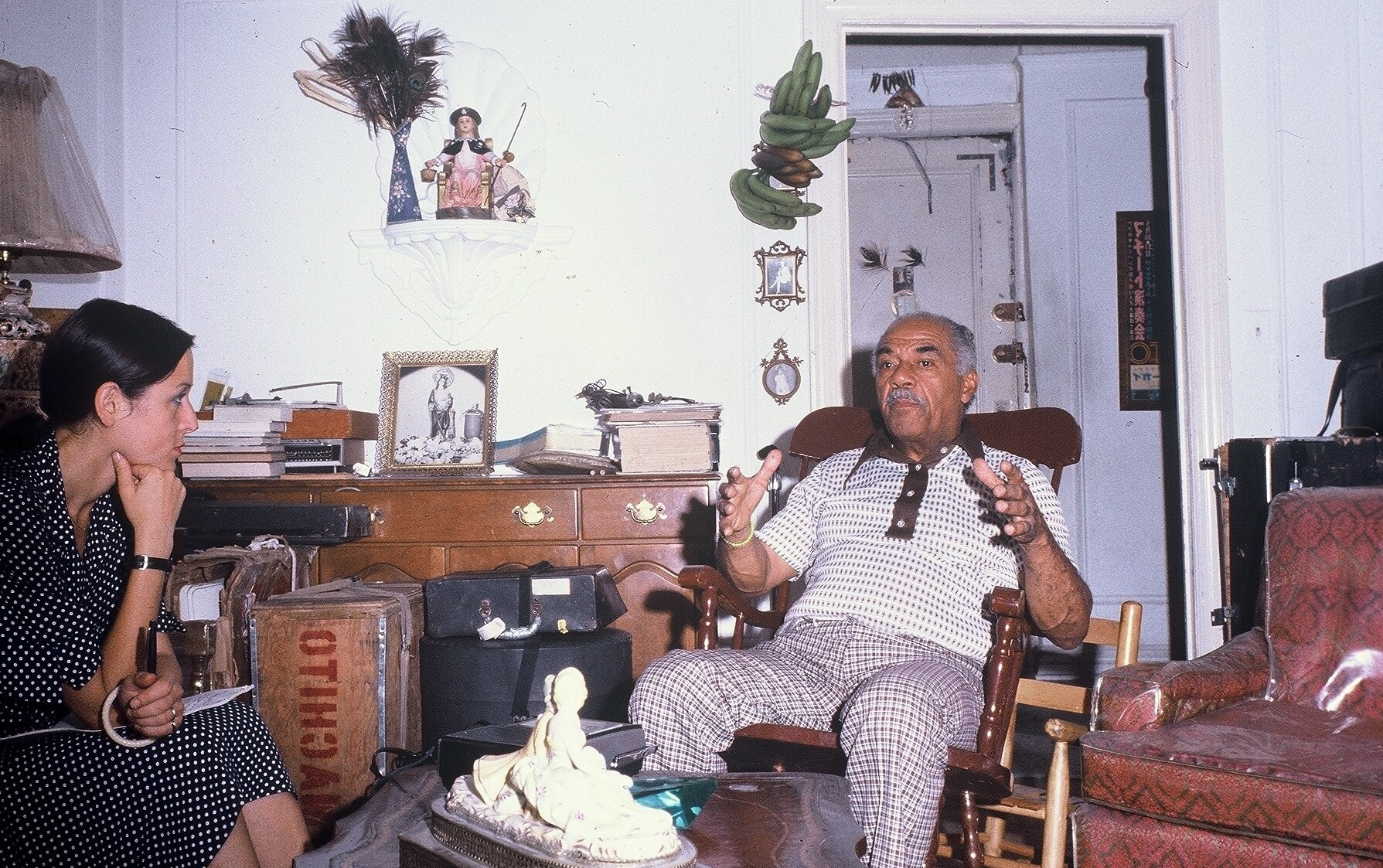
During the filming of "Machito: A Latin Jazz Legacy”

Beginning in 1970, she studied in New York at the Jazzmobile, Jazz Interactions and Muse workshops; with Barry Harris; with Charlie Palmieri at The City College of New York; and privately. She wrote film treatments for Sam Shaw (producer of John Cassavetes and photographer of Marilyn Monroe) and wrote several screenplays, among them "Malva", which was to be made by Gordon Parks Jr. before his untimely death. She was New York correspondent for the National French Radio jazz program "Black and Blue". She taught at the College For Human Services, John Jay College, Herbert Lehman College, The New School for Social Research, Cooper Union, Boricua College, the Conservatory of São Miguel (Azores, Portugal), the Jazz Department of Livingston College and Yale. She was music curator of El Museo del Barrio, in New York, consultant for the New York State Council on the Arts (NYSCA), escort-interpreter for the State Department, and consultant for various films and television programs. In 1973 she lived in Senegal, doing field work on the griots and their music.

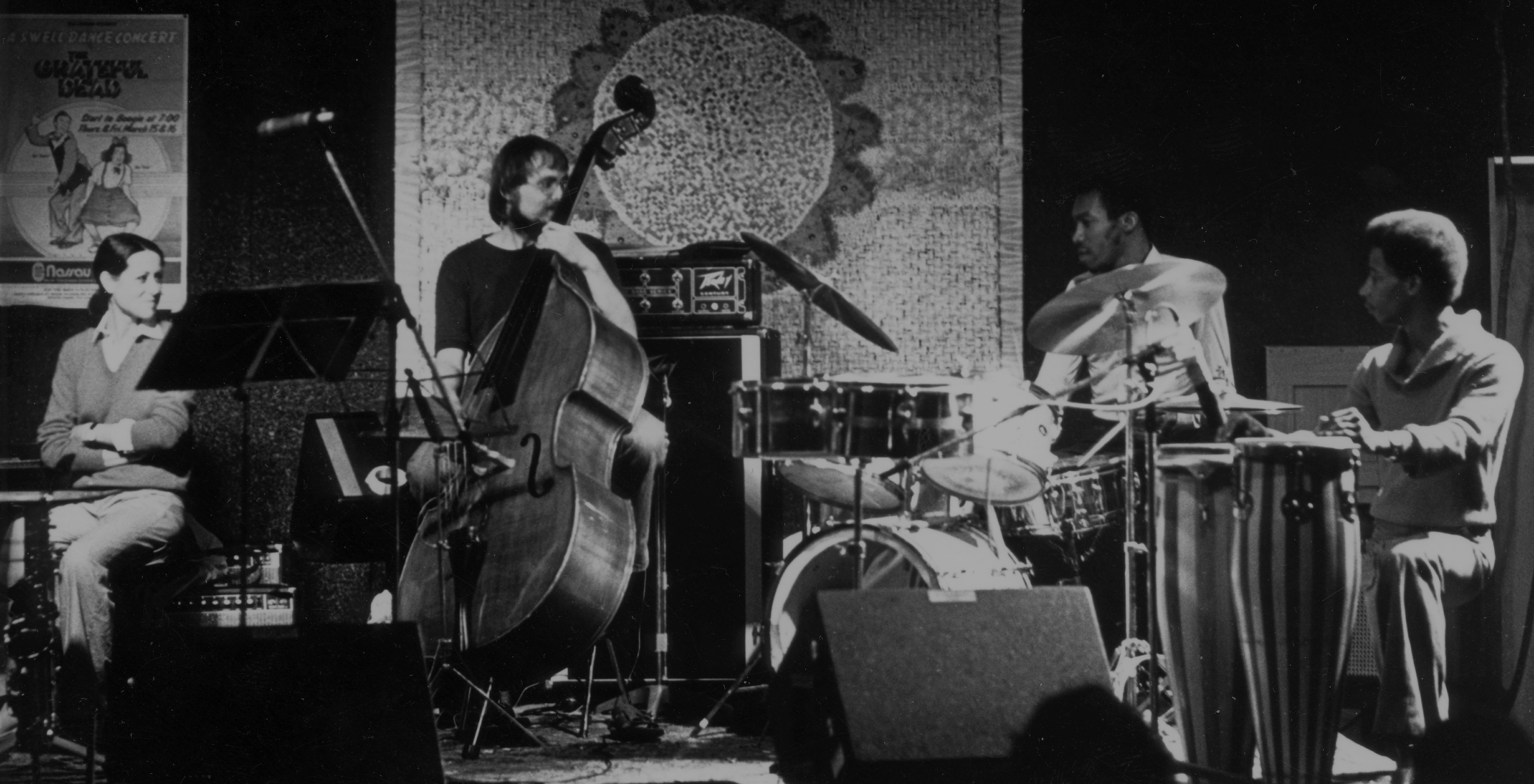
Playing at the New Morning in Geneva

As a pianist she performed in particular with the Cotton Club Orchestra (Harlem), Melba Liston (New York), Cab Calloway's bass player Jimmy Garret (Japan), Clifford Thornton (Switzerland), as well as with her own groups. She also worked with Latin bands, and sat in with the Machito orchestra at Livingston College

In the early 1990s, in Paris, she was musical director for jazz of the Théâtre du Châtelet and the fr:Auditorium des Halles (inviting Shirley Horn, Abbey Lincoln, John Stubblefield, Wynton Marsalis, Ahmad Jamal, Tommy Flanagan, Mulgrew Miller, Dom Salvador, James Newton, Angélique Kidjo, etc.). She was also in charge of the jazz festival of Le Marin (Martinique). She taught in the Jazz Department of the Conservatoire Nadia et Lili Boulanger, at the École Supérieure de Jazz and the Bill Evans Piano Academy. She was "godmother" of the salsa festival of Vic-Fezensac (France), vice-president of the Centre de Musique populaire de Céret, consultant for the Latin Jazz exhibition organized by the Smithsonian Institution in Washington, D.C., and director of the music collection for the French publisher Buchet Chastel. She organized concerts for the Musée national des Arts d'Afrique et d'Océanie and the Centre Pompidou, produced radio programs for France Musique, France Culture and Radio Canada and hosted programs on Salsa TV. In Paris, she also studied for ten years with the French jazz pianist Bernard Maury. She has given lectures and workshops in several countries; taught Latin dancing in France and Belgium. She translated over forty books into French, among them the biographies of Ella Fitzgerald, Marvin Gaye, Otis Redding, Chet Baker and Johann Sebastian Bach.

== Publications ==
=== Articles in ===
Elle, Jeune Afrique, Magazine de l'ORTF, Ethnomusicology, Routes, Jazz Spotlite News, Nuestro, Canales, La Tribune de Genève, Arts et Vie, Jazz and Keyboard Workshop, Vogue, Africa, Latin American Music Review, Cahiers de Musiques Traditionnelles, Courrier de l'Unesco, Les Lettres Françaises, Le Monde d'Hermès, Percussions, L'autre Afrique, Le Monde de la musique, Jazz Magazine, Les Cahiers du Jazz, Le Courrier, New West Indian Guide, One More Time, and other publications. Isabelle Leymarie has written liner notes for several record labels.

=== Texts in collective books ===
- Hot Sauces: Latin and Caribbean Pop. New York: Quill. 1985. ISBN 068802193X.
- Le Nouveau dictionnaire du jazz. Paris: Robert Laffont. 1988. ISBN 2221115929.
- 1,000 Keyboard Ideas. New York: Alfred Music. 1990. ISBN 0943748488.
- The Commuter Nation. Puerto Rico: University of Puerto Rico Press. 1990. ISBN 0847724980.
- Histoires de bal. Paris: Cité de la Musique. 1990. ISBN 2906460699.
- Dictionnaire de la danse. Paris: Larousse. 1999. ISBN 2035833353.
- Perspectives on Contemporary Issues: Readings Across the Disciplines. Fort Worth: Harcourt. 1999. ISBN 0495912921.
- Les Danses latines. Paris: Autrement. 2001.
- Discover Jazz. Boston: Pearson. 2011. ISBN 978-0136026372.
- Cuba: This Moment, Exactly So. San Rafael: Insight Editions. 2015. ISBN 9781608876747.
- La Suisse est un village. Vevey: Les Éditions de l’Aire. 2016. ISBN 9782940586424.
- Le Monde est un village. Vevey: Les Éditions de l’Aire. 2016. ISBN 9782940586431.
- Naissances. Éditions de l’Aire. 2018. ISBN 9782940586912. (in French)
- Pour Michel Moret. Vevey: Les Amis de l’Aire. 2018.

== Bibliography ==
- La salsa et le Latin Jazz. Paris: PUF. 1993. ISBN 2130453171.
- Du tango au reggae: musiques noires d'Amérique latine et des Caraïbes. Paris: Flammarion. 1996. ISBN 2742708359.
- Musiques caraïbes. Paris: Actes Sud. 1996. ISBN 2352841623.
- La musique sud-américaine : Rythmes et danses d'un continent. Collection « Découvertes Gallimard » (nº 317). Paris: Éditions Gallimard. 1997. ISBN 978-2-07-053391-6.
- Cuban Fire – Musiques populaires d’expression cubaine. Paris: Outre Mesure. 1997. ISBN 2907891154.
- La música latinoamericana, ritmos y danzas de un continente. Collection «Biblioteca de bolsillo CLAVES» (nº 2). Barcelona: Ediciones B. 1997. ISBN 8440677057.
- Ritmi sudamericani: dal tango al samba-reggae. Collection «Universale Electa/Gallimard» (nº 101). Milan/Turin: Electa/Gallimard. 1997. ISBN 8844501252.
- Latin Jazz. Madrid: Vade Retro. 1998. ISBN 2909828654.
- Músicas del Caribe. Madrid: Akal. 1998. ISBN 8440677057.
- Cuba: La Musique des dieux. Paris: Éditions du Layeur. 1998. ISBN 2911468163.
- Les griots wolofs du Sénégal. Paris: Maisonneuve et Larose. 1999. ISBN 2706813571.
- Cuban Fire: The Story of Salsa and Latin Jazz. New York: Continuum. 2002. ISBN 0826455867.
- La Música cubana: Cuba. Barcelona: Océano. 2003. ISBN 8449424097. (awarded the fr:Prix des Muses Prix des Muses)
- Latin Jazz (2nd ed.). Paris: Buchet Chastel. 2003. ISBN 2283019834.
- Dizzy Gillespie (2nd ed.). Paris: Vade Retro, Buchet Chastel. 2003 [1998]. ISBN 2909828735.
- Jazz Latino. Barcelona: Robinbook. 2005. ISBN 8496222276.
- Del tango al reggae: Músicas negras de América Latina y del Caribe. Zaragoza: Prensas de la Universidad de Zaragoza. 2015. ISBN 978-8416272747.
- Jazz Piano: Yesterday and Today. Amazon Kindle Direct Publishing. 2015. ISBN 978-1515263685.
- Picasso And All That Jazz: A Memoir. Amazon Kindle Direct Publishing. 2016. ISBN 978-1530847921.
- Picasso, le Jazz et autres Instants de Vie. Amazon Kindle Direct Publishing. 2016. ISBN 978-1533590350.
- Du tango au reggae: musiques noires d'Amérique latine et des Caraïbes (revised and augmented ed.). Paris: Éditions du Jasmin. 2016. ISBN 9782352841623.
- Trésors de la Littérature Suisse. Éditions de l’Aire. 2016. ISBN 9782940537648.
- From The Tango To Reggae: Black and Creole Music of Latin America and the Caribbean. Amazon Kindle Direct Publishing. 2017. ISBN 978-1981413102.
- Piano Jazz, une histoire. Paris: Éditions du Jasmin. 2018. ISBN 978-2352841784.
- Barn Yarns. Bloomington: Amazon Kindle Direct Publishing. 2018. ISBN 978-1727839975.
- Piano Jazz. Barcelona: Ma Non Troppo, Redbook Ediciones. 2019. ISBN 9788412081244.
- Lafcadio Hearn: La passion de l'ailleurs. Éditions du Jasmin. 2020. ISBN 9782352842316.
- Antonio Carlos Jobim. Éditions du Jasmin. 2020. ISBN 9782352842330.
- Calembourdes et Calembedaines. The Book Edition. 2021. ISBN 9782957887408.
- Billevesées. The Book Edition. 2021. ISBN 9782957887415.
- Impressions. The Book Edition. 2021. ISBN 9782957887422.
- Le Jazz Brésilien. Éditions du Jasmin. 2021. ISBN 9782352840985.
- Piano Jazz – Une histoire (revised and augmented ed.). Éditions du Jasmin. 2022. ISBN 2352843987.
- Résonances – Entretiens avec des grands pianistes de jazz. Éditions du Jasmin. 2023. ISBN 9782352843955.
- La musique populaire et le jazz cubains. Éditions du Jasmin. 2024. ISBN 9782352842453.
- P(a)ris sur le vif. Amazon Kindle Direct Publishing. 2024. ISBN 9798338948705.
- Le français d’aujourd’hui : Décadence d’une langue. Éditions de Paris. 2025. ISBN 9782846213684.
- Robert Walser l’insaisissable. Le Canoë/Exils. 2026. ISBN 9782914823388.

== Translations ==
- Jim Haskins (1992). Ella Fitzgerald. Paris: Filipacchi. ISBN 2850183326.
- Louise Levathes (1995). Les Navigateurs de l'Empire céleste. Paris: Filipacchi. ISBN 2850183024.
- Bruce Porter (1995). Cocaïne - L'Incroyable filière. Paris: Filipacchi. ISBN 2841530205.
- Deborah Lake (1995). Cérémonies Secrètes - Journal intime d'une femme chez les mormons. Paris: Filipacchi. ISBN 2850182869.
- Donald E. Watson (1995). Ainsi sois toi. Paris: Ifrane. ISBN 2841530124.
- Mariët Westermann (1996). Le Siècle d'Or en Hollande. Paris: Flammarion. ISBN 2080122819.
- Michael Camille (1998). Le Monde gothique. Paris: Flammarion. ISBN 2080122827.
- Pierre Bergé et Madison Cox (1999). Majorelle - Une oasis marocaine. Arles: Actes Sud. ISBN 9782742724307.
- Derek Bailey (1999). L'improvisation - Sa nature et sa pratique dans la musique. Paris: Outre Mesure. ISBN 2907891170.
- Stephen Lawhead (2000). La Lance de fer. Paris: Buchet Chastel. ISBN 2283018250.
- Hans Conrad Fischer (2000). Jean-Sébastien Bach. Holzgerlingen: Hänssler. ISBN 3775137114.
- Deborah Wye (2001). "Le langage d'Antoni Tapiès" in: Tapiès ou la poétique de la matière. Paris: Editions Cercle d'Art. ISBN 2717721541.
- Chet Baker (2001). Comme si j'avais des ailes. Paris: 10/18. ISBN 2264029641.
- Philip de Bay et James Bolton (2001). Gardenmania. Paris: Actes Sud. ISBN 2742731261.
- Geoff Brown (2001). Otis Redding. Paris: 10/18. ISBN 2264035897.
- Reema Keswani (2004). Les Bijoux de Shinde. Paris: Assouline. ISBN 2843234514.
- Ben Edmonds (2004). What's Going on, Marvin Gaye?. Paris: 10/18. ISBN 2264036435.
- Peter Hayden (2005). Jardins de Russie. Paris: Actes Sud. ISBN 2742756272.
- Nicholas D. Satan (2009). Le Journal du Diable. Paris: Contre-Dires. ISBN 9782849330975.
- Lewis Porter; Michael Ullman; Edward Hazell (2009). Le Jazz - Des origines à nos jours. Paris: Outre Mesure. ISBN 9782907891448.
- Machado de Assis (2020). Iaiá Garcia. Paris: Éditions du Jasmin. ISBN 9782352842347.
- Lafcadio Hearn (2021). Lafcadio Hearn et les Etats-Unis. Paris: Éditions du Jasmin. ISBN 9782352842309.
- Azorín (2022). Les Confessions d'un petit philosophe. Paris: Éditions du Canoë. ISBN 9782490251698.
- Henry Louis Gates Jr. (2024). Gens de couleur. Paris: Éditions du Canoë. ISBN 9782490251971.

== Filmography ==
- "Machito: A Latin Jazz Legacy” (1987), 58 minutes, written and produced by Isabelle Leymarie, co-directed with Carlos Ortiz
  - 1989 Festival Latino, New York
  - First Prize Winner, 1988 San Juan Film Festival
  - 1987 American Film & Video Festival
  - Jury Prize Winner, 1986 San Antonio Film Festival
- "Latin Jazz à New York" (1991), 52 minutes
- "Paris Jazz" (2004), 52 minutes
